= Up to the Hour =

- Genre: Magazine
- Running time: 60 minutes (in two 30-minute parts)
- Country of origin: United Kingdom
- Language(s): English
- Home station: BBC Radio 4
- Hosted by: Laurie Macmillan, John Marsh, Peter Donaldson, Harriet Cass, Peter Jefferson, Moira Stuart and others
- Original release: 2 May 1977 – 30 June 1978
- Opening theme: Tambourin
- Ending theme: Tambourin

Up to the Hour was a programme on BBC Radio 4 that ran from May 1977 to June 1978. There were two editions every weekday morning, each 25 minutes long and finishing at 7 am and 8 am respectively (hence the title). Both parts were followed by the Today programme, which during this period was also broadcast in two parts. Rather than hire a separate presenter, the programme was presented by the duty announcer. The first presenter was Laurie Macmillan, the last John Marsh; other presenters included Peter Donaldson, Harriet Cass, Peter Jefferson and future television newsreader Moira Stuart.

The original theme tune was Tambourin by François Joseph Gossec, performed by James Galway.

== History ==
In 1977 the then-controller of Radio 4, Ian McIntyre, cut the length of a number of news and current affairs programmes, in the belief that this would improve their overall quality. In the case of the breakfast programme Today, the reduction from two hours to one was achieved by splitting the programme into two. The gaps created were filled by Up to the Hour, which consisted of lighter items such as music, sport and trailers for upcoming programmes. It also incorporated the existing religious slot, Thought for the Day.

The new format was unpopular with BBC staff, including Peter Donaldson who on at least one occasion openly ridiculed the programme on air. It also provoked comments in the diary columns of the daily newspapers. From July 1978 Today returned to its previous length and Up to the Hour was dropped.
