= Dancing in the Moonlight (disambiguation) =

"Dancing in the Moonlight" is a song written by Sherman Kelly, originally recorded in 1970, becoming a hit single by King Harvest in 1972.

Dancing in the Moonlight may also refer to:

- "Dancing in the Moonlight", a 1978 song by Aboriginal Australian band Coloured Stone
- "Dancing in the Moonlight", a composition recorded by the China Broadcasting Chinese Orchestra
- "Dancing in the Moonlight", a song by Men Without Hats from the 2003 album No Hats Beyond This Point
- "Dancing in the Moonlight", a song by Scooter from the 1997 album Age of Love
- "Dancing in the Moonlight", a song by Paul Zaza and Carl Zittrer from the 1980 film Prom Night
- "Dancing in the Moonlight (It's Caught Me in Its Spotlight)", a 1977 song by Thin Lizzy
- Dancing in the Moonlight – The Best of Toploader, a compilation album by Toploader

== See also ==
- Persona 3: Dancing in Moonlight, a rhythm video game
