= Jubël (duo) =

Swedish musical duo

- Origin: Halmstad, Sweden
- Genres: Pop, electropop
- Years active: 2017–present
- Label: Warner Music
- Members: Sebastian Atas; Victor Sjöström

Jubël is a Swedish production duo originating from Halmstad, Sweden and made up of Sebastian Atas and Victor Sjöström. They are signed to Warner Music. They had worked separately for many years. But a collaboration in "Illusion" resulted in some fame with it being chosen for the theme of a global advertisement for the retailer and fashion line H&M. They rose to global fame in 2020 with their remix of the song "Dancing in the Moonlight", originally recorded in 1970 by Kelly Sherman's band Boffalongo and made a huge hit by King Harvest in 1972 and then again by Toploader in 2000. Jubël's version was released 2018 and featuring vocals by Neimy initially charted in Sweden, Norway and Belgium. A re-release in 2020 gave it a bigger international boost with charting in the UK Singles Chart, where it peaked at number 11. It also charted on ARIA, the Australian Official Singles Chart also in 2020. The song was used in series 6 of the reality show Love Island in 2020 and spread to TikTok. and reached the top of the British radio list.

Meanwhile Jubël released its debut album Strawtown in 2019 and Strawtown EP in 2020 and follow up hits "On the Beach", a remix of a Chris Rea song charting in Finland and topping the Finnish Airplay chart for one week and "Someone" charting in Sverigetopplistan in Sweden in 2020. "Teenage Minds" and "Running Out of Love" have been radio hits. Jubël also performed at Stockholm's Lollapalooza.

== Discography ==
=== Albums ===
Title	Details	Peak positions		
Title	Details	SWE	FIN	NOR
Strawtown	Released: 2019; Label: Warner Music Sweden	16	40	25

=== Extended plays ===
Title	Details	Peak positions
Title	Details	SWE
Strawtown EP	Released: 27 March 2020; Label: Warner Music Sweden	—
6115 Orange St	Released: 4 June 2021; Label: Warner Music Sweden	—

=== Singles ===
Title	Year	Peak positions							Certifications	Album / EP
Title	Year	SWE	AUS	BEL (Fl)	BEL (Wa)	FIN	UK	TUR	Certifications	Album / EP
"Illusion"	2017	—	—	—	—	—	—	—		Non-album single
"Dancing in the Moonlight" (featuring Neimy)	2018	9	26	46 (Ultratip)	19 (Ultratip)	—	11	—	GLF: Platinum; BPI: Platinum; IFPI DEN: Platinum; IFPI NOR: Gold; MC: 2× Platinum	Strawtown (album)
"On the Beach"	2019	—	—	—	—	16	—	—	GLF: Gold	Strawtown EP
"Running Out of Love"	2019	—	—	—	—	—	—	—	GLF: Gold	Strawtown EP
"Someone"	2020	17	—	—	—	—	—	—	GLF: Platinum; IFPI NOR: Gold	Strawtown EP
"Weekend Vibe"	2021	—	—	—	—	—	—	—	GLF: Gold	6115 Orange St
"Dumb"	2021	—	—	—	—	—	—	—		6115 Orange St
"Puerto Rico"	2021	—	—	—	—	—	—	—		6115 Orange St
"Weekend Vibe" (featuring Desi Crew)	2021	—	—	—	—	—	—	—		6115 Orange St
"So Sick"	2022	— (Note: "So Sick" did not enter the Swedish Singellista Chart, but peaked at number one on the Swedish Heatseeker Chart.)	—	—	—	—	—	—		Non-album singles
"Diamonds" (featuring Aleyna Tilki)	2022	—	—	—	—	—	—	15		Non-album singles
"Lucky" (featuring Noa Kirel)	2022	—	—	—	—	—	—	—		Non-album singles
"My Only Wish" (featuring Christopher)	2022	—	—	—	—	—	—	—		Non-album singles
"Triple A" (featuring NLE Choppa)	2023	— (Note: "Triple A" did not enter the Swedish Singellista Chart, but peaked at number two on the Swedish Heatseeker Chart.)	—	—	—	—	—	—		Non-album singles
"Off My Mind" (featuring Omar Rudberg)	2023	—	—	—	—	—	—	—		Non-album singles
"Chocolate" (with NOTD)	2024	—	—	—	—	—	—	—		Non-album singles
"Ocean House"	2026	—	—	—	—	—	—	—		Non-album singles

*Did not appear in the official Belgian Ultratop 50 charts, but rather in the bubbling under Ultratip charts.
