= Dan Hipgrave =

English musician and writer (born 1975)

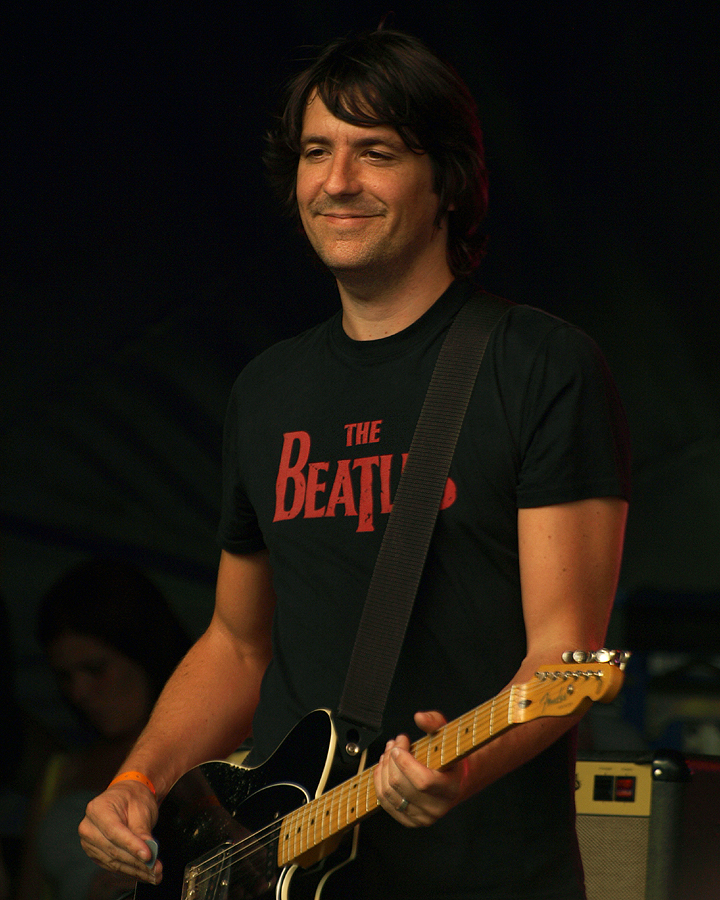
- Hipgrave at the Godiva Festival 2009

Background information
- Born: Daniel Hipgrave; 5 August 1975 (age 51); Brighton, England
- Genres: Post-Britpop; Alternative rock; Indie rock; Pop rock
- Occupation: Musician
- Instruments: Guitar; keyboard
- Years active: 1997–present
- Labels: S2; Epic; Underdogs Music; Big Lake Music; India Media Group
- Member of: Toploader

Daniel Hipgrave (born 5 August 1975) is an English musician and writer, best known as the guitarist of the post-Britpop/alternative rock band Toploader.

== Early life ==
Hipgrave studied psychiatric nursing at the University of Sussex, until he left in 1996 to devote his time to his band.

== Music career ==
In April 1998, Toploader signed a six-album deal with S2 Records, a subsidiary of Sony Records. They went on to tour worldwide in their own right, and as a supporting act to Paul Weller, Robbie Williams and Bon Jovi. Toploader's debut album, Onka's Big Moka, was released in 1999, it sold more than one million copies. The album featured various chart hits including their cover of "Dancing in the Moonlight", "Achilles Heel" and "Only for a While". Toploader's second album, Magic Hotel, was released in 2002. But despite it entering the UK Albums Chart at number 3, the band were dropped by their label. Toploader split in 2003 stating the reason as 'personal differences', the band remained silent for six years, until reforming in 2009.

== Other work ==
Hipgrave has turned his attention towards writing and television work, making a number of appearances in both media. In 2008 Hipgrave appeared as the resident travel expert on BBC2's Market Kitchen as well as reporting live from Radio 1's Big Weekend in Maidstone for BBC One.

He has written articles for The Guardian, The Daily Telegraph, The Independent, The Mail on Sunday and other publishing outlets.

== Personal life ==
Hipgrave married TV presenter Gail Porter in 2001; they have one daughter, Honey. By 2004, they had separated; they later divorced.

In August 2007, Hipgrave announced his engagement to television and radio presenter Lynsey Horn; they married on 8 November 2008 at Langley Castle, Northumberland. They have one child.
