= Ronald Fletcher =

English radio announcer and newsreader

- Born: Ronald Stephen Fletcher; 10 July 1910; Salisbury, Wiltshire, England
- Died: 6 February 1996 (aged 85); Roehampton, London, England
- Occupations: Radio announcer; Newsreader
- Employer: BBC
- Spouses: Terri Hann (m. 1938; div. 1958) Rita Dando (m. 1959; death 1996)
- Children: 4

Ronald Stephen Fletcher (10 July 1910 – 6 February 1996) was an English radio announcer and newsreader for the BBC. He began his career as a crooner on South African radio in the early 1930s before returning to the United Kingdom and got involved in the production of unsuccessful programmes for early commercial radio stations. Fletcher joined the BBC after demobilisation in 1945, working on the BBC Light Programme, the BBC Home Service and the BBC Third Programme. He was the announcer for actor Bernard Braden's radio series Breakfast with Braden and Bedtime with Braden and did television programmes such as Twice a Fortnight, the BBC consumer programme Braden's Week and On the Braden Beat on ITV. Fletcher did 200 episodes of the BBC Radio 4 panel game show Quote... Unquote from 1975 to 1994.

== Early life ==
Fletcher was born on 10 July 1910 in Salisbury. He was the son of a chartered accountant, and his grandfather had wealth from his job as a coal mine owner in the North of England. Fletcher had a younger sister. He was first educated at Shrewsbury School, and then enrolled at Trinity Hall, Cambridge, where he read English but was expelled for spending a large amount of time at the bookmakers or playing golf rather than studying. Fletcher lost his inheritance he received from his grandfather by betting on horse races and investing in a string of failed business ventures during the 1930s.

== Career ==
After university, he took the rest of his inheritance and emigrated to South Africa in the early 1930s. Fletcher became a crooner and made his debut on the radio. He returned to Britain in the late 1930s and got involved in the production of unsuccessful programmes for early commercial radio stations. Fletcher served as a lieutenant in an anti-aircraft regiment of the Royal Artillery during the Second World War. After he was demobilised, he worked a number of jobs until he was suggested to apply for the job of a BBC radio announcer. In 1945, Fletcher joined the corporation after he observed an advertisement for such an radio announcer. He first worked on the BBC Light Programme as a newsreader and also introduced programmes. Fletcher also did news reading on the BBC Home Service and the BBC Third Programme.

In 1950, the Canadian actor Bernard Braden had launched the radio series Breakfast with Braden and Bedtime with Braden to which Fletcher was invited to be an announcer for the ending of both programmes, taking a comedy role in the latter programme. Afterwards, he received invites to read for a number of light entertainment programmes, such as The Navy Lark, and Bath-Time With Braden in which he played the part of a barrister. Fletcher survived an attempt to remove him from the show after Braden had an interview with Ian Jacob, the Director-General of the BBC. He remained in radio until he was 58, when he left the BBC staff in the late 1960s and joined Braden as an announcer, on television programmes such as the short-lived series Twice a Fortnight, the BBC consumer programme Braden's Week and On the Braden Beat on ITV. In 1971, Fletcher was summoned by actor John Cleese to receive the Monty Python Award for best dressed newsreader.

Esther Rantzen, who was a researcher on Braden's Week, reportedly wanted Fletcher to read the newspaper clippings on her consumer programme That's Life! but an administrative error by a BBC booking clerk meant that Cyril Fletcher got the part instead. In 1975, John Lloyd and Nigel Rees sought a broadcaster to read the quotations on the BBC Radio 4 panel game show Quote... Unquote and selected Fletcher for the job. Fletcher sometimes provided Rees with suggestions of reading a quote in a certain manner but Rees dissuaded him from doing it. He retired from the programme in 1994 because of ill health, having recorded 200 editions.

== Personal life ==
Fletcher was married twice. His first marriage was to Terri Hann from 1938 to 1958. They had two children. On 29 May 1959, he married for the second time to the BBC Overseas Service studio manager Rita Dando. There were two children of the second marriage. Fletcher had an heart attack en route to a betting shop and died at hospital in Roehampton on 6 February 1996. His funeral was at the Mortlake Crematorium on 13 February.
