= Quote... Unquote =

British radio panel game show (1976–2021)

Quote ... Unquote
- Genre: Panel game
- Running time: 30 minutes
- Country of origin: United Kingdom
- Language: English
- Home station: BBC Radio 4
- Syndicates: BBC Radio 4 Extra
- Hosted by: Nigel Rees
- Announcer: (Readers); Ronald Fletcher; Patricia Hughes; Charlotte Green
- Created by: Nigel Rees
- Recording studio: BBC Radio Theatre and remotely
- Original release: 4 January 1976
- No. of series: 57 as of November 2021
- No. of episodes: 506 as of November 2021
- Audio format: Stereo
- Opening theme: "Duddly Dell", written and performed by Dudley Moore
- Website: Official website

Quote ... Unquote is a panel game, based on quotations, which was broadcast on BBC Radio 4. It was chaired by its deviser, Nigel Rees, and ran from 4 January 1976 to December 2021. The programme is available online via the BBC Sounds application.

== Format ==
The main part of the programme consisted of a non-competitive quiz where the chairman asked each of three panellists (originally four) in turn to identify where a certain quotation, phrase or saying comes from. In between these rounds, the panellists were asked to share some of their favourite quotations on a specified theme. Other parts of the programme were devoted to answering queries from listeners about the sources of quotations and the origins of everyday phrases and idioms.

== Panellists ==
There have been over 500 guests on the programme, many appearing several times. They include Tom Stoppard, Peter Cook, Peter Ustinov, Ned Sherrin, Judi Dench, Alan Bennett, Denis Healey, David Attenborough, Kingsley Amis, Kenneth Williams, Douglas Adams, John Mortimer, Neil Kinnock, Celia Haddon, Katharine Whitehorn, Julian Mitchell, Malcolm Muggeridge and George Brown.

== Production ==
Actors or former BBC staff announcers were engaged to read the quotations on the programme. Ronald Fletcher was the original reader. In later years the main male reader was Peter Jefferson, formerly of BBC Radio 4, who took over from William Franklyn when that actor died in 2006. Another former Radio 4 announcer, Charlotte Green, assumed the role from the beginning of Series 50 in August 2014. Patricia Hughes, formerly in the same role on BBC Radio 3, was another regular from 1994.

Several significant comedy producers supervised the programme early in their careers, including John Lloyd (deviser of QI), TV executive Geoffrey Perkins, Have I Got News for You producer Harry Thompson, and Armando Iannucci.

The programme's theme tune, between which snatches of quotations were inserted at the beginning of each show, was "Duddly Dell", written and performed by Dudley Moore; it had been the B-side of the single "Strictly for the Birds" (1961).

Following the 500th edition, broadcast in December 2021, Nigel Rees announced that he was ending the programme after 46 years, partly because the COVID-19 pandemic had made it impossible to record in the traditional way with a studio audience, and also because of what he described as "cultural issues at the BBC", saying "I can no longer do the programme [in the way that] I have enjoyed doing it". He implied that the BBC's enthusiasm for "woke" attitudes had caused difficulty. Rees has said the associated newsletter would continue.
