= Patricia Hughes (radio presenter) =

British radio announcer and news presenter

Patricia Rosemary Hughes (26 January 1923 – 8 February 2013) was a British radio continuity announcer and news presenter, most associated with BBC Radio 3. Known for her "meticulous delivery" and, according to former Radio 3 controller Stephen Hearst, "Kensington voice" (which was not intended as a compliment), Hughes broadcast for the Corporation on several of its networks over the decades.

== Biography ==
Born in Malaya, where her father was a senior executive, Hughes was educated at a school in Sussex. After returning to Kuala Lumpur, following the completion of her schooling, she was evacuated to Singapore with her mother when the Japanese invaded at Christmas 1941. After a brief period in South Africa, she returned to London.

She joined the BBC's secretarial typing pool in 1944 during the later stages of World War II, Hughes began her broadcasting career on the BBC Overseas Service. She then appeared on the BBC Light Programme, BBC Home Service and BBC Third Programme. Hughes was one of the first women to read the news on BBC radio, four years before Sheila Tracy became the first female news reader on BBC Radio 4.

After a career break during which she raised her daughter, Hughes returned to the newly launched BBC Radio 3 in 1969, when she began presenting the Monday Lunchtime Concerts from St John's, Smith Square in Westminster, London. Under the insistence of Radio 3 controller Ian McIntyre, who objected to her "cut-glass tones", she was forced to retire from the BBC staff in 1983, on reaching the then statutory retirement age of 60. A controversial decision at the time, the author and television presenter Bamber Gascoigne described McIntyre as a "barbarian" for his action. Hughes was awarded with a special commendation at the inaugural Sony Radio Academy Awards in the same year.

In broadcast retirement, Hughes continued to use her vocal skills, recording audiobooks including an autobiography of Margaret Thatcher, and as the reader on the Radio 4 panel game Quote... Unquote from 1994 to 2001 when Hughes chose to retire again.

Having lived during her career in Twickenham, Hughes died at a nursing home in Winchester, Hampshire on 8 February 2013, aged 90.
