= Dancing in the Moonlight – The Best of Toploader =

2009 compilation album by Toploader

Greatest hits album by Toploader
- Released: 9 March 2009
- Recorded: 1998–2002
- Genre: Post-Britpop; alternative rock
- Length: 56:58
- Label: Sony CMG
- Producer: Dave Eringa

Toploader chronology
Magic Hotel (2002)	Dancing in the Moonlight – The Best of Toploader (2009)	Only Human (2011)

Dancing in the Moonlight – The Best of Toploader is a compilation album by English band Toploader. It was released on 9 March 2009.

== Background ==
It was compiled and released by Sony Music without the band's consent or input. The album was a budget release on Sony's CMG label and was therefore ineligible to chart on the UK Albums Chart. The album collects the band's seven singles alongside album tracks from their debut album Onka's Big Moka and second studio set Magic Hotel. The album also features tracks that were not present on previous Toploader albums, including "Have & To Hold" and "Hero Underground", both of which were b-sides to "Time of My Life" and an acoustic version of "Dancing in the Moonlight". Which was previously on an exclusive 4 track Unplugged CD, only sold with The Sun newspaper.

== Track listing ==
1. "Dancing in the Moonlight" (from Onka's Big Moka) – 3:53
2. "Time of My Life" (from Magic Hotel) – 3:34
3. "Let the People Know" (from Onka's Big Moka) – 3:54
4. "Achilles Heel" (from Onka's Big Moka) – 4:18
5. "Only for a While" (from Onka's Big Moka) – 4:14
6. "Breathe" (from Onka's Big Moka) – 3:56
7. "Have & to Hold" – 3:53
8. "Hero Underground" – 3:03
9. "Lady Let Me Shine" (from Magic Hotel) – 5:02
10. "High Flying Bird" (from Onka's Big Moka) – 4:10
11. "Just Hold On" (from Onka's Big Moka) – 4:00
12. "Higher State" (from Onka's Big Moka) – 3:11
13. "Cloud 9" (from Magic Hotel) – 3:34
14. "Some Kind of Wonderful" (from Magic Hotel) – 3:16
15. "Dancing in the Moonlight" (Acoustic Version) – 3:00
