= Mark Forrest (radio presenter) =

British radio presenter

Mark Forrest is a British radio presenter, former radio newsreader and former radio continuity announcer.

== Education ==
Forrest grew up in Beverley, East Riding of Yorkshire and in Wetherby, West Yorkshire. He attended school in Leeds, and then studied mathematics at the University of Newcastle upon Tyne.

== Career ==
Forrest began his radio career at Radio Tees. He then presented a show on Metro Radio in Newcastle upon Tyne between 2am and 6am, while he was an undergraduate student at the university there.

After leaving Metro Radio, Forrest worked at Virgin Radio and in 1995, he was presenting a show between 10pm and 2am on weekdays on Virgin Radio in the UK. In 1998, Forrest was presenting a show between 4pm and 7pm on weekdays and a show between 9am and 12am on Saturdays on Virgin Radio in the UK.

In 1999, Forrest was presenting Virgin Radio's twice-weekly movie review show, the Movie Chart Show, alongside Gail Porter. The show was broadcast on Channel 5.

After having worked at Virgin Radio and Heart Radio, Forrest joined Classic FM to present a Saturday morning show with co-presenters Anne Marie-Minhall and Tim Lihoreau. Forrest was presenting the station's weekday drivetime show, a Friday evening musician interview and arts news programme on the station, and the station's Saturday breakfast show, in 2006. Forrest finished presenting the drivetime show on the station in 2010. Forrest also presented the weekday breakfast show on the station from 2010 until 2012, when Tim Lihoreau took over presenting the show. Forrest's affection for classical music originated from his father, who had a large collection of classical music albums.

Forrest presented the breakfast show on BBC Radio York in 2012. He then moved to presenting an evening show between 7pm and 10pm across England and the Channel Islands on BBC Local Radio. All BBC Local Radio stations broadcast the show, unless they were airing local sports coverage or local breaking news coverage. The show, produced by Wire Free Productions, collated the best of BBC Local Radio broadcasting from the day and also included detailed weather information, contributions from listeners and other content. Initially, not all reactions from critics to show were positive. In 2015, Georgey Spanswick took over the Friday edition of the programme and in 2017, Forrest left the programme altogether and Spanswick began presenting the show on all weekdays.

He presented a Sunday morning show between 9am and midday on BBC Radio York, starting in September 2012 and finishing in May 2013. The show focused on topics relating to the outdoors.

Forrest joined BBC Radio 3 as a network presenter in 2017, and later became a newsreader. In February 2018, he joined BBC Radio 4 as a newsreader, news presenter and continuity announcer. He presented the Six O'Clock News, Midnight News and Shipping Forecast on the station, in addition to presenting shorter news bulletins and providing continuity between programmes. Between 2021 and 2022, Forrest also presented News Briefing and read the news on the Today Programme. In January 2025, Forrest left BBC Radio 4.

In January 2019, Forrest was announced as one of the presenters on the then upcoming radio station Scala Radio (which is now known as Magic Classical). Forrest began presenting the weekday drivetime show on the station from the point of the station's launch in March 2019, at which point he stopped working on Radio 3. He presented the show from his home studio, located at his farm in the Yorkshire Dale, working on the farm for some of the rest of the day. The station broadcast on DAB from the point of launch. Forrest moved to a Monday-Thursday evening slot from a weekday morning slot in 2023. In 2024, he left Scala Radio when the station stopped broadcasting presenter-led programming after 1pm on weekdays.

In 2024, he returned to BBC Radio 3, this time to present programmes. He is one of the presenters of Radio 3 in Concert and of BBC Radio 3's Breakfast.

Forrest has also covered weekend programmes on Smooth Radio in the UK. He has sat in for Stephen Nolan on BBC Radio 5 Live.

== Personal life ==
In addition to his work in the media, Forrest is a sheep farmer. In 2025, he was interviewed about his intense love for places in Yorkshire, where he lives, in an interview with the Yorkshire Post.
