= Hipgrave =

Hipgrave is a surname. Notable people with the surname include:

- Dan Hipgrave (born 1975), English musician and writer
- Keegan Hipgrave (born 1997), Australian rugby league footballer
- Lynsey Hipgrave (born 1979), English television and radio presenter and journalist
