= BBC Radio Scotland =

Scottish national radio station

Coordinates: 55.8580°N 4.2909°W

- Logo used since 2022
- Glasgow; Scotland
- Broadcast area: Scotland (Note: Scotland only on FM, MW, DAB and Freeview, available via BBC Sounds and satellite/cable television for rest of the UK)
- Frequencies: FM: 92.5–94.7 MHz; AM: 810 kHz; DAB: 11B, 11C and 12D; Freeview: 711 (Scotland only); Freesat: 712; Sky: 0114 (UK only); Virgin Media: 930
- RDS: BBC Scot

Programming
- Language: English
- Format: News, music, sport, talk

Ownership
- Owner: BBC
- Operator: BBC Scotland
- Sister stations: BBC Radio nan Gàidheal; BBC Radio Orkney; BBC Radio Shetland

History
- First air date: 23 November 1978; 47 years ago
- Former frequencies: 585 MW

Technical information
- Licensing authority: Ofcom

Links
- Webcast: BBC Sounds
- Website: bbc.co.uk/radioscotland

BBC Radio Scotland is a Scottish national radio network owned and operated by BBC Scotland, a division of the BBC. It broadcasts a wide variety of programmes. It replaced the Scottish BBC Radio 4 opt-out service of the same name from 23 November 1978. The station is primarily broadcast from the BBC Scotland studios at Pacific Quay in Glasgow. But some programming comes from other BBC Scotland bases like in Aberdeen and Edinburgh.

Radio Scotland is broadcast in English, whilst sister station Radio nan Gàidheal broadcasts in Scottish Gaelic.

According to RAJAR, the station broadcasts to a weekly audience of 793,000 and has a listening share of 5.7% as of October 2025.

Since August 2025, the station has been led by Victoria Easton-Riley, a former Bauer executive.

== History ==
The first BBC Radio Scotland broadcast was on 17 December 1973, a fortnight earlier than planned.

BBC Radio Scotland was founded as a full-time radio network on 23 November 1978. Previously it was possible only to opt out of BBC Radio 4, and the service was known as Radio 4 Scotland or, formally on air, as "BBC Scotland Radio 4". Although on some occasions Radio Scotland used to use BBC Radio 2 as a sustaining service at certain times, most notably during the Sport on 2 Saturday afternoon programme with a BBC Scotland opt-out on 202m known as "BBC Scotland Radio 2"; however, this has been discontinued since.

The establishment of a separate network was made possible when Radio 4 became a fully UK-wide network when it moved from medium wave to long wave and new VHF (FM) transmitters were brought into service, so that Radio 4 and Radio Scotland no longer had to share on FM. However, it was not until the early 1990s that Radio 4 was available on FM across all of Scotland; so for its first decade on air, the station only broadcast during the day so that Radio 4 could be heard on Radio Scotland's transmitters in the evening to compensate for poorer AM reception after dark.

Kirsty Wark launched her career on BBC Radio Scotland, first as a researcher and then as a producer.

== Programmes ==
Radio Scotland broadcasts a wide range of programming, including news, debate, music, drama, comedy and sports. It is broadcast from the BBC Scotland headquarters in the Pacific Quay in Glasgow. The station simulcasts BBC Radio 5 Live during its overnight downtime.

== Local opt-outs ==
BBC Radio Orkney and BBC Radio Shetland opt out of BBC Radio Scotland for 30 minutes each weekday to broadcast a local news programme and during the winter months this is supplemented in both areas by an additional hour-long programme. Local news and weather bulletins are also broadcast as opt-outs from news studios in Selkirk, Dumfries, Aberdeen and Inverness on weekdays.

== Notable presenters ==
- Bryan Burnett (music)
- Stuart Cosgrove (sport)
- Tam Cowan (sport)
- Vic Galloway (music)
- Amy Irons (music, news and entertainment)
- Martin Geissler (news)
- Gary Innes (music)
- Stephen Jardine (news)
- Ricky Ross (music)
- Ashley Storrie (music and chat show)
- Grant Stott (music)

=== Past presenters ===
- Kaye Adams (news)
- Richard Gordon (sport)
- Michelle McManus (music and entertainment)
- Mary Ann Kennedy (lifestyle, features and documentaries)
- Fred MacAulay (lifestyle, features and documentaries)
- Cathy MacDonald (music)
- Laura McGhie (news, lifestyle, features and music)
- Dougie Anderson
- Natasha Raskin Sharp (music)
- Shereen Nanjiani (news)
- John Beattie
- Colin Bell
- Ken Bruce
- Jackie Brambles
- Andy Cameron
- Ross Finlay
- Archie Fisher (music)
- Jim Gellatly (music)
- Armando Iannucci
- Jimmie Macgregor
- Anne MacKenzie
- Jimmy Mack
- Eddie Mair
- Bruce MacGregor (music)
- Sally Magnusson (lifestyle, features and documentaries)
- Sheena McDonald
- Brian Morton
- Tom Morton (music)
- Charles Nove
- Iain Purdon
- Robbie Shepherd (music)
- Ken Sykora
- Jim Traynor
- Kirsty Young
