= Chris Aldridge =

British radio newsreader and announcer

Chris Aldridge is a continuity announcer and newsreader for BBC Radio 4.

== Biography ==
He grew up in Horsham, West Sussex.

After one term studying medicine at London Hospital Medical College, Aldridge studied mathematics at Bedford College (University of London). He joined the BBC in 1985, working in the production and archiving departments of Radio 3. He became a newsreader at Radio 5, then a Radio 4 staff announcer in 1995. He spent 2002 training new staff; then returned to the station as a senior announcer alongside Harriet Cass, taking over from Peter Donaldson. He sometimes reads and presents the Six O'Clock News on BBC Radio 4.

In 2021, Aldridge stepped down from his role as senior announcer but remains on Radio 4 as a freelance announcer and newsreader.

On 8 September 2022, Aldridge announced the death of Queen Elizabeth II on BBC Radio.

He is married with two children; his hobbies include jogging, photography and playing the piano.
