= Ectoplasm =

Ectoplasm may refer to:

- Ectoplasm (paranormal), physically sensible phenomenon claimed to be due to "energy" described as paranormal
- Ectoplasm (cell biology), the outer part of the cytoplasm of protists
- Ectoplasm (radio show), BBC Radio 4 comedy series
- Ectoplasm (My Hero Academia), a character in the manga series My Hero Academia
