= Carolyn Brown (newsreader) =

British radio newsreader and continuity announcer

Carolyn Brown is a former BBC Radio 4 newsreader and continuity announcer.

Brown started her career as a reporter at a local newspaper, The Crewe Chronicle, and joined Radio City, an independent local radio station in Liverpool, England, in 1981. After two years, she moved to BBC Radio Leeds where she presented the morning news programme, Good Morning, Yorkshire.

After spells in regional television in Plymouth and Bristol, she joined BBC Radio 4 in 1991 as a continuity announcer and later read the Shipping Forecast. In December 2001 she began reading the news and one of her first items was the death of the Queen Mother.

In December 2012, 18 months after getting married, she stated that she would to donate a kidney to her husband, who required a life-saving operation. In April 2013, she spoke to Radio 4's Woman's Hour programme about her relationship with her husband after undergoing the operation.
