= Dancing in the Moonlight (album) =

- Digital cover artwork

Studio album by King Harvest
- Released: January 1973
- Genre: Pop
- Length: 34:57
- Label: Perception Records
- Producer: Jack Robinson

King Harvest chronology
I Can Tell (1971)	Dancing in the Moonlight (1973)	King Harvest (1975)

Singles from Dancing in the Moonlight
- 1. "Roosevelt and Ira Lee" Released: 1971; 2. "You and I" Released: 1971; 3. "Dancing in the Moonlight" Released: 1972

Professional ratings
Review scores
Source	Rating
AllMusic	4/5 stars

Dancing in the Moonlight is the second overall studio album and first worldwide album by the French-American rock band King Harvest, released in January 1973 by Perception Records. The album peaked at number 136 on the Billboard 200. The album contains the one-hit wonder title track. The album was reissued in November 1993 by Collectables Records.

== Background and release ==
Saxophonist and vocalist Rod Novak said of the album "We recorded 'Dancing in the Moonlight' in Paris in the fall of 1971 and after it flopped in Europe, we disappeared to lick our wounds. In the short couple months we were incommunicado, DITM started up the charts in the U.S. and our illustrious record company in France (Musidisc) gave the tapes that they had to the little American company (Perception Records) that leased DITM and Voila!, our first American album." Novak noted the band quickly put together "the album which should have been", but Perception "went bankrupt before we could release it." Shortly after the album was released, Perception went bankrupt.

== Track listing ==
Side one

1. "Lady, Come On Home" – 2:40
2. "Motor Job" – 2:47
3. "Roosevelt and Ira Lee" – 5:32
4. "Dancing in the Moonlight" – 2:40
5. "She Keeps Me High" – 4:00

Side two

1. "Think I Better Wait Till Tomorrow" – 3:00
2. "The Smile On Her Face" – 2:55
3. "You and I" – 2:38
4. "Marty and the Captain" – 2:17
5. "I Can Tell" – 4:45

== Charts ==
Chart (1973)	Peak position
US Billboard Top LPs & Tape	136
US Soul LPs (Billboard)	50
