= Gail Porter =

Scottish television personality, former model and actress

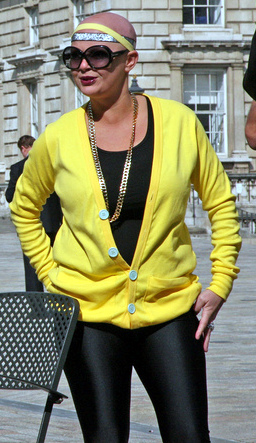
- Porter in 2009
- Born: 23 March 1971 (age 55); Edinburgh, Scotland
- Occupations: Television personality; model; actress
- Television: Fully Booked; The Big Breakfast; The Movie Chart Show; The Gadget Show; Celebrity Big Brother; Dead Famous
- Spouse: Dan Hipgrave (m. 2001; div. 2006)
- Children: 1

Gail Porter (born 23 March 1971) is a Scottish television personality, former model and actress. She started her television career in children's TV, before branching out into modelling and presenting mainstream TV. In 1999, she posed nude for FHM, an image which was projected on to the Houses of Parliament. Later in her career, Porter has been affected by alopecia, a condition which causes hair loss.

== Life and career ==
Porter grew up in Joppa, Edinburgh and attended Portobello High School. She studied media production at West Herts College. After making an unsuccessful bid to join the presentation team of the BBC children's show Blue Peter, she had a minor role in one episode of the BBC medical drama series Cardiac Arrest before going on to present family-friendly and children's programmes. They include Children's BBC Scotland, T.I.G.S, Around Scotland, MegaMag, Up For It!, Sticky, Disney's Great Cartoon Chase, How 2, Scratchy & Co, It's a Mystery, Children in Need, Fully Booked, The Movie Chart Show, Top of the Pops, Live & Kicking, and programmes such as The Big Breakfast and Gail Porter's Big 90s for VH1.

In the late 1990s she began to pose for magazines such as FHM. A nude photograph of Porter was projected on the Houses of Parliament in 1999 as part of a guerrilla marketing campaign, and accompanied it with a message to vote for her in the FHM Sexiest Women Poll. In her autobiography, Porter says she did not know about the stunt until it was reported the following day. In an interview with the BBC in 2020, she said that the incident left her so distraught that she was unable to get out of bed for a long time.

In 2001, Porter took part in the reality television show Celebrity Blind Man's Bluff and on Lily Savage's Blankety Blank. In 2003, she was on Channel 4's The Games, although injury curtailed her participation.

In 2004 to 2006 she presented three series of Dead Famous and in 2009 presented episodes of The Gadget Show, temporarily replacing Suzi Perry. In 2008 to 2011, Porter was a regular panelist on Channel 5's The Wright Stuff.

In 2010, she was a guest team captain on What Do Kids Know? with Rufus Hound, Joe Swash and Sara Cox on Watch. In August 2010, she began the Two Way Street campaign for solicitors Russell Jones & Walker, an initiative to develop the relationship between HGV drivers and cyclists, keeping them safer. In October 2010, Porter hosted a documentary on Current TV, Gail Porter on Prostitution which investigated sex work laws.

In 2014, Porter was a guest editor of Fashion Plus magazine. She appeared at London Fashion Week in September 2014 and wrote of her experiences for the magazine.

On 27 August 2015 she entered the Celebrity Big Brother house. On 15 September, she was the fourth housemate to be evicted after spending 20 days in the house.

In 2017 she became the brand ambassador for the insolvency practitioner Creditfix, meeting with the public and speaking openly about her struggles with debt in several corporate videos.

In 2018, she joined 26 other celebrities at Metropolis Studios and performed an original Christmas song called Rock With Rudolph, a song written and produced by Grahame and Jack Corbyn. The song was recorded in aid of Great Ormond Street Hospital and was released digitally through independent record label Saga Entertainment on 30 November 2018 under the artist name The Celebs. The music video debuted exclusively with The Sun on 29 November 2018 and had its first TV showing on Good Morning Britain on 30 November 2018. The song peaked at number two on the iTunes pop chart.

In 2020, Porter narrated the BBC Scotland series Inside The Zoo.

At the start of 2022, Porter was a presenter of Spooked Scotland (called Haunted Scotland for the American audience) alongside Chris Fleming.

== Alopecia ==
In 2005 Porter developed alopecia totalis, losing her hair. She decided not to wear a hat or wig in order to raise awareness of the condition. She became ambassador for the Little Princess Trust, a charity which provides wigs to children with hair loss. On Richard & Judy on 15 February 2006 she showed her hair, eyebrows and eyelashes were beginning to grow back. On 12 April 2006 she said "It is possible that I'm going to get my hair back." By May 2010 hair had grown on three-quarters of her scalp. By the end of the year, her hair had started falling out again.

Porter's condition was the subject of the BBC ONE Life series documentary Gail Porter Laid Bare on 31 May 2006. Her autobiography, Laid Bare: My Story of Love, Fame and Survival, was published in September 2007.

== Other activities ==
Gail Porter takes part in a number of charitable causes. She is a vice-president of The Children's Trust, a UK charity for children with brain injuries, and is an ambassador for Together Co, a loneliness charity in Brighton and Hove.

Porter tried stand-up comedy and appeared at the Comedy Store on 23 November 2009 in the Laughing Point event to help the youth homelessness charity, Centrepoint. Her autobiographical standup show Hung Drawn and Portered at the Edinburgh Fringe Festival mixed laughter and her personal hardships.

== Personal life ==
Porter married Toploader guitarist Dan Hipgrave in August 2001 and gave birth to their daughter Honey on 3 September 2002. She said in February 2005 that they had separated eight months earlier. Before they met, Porter was in a relationship with Keith Flint, the vocalist from The Prodigy.

Porter has been diagnosed with bipolar disorder and borderline personality disorder.

She is a black belt in karate.

On 8 September 2011, Porter told BBC Radio 5 Live's presenter Phil Williams that she had been detained under the Mental Health Act of 2007 for 17 days of treatment against her will. She stated that the signature on the documents to have her involuntarily committed to psychiatric treatment was that of her then-boyfriend, after texting him to say she felt suicidal. She said she had been "very frail, so who knows". She said she felt no benefit from the stay. She praised the staff but said the resources and the facilities were under-funded.
