= Dead Famous (TV series) =

- The series stars Chris Fleming and Gail Porter.
- Also known as: Dead Famous: Ghostly Encounters
- Created by: Bibi Lynch
- Starring: Chris Fleming; Gail Porter
- Country of origin: United Kingdom
- Original language: English
- No. of series: 3
- No. of episodes: 31

Production
- Producer: Twofour Broadcast
- Running time: 45 minutes

Original release
- Network: LivingTV
- Release: 15 June 2004 – 13 June 2006

Dead Famous: Ghostly Encounters is a British paranormal reality television series that originally aired on LivingTV from June 15, 2004, to June 13, 2006. The program searches for the alleged ghosts of famous deceased people. Curious skeptic Gail Porter and clairvoyant Chris Fleming take a road trip through America looking for the haunted locations where legends of stage, screen, and music reside. Described by the channel as "like a sharper, sexier, and funnier Mulder and Scully", the duo visits places where celebrity spirits are claimed to roam: their hotel rooms, diners, gardens, film lots, and theaters.

The show was produced by Twofour originally for broadcast on LivingTV, but because of its popularity, it can be seen in many countries and is currently aired on the Biography Channel.

Both series 1 and 2 are available on DVD, there is no news on when series 3 will be released.

== Episode format ==
Each week, skeptic Gail Porter and clairvoyant Chris Fleming look into events of paranormal proportions about legends like Frank Sinatra, Bing Crosby, Nat King Cole, James Dean, Lucille Ball, Jim Morrison, Marilyn Monroe, and John Wayne. Part travelogue, the show explores the intimate haunts where the famous dead are said to remain.

In each episode, the show visits three locations that have some link or connection to the dead celebrity, although some seem nebulous at best. All of the locations are researched for their historical connection and presented in a factual way.

== Episode list ==
=== Season One ===
#	Original Airdate	Location
101	15 June 2004	Al Capone and the Mob
102	22 June 2004	Frank Sinatra
103	29 June 2004	Marilyn Monroe
104	6 July 2004	James Dean
105	13 July 2004	Jim Morrison
106	20 July 2004	Lucille Ball
107	27 July 2004	Return to Thunderbird Lodge
108	3 August 2004	Return to Alcatraz

=== Season Two ===
#	Original Airdate	Location
201	11 January 2005	Alfred Hitchcock
202	18 January 2005	Houdini
203	25 January 2005	John Wayne
204	1 February 2005	Joan Crawford
205	8 February 2005	John Lennon
206	15 February 2005	Bette Davis
207	22 February 2005	Buddy Holly
208	1 March 2005	Bonnie and Clyde
209	8 March 2005	Jayne Mansfield
210	15 March 2005	Elvis Presley

=== Season Three ===
#	Original Airdate	Location
301	31 January 2006	Mae West
302	18 April 2006	Nat King Cole
303	25 April 2006	Billy the Kid
304	4 April 2006	Bing Crosby
305	10 January 2006	Carole Lombard and Clark Gable
306	16 May 2006	Andy Warhol
307	28 February 2006	Grace Kelly
308	21 February 2006	Howard Hughes
309	13 April 2006	Rita Hayworth
310	13 June 2006	Janis Joplin

=== Live ===
Between 11 and 13 November 2005, Dead Famous broadcast live over three nights from Los Angeles. The show was hosted by Christopher Parker. Gail Porter and Chris Fleming were present during the show. Medium Carla Barron joined the team in this live show.

== See also ==
- Ghost hunting
- Haunted house
