= Ross Finlay =

Scottish writer

- Born: 1937; Glasgow, Scotland
- Died: 15 December 2004 (aged 66–67); Glasgow, Scotland
- Known for: Writing
- Spouse: Patricia Finlay
- Children: 2

Ross Finlay (1937 – 15 December 2004) was a Scottish motoring journalist, travel writer, broadcaster and rally co-driver. He wrote travel guidebooks including for the AA and Reader's Digest as well as writing for newspapers and magazines including The Glasgow Herald and The Scotsman; he also presented Leisure Trail for BBC Radio Scotland.

== Rallying ==
Finlay's career as a rally navigator and co-driver started in the late 1950s. by the early 1960s he had become a member of the BMC works team where he raced with Logan Morrison in Minis and Austin-Healey 3000s. Other drivers he raced with including David Black, Ian Loudon Cox, Andrew Cowan, and Alistair Robertson. He retired from competition in the mid-1970s but continued to be involved in the sport as co-ordinator of the Scottish Rally Championship until 1980. He continued to organise sprint and hill climb events after this into the 1990s.

Together with former rally driver and later commentator Jimmy McInnes, Finlay was instrumental in forming what was to become the Veterans of Scottish Motorsport Association. They organised its first meeting at the Royal Scottish Automobile Club in Glasgow in 2001. Finlay did not live to see the association formally established in 2006 with Sir Jackie Stewart as its Honorary President.

== Journalism, writing and broadcasting ==
Finlay's writing career began he started writing for the magazine Motor World in the 1960s and later went on to become its editor. He also worked with the Scottish motoring magazine Top Gear. He became a freelance writer in 1970 and first wrote for the Glasgow Herald in1977, and remained a motoring contributor their until his death in 2004. He wrote thee books in the Touring Scotland series as well as Journeys Through Scotland for Hamlyn as part of their Touring Britain and Ireland series. He also wrote several guidebooks for the AA and Reader's Digest. Ross started his broadcasting career with BBC Radio Scotland as a motorsport reporter, before becoming a sports programme presenter. He then went on to present the Saturday morning show Leisure Trail during the early 1980s. In 1999 he founded the online motoring magazine CARkeys with his son David. CARkeys went on to became the motoring channel of the ITV.com website.

== Death ==
Finlay suffered a heart attack and crashed whist driving on the M8 near Glasgow on 15 December 2004 aged 67. He was survived by his wife Patricia, son David and daughter Susan.

== Jim Clark Memorial Award ==
In 2005 Finlay became the first person to be given Jim Clark Memorial Award posthumously. The award is presented annually by the Association of Scottish Motoring Writers, the President of the association Ally Ballingall described Finlay as "was a shy, unassuming man who was a giant in his profession" and an "acknowledge his outstanding contribution to motoring journalism and motorsport in Scotland." The award was presented to his widow Patricia and son David at a dinner in St. Andrews attended by Jim Clark's sister Betty Peddie.

== Select bibliography ==
- Armchair Rally Book, 1968, Allander Press Ltd.
- Touring Scotland series:
  - Touring Scotland: The Lowlands, 1969, G T Foulis & Co. Ltd., ISBN 0854290893, 9780854290895
  - Touring Scotland: The Unknown Highlands (Perth to Inverness), 1970, G T Foulis & Co Ltd., ISBN 0854291040, 978-0854291045
  - Touring Scotland: Wester Ross Kintail to Torridon, 1971, G T Foulis & Co Ltd., ISBN 085429113X, 978-0854291137
- Journey Trough Scotland, 1986, Hamlyn, London, ISBN 0863075282, 978-0863075285
- AA Touring Guides:
  - France, 1991, ISBN 0749501820, 978-0749501822
  - Britain, 1995, ISBN 0749510390
- Discovering Britain: an illustrated guide to more than 500 selected locations in Britain's unspoiled countryside, 1982, Reader's Digest/AA, Hodder & Stoughton Ltd., ISBN 0340280646, 9780340280645
- Journey Through Britain & Ireland, 1992, (with Rob Neillands, Roger Thomas and Terence Sheehy) Fraser Stewart, Essex, ISBN 1854355449, 978-1854355447
