= Psychic Kids =

American television series

- Also known as: Psychic Kids: Children of the Paranormal
- Genre: Paranormal Television; Reality; Docuseries
- Country of origin: United States
- Original language: English
- No. of seasons: 3
- No. of episodes: 21

Production
- Camera setup: Multiple
- Running time: 43 minutes

Original release
- Network: A&E
- Release: June 16, 2008 – November 28, 2010

Psychic Kids
- Genre: Paranormal Television; Reality; Docuseries
- Country of origin: United States
- Original language: English
- No. of seasons: 1
- No. of episodes: 8

Production
- Camera setup: Multiple
- Running time: 43 minutes

Original release
- Network: A&E
- Release: August 21 – September 29, 2019

Psychic Kids: Children of the Paranormal is a paranormal television series broadcast on the A&E television network. Hosted by Chip Coffey, an American psychic investigator, with licensed therapist Edy Nathan, "sensitive" Chris Fleming, and medium Kim Russo, the show brings together children who report having psychic abilities with adult psychic/mediums, with the stated purpose of "show[ing] them how to harness their abilities and, ultimately, [showing] them that they're not alone in this world". Later episodes feature content in correlation with another A&E paranormal series Coffey has appeared on, Paranormal State, with Ryan Buell.

The series premiered on June 16, 2008, and ran to November 28, 2010.

A&E later aired an episode of Biographies called "Psychic Children" about children and young people with the same alleged abilities described in the show (e.g. crystal children).

On June 26, 2019, A&E announced the revival of Psychic Kids was premiered on August 21, 2019,

== The Kids ==
The kids featured in the show allegedly possess varying psychic abilities which include precognition, clairvoyance, talking with the dead, sensing illnesses and diseases, psychometry and retrocognition. Typically the kids seen in the shows are being haunted by spirits and need help to control their abilities.

Kids from the series include Peri Zarrella, Ryan Michaels, Alex Curcio, Alana Stevens, and Nick Barger.

== Original Series ==
The original series premiered on June 16, 2008. A second season premiered on December 15, 2009, and the third and final season premiered on October 17, 2010.

=== Season 1 (2008) ===
No.	Title	Original release date	Viewers (millions)
1	"The Ghost of Freddie"	June 16, 2008	N/A
2	"Fear Management"	June 23, 2008	N/A
3	"The Demon House"	June 30, 2008	N/A
4	"Night Terrors"	July 7, 2008	N/A
5	"Angels and Demons"	July 14, 2008	N/A
6	"The Missing Person"	July 21, 2008	N/A

=== Season 2 (2009-10) ===
No.	Title	Original release date	Viewers (millions)
7	"Vanished"	December 15, 2009	N/A
8	"Family Secrets"	December 22, 2009	N/A
9	"Ghost School"	December 29, 2009	N/A
10	"Crossing Over"	January 5, 2010	N/A
11	"Demon in the Mirror"	January 12, 2010	N/A
12	"Haunted Attic"	January 19, 2010	N/A
13	"Terror in the Night"	January 26, 2010	N/A
14	"Spirits Among Us"	February 2, 2010	N/A

=== Season 3 (2010) ===
No.	Title	Original release date	Viewers (millions)
15	"Banishing Evil"	October 17, 2010	N/A
16	"Psychic Kids Investigates: The Lost Girl"	October 24, 2010	N/A
17	"Bloody Maryland"	October 31, 2010	N/A
18	"Psychic Kids Investigates: The Disappearance"	November 7, 2010	N/A
19	"The House of Spirits"	November 14, 2010	N/A
20	"Messages from the Dead: The Lizzie Borden Case"	November 21, 2010	N/A
21	"The Lost Soul"	November 28, 2010	N/A

== Reboot ==
A series reboot premiered on August 21, 2019. The new series shows kids from the original series (now adults) returning to help a new generation of psychic children.

Returning psychics include Peri Zarrella, Ryan Michaels, Alex Curcio and Nick Barger.

=== Season 1 (2019) ===
No.	Title	Original release date	Viewers (millions)
1	"The Ghost in the Bed"	August 21, 2019	0.62
2	"When Spirits Attach"	August 28, 2019	0.42
3	"Awake and Afraid"	September 4, 2019	N/A
4	"Spirit in the Mirror"	September 11, 2019	N/A
5	"Dangerous Games"	September 18, 2019	N/A
6	"Make the Spirits Stay"	September 29, 2019	N/A
7	"Ghost Sick"	September 29, 2019	N/A
8	"Living With Evil"	September 29, 2019	N/A

== Reception ==
One critic thought Psychic Kids was exploiting children, while some others felt that the psychic mentors in the show handled the situation carefully.
