= The Movie Chart Show =

- Also known as: Blockbuster Movie Update
- Presented by: Gail Porter; Mark Forrest; Steve McKenna; John Wright
- Theme music composer: Ivor Goldberg & Julian Hamlin 'Ngun Music' (2002 Theme Update) also refreshed Incidental music.
- Country of origin: United Kingdom

Production
- Producers: Kate Foster; Rob Butterfield
- Production company: Worldwide Entertainment News

Original release
- Network: Channel 5
- Release: 1999 – 2003

The Movie Chart Show is a British film criticism TV series. It was broadcast on Channel 5, and featured film news, reviews, previews, interviews, competitions, and a countdown on the top 10 films at the UK box office. The series was hosted from 24 January 1999 by Gail Porter with Mark Forrest, before presenting was taken over by Steve McKenna, who hosted the show until its cancellation in 2002. The Movie Chart Show was produced by Worldwide Entertainment News (a subsidiary of Mentorn Barraclough Carey), and distributed by Mentorn International (the distribution and sales arm of the Mentorn Group). It aired twice a week, on Mondays and Fridays, and was promoted to a primetime slot in July 1999.

The show was initially sponsored by Virgin Radio. When Virgin Radio agreed to a year of sponsorship by Blockbuster LLC in February 2000, sponsorship of The Movie Chart Show transferred to Blockbuster for six months, with the show being rebranded as the Blockbuster Movie Update. The sponsorship package also included advertising, promotions, on- and off-air competitions, with Mentorn Barraclough Carey producing a series of Blockbuster-branded idents to run during the show's commercial breaks and promos. In March 2001, The Movie Chart Show was deemed as unsuitable for screening before the 9 p.m. watershed by the Independent Television Commission.

== See also ==
- Lists of box office number-one films in the United Kingdom
