= Chris Fleming (TV personality) =

American television host

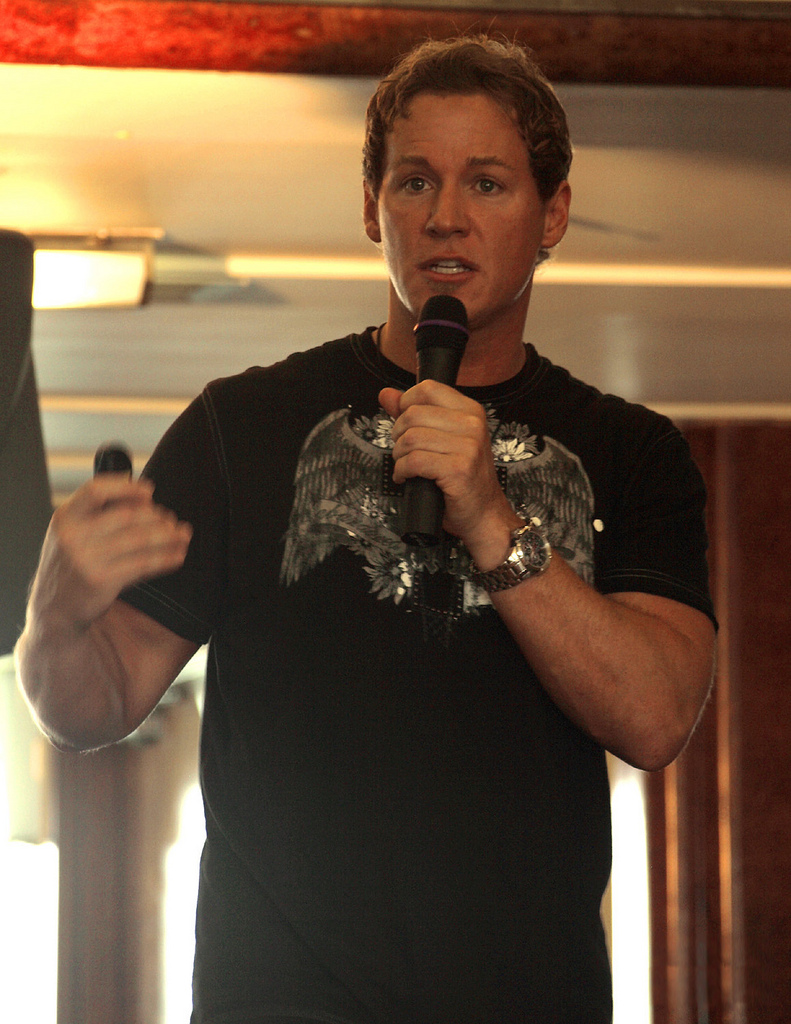
- Born: Christopher Fleming; 13 May 1967 (age 59); Chicago, Illinois, USA
- Education: Beloit College
- Occupations: Medium, paranormal researcher, Public Speaker
- Television: Dead Famous; Psychic Kids
- Parent(s): Reggie Fleming, Patricia Fleming

Christopher Fleming (born May 13, 1967) is an American medium, paranormal researcher, television personality, and public speaker. He has written numerous articles and produced various print and online publications on the topics of paranormal activity and psychic phenomena.

Fleming has appeared on several paranormal-themed television programs and is best known as the IPA award-winning co-host of the popular series Dead Famous (2004–06) which is still in syndication internationally. Fleming was also the co-host and featured psychic on A&E's Psychic Kids: Children of the Paranormal TV show. Fleming frequently speaks at events, colleges and universities throughout the United States about paranormal topics.

== Early life and career ==
Son of Chicago Blackhawks hockey player Reggie Fleming and Patricia Fleming, Chris Fleming was born in Chicago, Illinois, and is the elder of two children.

Raised Roman Catholic, he claims to have been experiencing spiritual and paranormal events since the age of four. He graduated in 1985 from William Fremd High School and 1989 from Beloit College in Wisconsin with a major in fine arts and minors in music and psychology with a specific concentration on Abnormal Psychology and Cognitive Psychology as well as Lateral Thinking and Creative Thinking.

He played football in high school and college as receiver and running back. While studying fine art in his second year at Beloit, he was the first student to have his own art show during Sophomore year.

He went on to have two separate art shows in his senior year due to his two different art styles; action painting reminiscent of Jackson Pollock and Pop Art influenced by Andy Warhol and Kenny Scharf. Two of his paintings (Titled Major Panic and 4th of July) were leased from the college for three years after his graduation, and one was used as a design for the class of 1989's graduation pamphlet. One of his paintings is part of a permanent collection at the Wright Museum of Art in Beloit, Wisconsin. He is a member of the Alpha Zeta chapter of Sigma Chi fraternity and was voted historian from 1987 to 1989.

After college, Chris worked as a graphic designer from 1990 to 1994 at Pioneer Press in Barrington, IL and then as an art director at Advo, Inc 1995–1997, creating marketing campaigns for companies such as Venture, Pizza Hut, Burger King, and various local and chain stores throughout the Chicago area. He left the industry working as a freelance designer for his father's company Reg Fleming Industries, Inc., completing commissioned works, and painting murals at such establishments as Harry D's Restaurant in Deerfield, IL.

While designing a corporate identity campaign for Sterling Mortgage, Inc in Chicago, IL he was coached by the president on how to be a loan officer. He quickly dove into the mortgage industry while maintaining his graphic design business Artform Graphics, Inc.

Late one night, during conversations with other loan officers over pizza, a co-worker told a story about a ghost he had seen the night before. Peers and co-workers from different backgrounds and cultures also shared their personal stories. Listening to their stories gave Chris an idea. After a trip to the local newsstand to pick up the latest copies of Fate (magazine) and UFO Magazine, he decided to use his graphic design abilities to publish his own periodical, Unknown Magazine.

For the next four years he created and marketed the publication. Additionally, he spoke on radio and television about his own personal experiences and the other, amazing stories he featured in the magazine. His belief was that people all over the world were having experiences that could not be fully explained.

Chris continued working in the Mortgage industry of the United States from 1997 to 2010 as a loan officer for such companies as Pillar Financial, LLC in Palatine, IL and 1st American Mortgage in Schaumburg, IL, until resigning to concentrate more on his passion for paranormal research, travelling, speaking and book-writing.

Chris continued participating in sports in local communities, playing men's softball and full contact Flag football. In the late 1990s he coached and played on a full contact Flag football team he put together called The Raptors in Lake Zurich, IL. Over three years they went 34–5, losing the championship their first year. In their second year they went undefeated and in their third year, lost four games. A season-ending knee injury in his third year made him leave sports entirely.

In the early '90s he began investigating with local ghost hunting groups at local haunts visiting such sites as the Red Lion Pub in Chicago, IL and Bachelor's Grove Cemetery in Midlothian, IL.

== Career as a medium ==
In Fleming's publications, and in his television and public appearances, he claims that he has been having psychic and paranormal experiences since the age of four. He claims that their movement via thoughts and their telepathic abilities eventually became more of an interest of study rather than a fear.

Over a period of time he claims he was in contact with a spirit named Henry that would warn him about other ghosts and entities as well as tell him things about the universe and people he knew. One conversation with Henry, in particular, stands out in Fleming's writings and lectures. Fleming claims that when he asked Henry if there was any life on planets in the Solar System, the response was on "Europa" and when asked what type of life, the response was, "Plant and bacteria."

Fleming claims to have conversed with Henry on the Ouija board from 1975 to 1979 before Henry stopped interacting with Fleming. It wasn't until the late 1990s that Fleming overheard on CNN that scientists now believe there is life on Europa, one of planet Jupiter's moons.

Fleming currently travels around to speak at events, colleges, and universities about various paranormal topics.

== Television and radio appearances ==
In 1985, Fleming won a contest on WVVX 103.1 (now known as WPNA-FM ) for the Angus Young look-alike contest. He appeared on stage with AC/DC during their Who Made Who Tour at Poplar Creek Music Theater for the opening number "Who Made Who" and was selected the winner out of eight finalists. He appeared on the WVVX radio show with Scott Loftus afterwards and won a replica of Angus Young's Gibson SG guitar and their entire AC/DC catalogue.

For two years (2004–2006), Fleming was the co-host of the popular TV show Dead Famous, where he joined co-host Gail Porter in search of celebrity ghosts across the United States. Their search took them not only to grave sites, but to some of the most reportedly haunted locations in the U.S. The show is still being broadcast in over 15 countries, including the Bravo network in Canada, Living TV in the UK, and The Biography Channel in the U.S. The three season span consisted of 26 episodes, two "Return" specials and three live episodes.

In 2007, Fleming made a guest appearance on Syfy's Ghost Hunters on Season 3, Episode 12, titled, "Manson Murders".

In addition to Help, My House Is Haunted, Psychic Kids, Dead Famous, and Ghost Hunters, Fleming has also made appearances on Born Country, Ghost Adventures, Larry King Live, Reality Obsessed, Scariest Places on Earth, Showbiz Tonight, The Haunted, Coast to Coast AM with George Noory, and Paranormal Challenge.

In 2009, Fleming appeared as a guest investigator on the Ghost Adventures Halloween Special at the Trans-Allegheny Lunatic Asylum in Weston, WV.

In 2009, Fleming received the International Paranormal Acknowledgment (IPA) Awards for Best Spiritual/Psychic Medium Male TV Personality, Best National Spirit Medium Male, and Best International Paranormal TV Program winner: Dead Famous.

Fleming documented his father, Reggie Fleming from 2007 to 2009 while his father attempted to recover from a stroke and heart attack. He resided at the Claremont Rehab and Living Center in Buffalo Grove, IL before he died on July 11, 2009. The videos can be seen on YouTube and have been seemingly praised by children and parents across the globe in their comments and responses. It has sparked Fleming to begin writing a book about his father and the last years they shared together.

In 2011, Fleming made an appearance with the Paranormal Cops on an Italian TV series called Voyagers. They investigated the allegedly haunted building known as Casa Madrid in Chicago, IL and their voices were dubbed in Italian.

In 2011, Fleming co-produced, along with Picture Shack Entertainment, a one-hour special called Raising The Dead about his shamanistic trip to Jamaica to learn the practice of Obeah and Myal. The special aired on Animal Planet in 2012.

At the start of 2022, Fleming was a presenter of Spooked Scotland (or branded as Haunted Scotland for the American audience) alongside Gail Porter.

== Unknown Magazine ==
After months of being approached and hearing others talk about their own experiences, Fleming chose to document these by creating his own publication called Unknown Magazine: Real Experiences of Unusual Phenomena, which ran from 1997 to 2001. As publisher, art director, writer, and editor, Fleming set out to create a magazine for people across the globe through which to share their first-hand encounters.

In 1997, Fleming launched UnknownMagazine.com. In 2001, he stopped production of Unknown Magazine, but continued his work solely through the website. Fleming currently hosts and produces a monthly, online podcast, Spirit Talk. This podcast focuses on supernatural, paranormal, and spiritual topics.
