= Richard Evans (radio presenter) =

Welsh journalist and broadcaster

Richard William Gilmour Evans
- Born: 17 February 1958 (age 68); Swansea, Wales
- Education: Llanelli Boys Grammar Technical School; University of Bath (Electrical Engineering); City University, London (Journalism)
- Occupations: Journalist, Broadcaster, Journalism educator
- Known for: BBC Radio presenter, teaching journalism at City University London

Richard William Gilmour Evans (born 17 February 1958) is a Welsh journalist and broadcaster.

He was born in Swansea and educated at Llanelli Boys Grammar Technical School. He studied Electrical Engineering at the University of Bath before studying journalism at City University, London.

He trained as a newspaper reporter for the South Wales Argus before joining Radio West in Bristol. He presented Newsbeat on BBC Radio One from 1988 to 2000 and was the news presenter on the Zoë Ball Breakfast Show. He reported for the Today Programme, The World at One and PM and presented Summer School and Points of Law on BBC Radio 4 and between 1994 and 2007 Breakfast, Drive, The Weekend News, The Midday News, Up All Night, After Hours, and Late Night Live on BBC Radio 5 Live and until December 2008 Good Morning Wales and The Radio Wales Phone In on BBC Radio Wales.

Between 2011 and 2024 he taught journalism and educational development at City, University of London.

Since 2024 he has been working as an announcer on BBC Radio 4. He lives in London.
