= Iain Purdon =

- Occupations: Newsreader; Continuity Announcer
- Notable credit(s): BBC World Service, BBC Radio 2, BBC Radio Scotland

Iain Purdon is a retired broadcaster.

== Biography ==
Iain Purdon was born in Edinburgh. After school education in the South of England he returned to Scotland and joined the city hospital radio service while at the University of Edinburgh. He went on to work in various computer-related jobs while attempting to pursue a radio career.

He joined BBC Scotland in May 1973 as a newsreader and continuity announcer for the Radio 4 Scotland opt-out service. From 1975-1978 he was also a regular TV announcer on BBC One Scotland. He was appointed to lead the announcer team at the launch of BBC Radio Scotland in 1978, also presenting music and magazine programmes. In 1982 he moved to BBC Radio 2 where he became editor of the presentation team until 1993. After a year in local radio journalism at BBC CWR, followed by a spell of freelancing with BBC Radio 4 and BFBS UK, he moved in April 1995 to the BBC World Service delivering news bulletins and summaries to radio audiences around the world. Iain Purdon presented the last ever bulletin from Bush House at 11.00 GMT on 12 July 2012 before moving immediately to complete his shift at Broadcasting House. He retired from the BBC staff in October 2013 but continued to work as an occasional relief newsreader on the World Service until May 2016.
