= Nigel Rees =

English writer and broadcaster

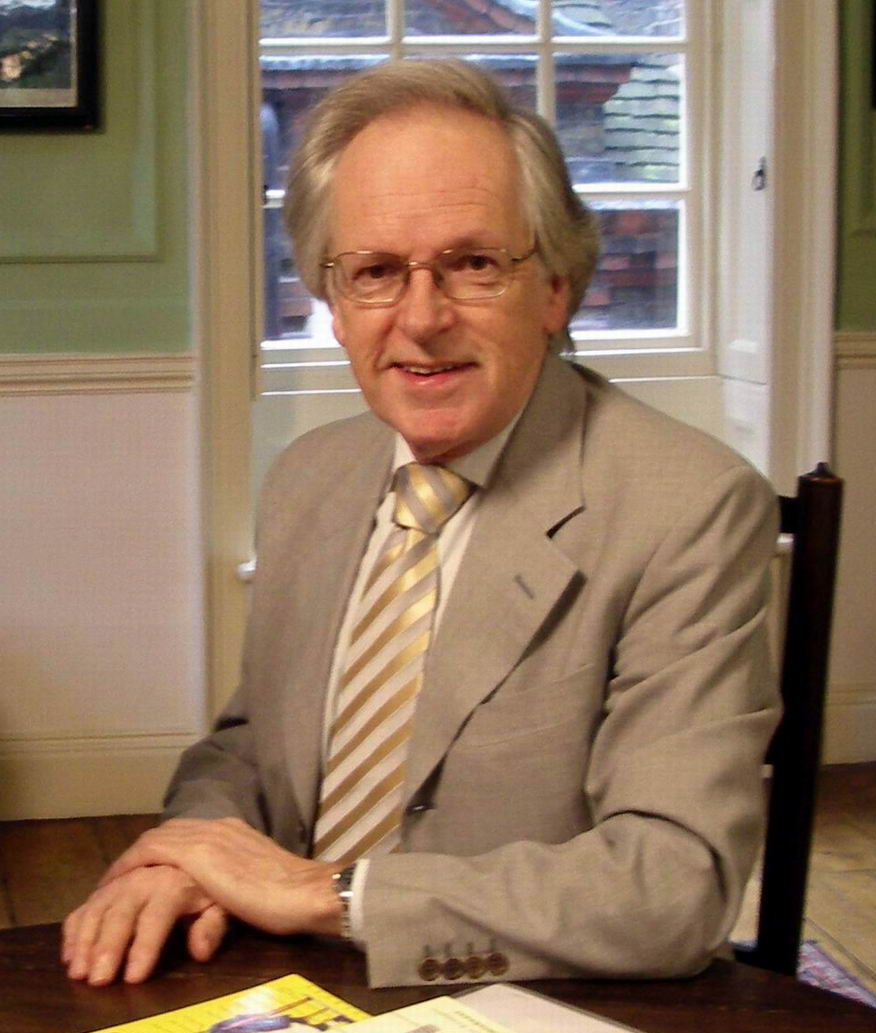
- Rees at Dr Johnson's house in 2012
- Born: 5 June 1944 (age 82); Merseyside, England
- Education: Merchant Taylors' Boys' School, Crosby
- Alma mater: New College, Oxford
- Occupations: Writer and broadcaster
- Spouse: Sue Bates (m. 1978)

Nigel Rees (born 5 June 1944 near Liverpool) is an English writer and broadcaster, known for devising and hosting the Radio 4 panel game Quote... Unquote (1976–2021) and as the author of more than fifty books, mostly works of reference on language, and humour in language.

== Early life ==
Rees attended Merchant Taylors' School, Crosby, near Liverpool where he was born, and then studied for a degree in English at New College, Oxford, where he was a Trevelyan Scholar and took a leading role in the Oxford University Broadcasting Society.

Rees is a past President of the Lichfield Johnson Society and was described in The Spectator as "Britain's most popular lexicographer – the lineal successor to Eric Partridge and, like him, he makes etymology fun."

== Television and radio ==
After leaving university, Rees went straight into television with Granada in Manchester and made his first TV appearances on local programmes in 1967 before moving to London as a freelance. He worked for ITN's News at Ten as a reporter before becoming involved in programmes for BBC Radio as reporter and producer.

In 1971, he turned to presenting. He introduced the BBC World Service current affairs magazine Twenty Four Hours between 1972 and 1979. From 1973 to 1975 he was also a regular presenter of Radio 4's arts magazine Kaleidoscope. From 1976 to 1978, he was the founder presenter of Radio 4's newspaper review Between the Lines and, from 1984 to 1986, Stop Press.

Rees kept up the revue acting he had started at Oxford by appearing for five years in Radio 4's topical comedy show Week Ending..., in The Betty Witherspoon Show with Ted Ray, Kenneth Williams and Miriam Margolyes, and then in all six series of the comedy The Burkiss Way. Comedy appearances have also included Harry Enfield and Chums on BBC TV.

In 1976, he became the youngest ever regular presenter of Radio 4's Today programme, at the age of 32. He presented the programme for two years with Brian Redhead before leaving in May 1978 at the time of his marriage to Sue Bates, a marketing executive. Quote... Unquote, his quiz anthology on Radio 4, was by then in its third series. Co-developed with John Lloyd, the series continued until 2021.

In 1990, Rees became the first celebrity winner of the Channel 4 quiz show Fifteen to One, finishing with a score of 141 points.

Widely recognised as host and participant in quizzes and panel games, he has been chairman of TV's Cabbages and Kings (quotations), Challenge of the South (general knowledge), Amoebas to Zebras (natural history) and First Things First (panel game) – all on ITV. For 18 years, he was a regular guest in Dictionary Corner on Channel 4's Countdown.

== Writing ==
In 1978, he wrote the first Quote... Unquote book, which led to a series under varying titles and devoted to aspects of the English language and especially the humour that derives from it. One of his five graffiti collections was a No. 1 paperback best-seller in the UK. Since 1992, he has published and edited The Quote... Unquote Newsletter, a quarterly journal (now distributed electronically) and devoted to the origins and use of well-known quotations, phrases and sayings. In 2011, his autobiography, My Radio Times, was published.

Reference books he has written or compiled include Cassell's Movie Quotations, Cassell's Humorous Quotations, A Word in Your Shell-Like and Brewer's Famous Quotations. In The Yale Book of Quotations, Fred Shapiro describes Rees as a "pioneering quotation scholar".

== Selected bibliography ==
- Graffiti Lives OK (1979) ISBN 0-04-827018-0
- Cassell Dictionary of Word and Phrase Origins (1987) ISBN 0-304-32050-1
- The Bloomsbury Dictionary of Popular Phrases (1990) ISBN 0-7475-0344-3
- Politically Correct Phrasebook (1993) ISBN 0-7475-1426-7
- Cassell's Movie Quotations (2000) ISBN 0-304-35369-8
- Cassell's Humorous Quotations (2001) ISBN 0-304-35720-0
- I Told You I Was Sick (2005) ISBN 0-304-36803-2
- A Word in Your Shell-Like (2005) ISBN 0-00-722087-1
- Brewer's Famous Quotations (2006) ISBN 0-304-36799-0
- A Man About a Dog – Euphemisms &c (2006) ISBN 0-00-721453-7
- All Gong and No Dinner – Homely Phrases and Curious Domestic Sayings (2007) ISBN 978-0-00-724935-0
- Don't You Know There's a War On? (2011) ISBN 978-1-906388-99-7
- My Radio Times (2011) ISBN 978-1-482399-46-2
