= Ectoplasm (radio show) =

British radio series

- Genre: Situation comedy
- Running time: 30 minutes
- Country of origin: United Kingdom
- Language: English
- Home station: BBC Radio 4
- Starring: Dan Freedman; Nick Romero; Sophie Aldred; Peter Donaldson; Owen Oakeshott; Colin Guthrie
- Written by: Dan Freedman; Nick Romero
- Produced by: Helen Williams
- Original release: 11 July – 1 August 2000
- No. of series: 1
- No. of episodes: 4
- Audio format: Stereophonic sound

Ectoplasm is a 2000 BBC Radio 4 comedy series written by and starring Dan Freedman and Nick Romero. Unlike the other radio work of Freedman and Romero, this series features single, coherent stories in each episode; certain motifs do, however, appear in all of the tales, e.g. Theremin's murder attempts.

== Plot ==
The stories follow the adventures of Lord Zimbabwe (Romero), a "walker in the ether", or occult investigator; his friend and collaborator Doctor Lilac (Freedman), a German scientist who has invented various machines, including a time machine and a teleporter, and who breaks into megalomaniacal ravings at inopportune moments; Theremin (Peter Donaldson), Zimbabwe's butler, an abusive, murderous, incompetent servant who refuses to carry out any of Zimbabwe's instructions; and Schrödinger, a semi-corporeal cat that exists in a superposition of quantum states of life and death (cf Schrödinger's Cat), and is sexually attracted to women. Each adventure is initiated by a request by a different woman (all played by Sophie Aldred) for Lord Zimbabwe to help her.

== Humour ==
As is characteristic of Freedman and Romero's work, much of the humour is derived from puns, although Theremin's abuse, Doctor Lilac's experiments (he is about to perform a bizarre experiment when Lord Zimbabwe first approaches him in each show; for example giving a woodlouse PMT) and interrupted diatribes, and Lord Zimbabwe's use of strange similes ("The secret to success, my dear Doctor, is like the aftermath of a Bombay banquet: one must keep going.") all contribute. Recurrent motifs include telephone calls from Sherlock Holmes seeking advice, and references to evil shape-changing pixie creatures (Agatha Christie's character Hercule Poirot appears in one episode; he blames all crimes on these pixie creatures.)

The influence of Douglas Adams's "The Hitchhiker's Guide to the Galaxy" can be detected, as in the doctor character, reminiscent of the HHGG psychiatrist.

Each show ends with Lord Zimbabwe saying "I think we handled that rather well," and Theremin answering "I couldn't agree less, sir."

== Episode list ==
| Episode | Title | First broadcast |
|---|---|---|
| 1 | The Curse of Tutancommon | 11 July 2000 |
| 2 | The Case of the Missing Lost Soul | 18 July 2000 |
| 3 | The Affair of the Baddie's Niece | 25 July 2000 |
| 4 | The Adventure of the Stupid, Ignorant Americans | 1 August 2000 |
