= Harriet Cass =

- Born: 4 February 1952 (age 74); Middlesex, England
- Occupations: Newsreader; Continuity Announcer
- Employer: BBC Radio 4

Harriet R M Cass (born 4 February 1952) is a freelance broadcaster, best known for her work on BBC Radio 4 as a senior announcer, with responsibility for newsreading and continuity.

Born in London NW10, at the Central Middlesex Hospital, the fourth daughter of Edward G Cass and Ruth M Cass, Cass was educated at Queen's College, Harley Street, an independent day school for girls in London.

She joined the BBC in 1972 as a secretary, before becoming a studio manager and then announcer on Radio 4 in 1977. Later she became a sub-editor and Chief sub-editor in the BBC Radio Newsroom and then worked on the Radio 4 programme Today in Parliament. In 1996, she re-joined Radio 4, after some years away from the network, and after 1998 worked mainly as a newsreader, including on The News Quiz. In 2003, with Chris Aldridge, she was promoted to the post of senior announcer, after Peter Donaldson stepped down. For a time, she was the station's presentation editor.

In September 2012 it was announced that Cass would leave the BBC, having opted for voluntary redundancy as the result of reorganisation. She left Radio 4 on 21 March 2013, her final broadcast being the Six O'clock News bulletin. She is now a freelance broadcaster.
