= King Harvest =

French-American rock band

- Origin: Ithaca, New York, U.S. (1969); Paris, France (1971)
- Genres: Rock; pop rock
- Years active: 1969–1976, 2012–2016
- Labels: Perception, A&M, Darbo Music
- Past members: Dave "Doc" Robinson; Ron Altbach; Ed Tuleja; Rod Novak; Sherman Kelly; Wells Kelly; Steve Cutler; Didier Alexandre; David Montgomery; Tony Cahill; Bobby Figueroa; Richie Pidanick; Hugh “The Killer” Keller

King Harvest was a 1970s French-American rock band which was formed initially in Ithaca, New York, U.S., but broke up and reformed in Paris where they began recording their first songs. They are known for their 1972 hit "Dancing in the Moonlight". They took their name after the 1969 song "King Harvest (Has Surely Come)" by the Band, one of their musical influences.

== History ==
=== Origin and overview ===
King Harvest's original four members first formed the group in 1969 in Ithaca, New York, where all four — Dave "Doc" Robinson (lead vocals/bass/keyboards), Ron Altbach (keyboards), Ed Tuleja (guitar), and Rod Novak (saxophone) — were attending Cornell University. At this point, the group primarily played cover tunes by such artists as Sly and the Family Stone, Jimi Hendrix, and The Band, among others, at fraternities, bars, and other local colleges. But the group broke up for the first time in 1971.

However, one by one, each of the four former bandmates would migrate to Paris that same year, where they reformed King Harvest, now as expatriates. Although the band's membership fluctuated constantly over the next five years, it always included its four core co-founders. French musician Didier Alexandre was among the first to join the quartet, becoming a member of the group in the early 1970s. At one point, the band consisted of three keyboardists, with fellow Cornell alumnus Sherman Kelly (who wrote "Dancing in the Moonlight") joining Altbach and Robinson on the instrument. Sherman Kelly had previously performed together with Robinson in the band Boffalongo, who first recorded "Dancing in the Moonlight" in 1970. Sherman Kelly's brother, drummer Wells Kelly, who went on to form the band Orleans, also served for a brief time in the group both in Paris and in the US.

=== Early years in Paris ===
As group members gradually made their way to Paris, they became involved in session work individually, performing on albums by the likes of Jacques Morali and Nancy Holloway. Altbach also studied classical music with Nadia Boulanger. Once solidified as a unit, King Harvest won a Rock and Roll contest/talent show, and by the end of 1971, with Alexandre and Wells Kelly now established as band members, the group had recorded and released their Europe-only debut LP, I Can Tell. Although Doc Robinson is apparently pictured on the album cover, he is not credited in the liner notes as having performed on the album. (It is possible that he had not yet made the journey to France in time to participate in the recording but arrived in time to be photographed.)

Also in 1971, King Harvest was invited to write and perform songs for the French film, Le Feu Sacré, which represented France at that year's Cannes Film Festival. Throughout these early days in Paris, King Harvest also performed and recorded under pseudonyms, such as E. Rodney Jones and the Prairie Dogs.

=== "Dancing in the Moonlight" song ===
Wells Kelly convinced the group to revisit "Dancing in the Moonlight", but he left Paris (eventually co-founding Orleans back in upstate New York in early 1972) before the song was recorded. Steve Cutler, a jazz drummer and fellow expatriate from New York, joined King Harvest for their last six months in Paris, recording "Dancing in the Moonlight" and playing clubs and concerts in Paris and London. Reportedly, Cutler performed the drum/percussion parts on the recording using a toilet scrubbing brush, as opposed to the traditional drumsticks. The song was produced by Jack Robinson of Robin Song Music. Contrary to Boffalongo's original version, which included such disparate players as jazz flutist Jeremy Steig and Peter Giansante on drums, the King Harvest recording was more scaled back. A 45 rpm record of "Dancing in the Moonlight" was released in Paris, with "Lady, Come on Home" on the B-side. The single languished, and the group again (temporarily) disbanded.

However in 1972, "Dancing in the Moonlight" began to generate interest back home in America, where the original four members signed with the Perception label. Perception promptly leased the tune from France's Musidisc Records and prepared the group, now re-established in Olcott, New York, to record a full-length album titled after the single. Meanwhile, the single went on to reach No. 13 in the US in early 1973 and No. 5 in Canada, and the band embarked on a lengthy U.S. tour. Australian drummer David Montgomery and bassist Tony Cahill, both of Python Lee Jackson (and the latter also of The Easybeats) officially joined King Harvest after the album's release and toured with them during the spring of 1973. "Dancing in the Moonlight" composer Sherman Kelly, who had not participated in King Harvest's recording of the single, also officially joined the band for the first time for this tour.

=== Subsequent career ===
Despite the success of its titular single, the Dancing in the Moonlight album failed to crack the top 100 on the Billboard 200 or generate any widely successful follow-up singles, and the Perception label soon went bankrupt. Band membership continued to fluctuate. The original four members joined with LA-based Buffalo Rock and Roll Hall of Fame drummer Richie Pidanick in 1974. With support from Beach Boys Carl Wilson and Mike Love, this line-up signed with A&M Records and recorded another album, simply titled King Harvest. Released in 1975, this album did not produce any hits, with lone single "Hickory", a cover of the Four Seasons song, failing to chart. Fellow Beach Boy Bobby Figueroa (drums) also became a member of the band during these later years. Finding themselves unable to match the success of their massive first hit, King Harvest broke up once again in 1976.

Following the band's dissolution, King Harvest's members continued their association with the Beach Boys. Novak, Altbach, Tuleja, and Figueroa toured with the group at one point. Tuleja and Novak also played on Dennis Wilson's 1977 solo Pacific Ocean Blue, while Altbach and Robinson performed with Mike Love in his band, Celebration.

=== Reunions and other post-2000 activities ===
Novak and Tuleja went on to play country western in Scandinavia and released the album King Harvest – The Prairie Dogs' Classic Country produced by George Doering. Their recording of "Looking for Love" from the album later appeared in the 2014 film OK Buckeroos – The Life, Music and Good Times of Jerry Jeff Walker.

King Harvest released their The Lost Tapes album in August 2007, and performed on TJ Lubinsky's My Music DVD entitled The 70s Experience Live produced for PBS.

On July 14, 2012 the four co-founders reunited in Olcott Beach as part of a 40th anniversary reunion of the band. Robinson died December 11, 2012, leaving behind his wife, daughter and grandchildren. He was buried in Cleveland, Ohio, his birthplace. The other three members reunited again on July 19, 2013, in Olcott Beach with a song titled "Doc" in memory of him.

The King Harvest album Old Friends was released on April 6, 2015.

The three surviving founding members released their new King Harvest single "Our Old Songs" on August 16, 2016.

Ron Altbach died on February 21, 2023, at the age of 76.

== Discography ==
=== Albums ===
Year	Album	Album details	Peak chart positions		
Year	Album	Album details	US	US R&B	CAN
1971	I Can Tell (Europe release only)	Released: 1971; Label: Bellaphon/Calumet	x	x	x
1973	Dancing in the Moonlight	Released: January 1973; Label: Perception	136	50	—
1975	King Harvest	Released: June 5, 1975; Label: A&M	—	—	—
1980	Young Love	Released: January 1, 1980; Label: A&M	—	—	—
1993	Dancing in the Moonlight (CD re-issue)	Released: November 1993; Label: Collectables Records	—	—	—
2007	The Lost Tapes	Released: August 30, 2007; Label: Darbo Music LLC	—	—	—
2010	The Prairie Dogs – Country Classics	Released: April 1, 2010; Label: Prairie Dog Productions	—	—	—
2013	Caribbean (EP)	Released: November 22, 2013; Label: King Harvest Productions	—	—	—
2014	Young Love (possible re-release)	Released: September 9, 2014; Label: King Harvest Productions	—	—	—
2015	Old Friends	Released: April 6, 2015; Label: MondoTunes	—	—	—
"—" and "x" denote recordings that did not chart or were not released in that territory.

=== Singles ===
Year	Name	Peak chart positions					
Year	Name	US BB	US AC	US CB	US RW	CAN	CAN AC
1971	"A Train"	—	—	—	—	—	—
1971	"Roosevelt and Ira Lee"	—	—	—	—	—	—
1971	"Musique Du Film 'Le Feu Sacré'"	—	—	—	—	—	—
1971	"You and I"	—	—	—	—	—	—
1972	"Dancing in the Moonlight"	13	22	10	15	5	69
1973	"A Little Bit Like Magic"	91	—	87	73	—	—
1973	"(Take It Easy) Take It Slow"	—	—	—	133	—	—
1973	"Give Me a Sign" / "Jesse's Going Away Song"	—	—	—	—	—	—
1974	"Celestial Navigator"	—	—	—	118	—	—
1975	"Hickory"	—	—	—	—	—	—
2016	"Our Old Songs"	—	—	—	—	—	—
"—" denotes a recording that did not chart or was not released in that territory.

== Band members ==
=== Famous ===
- Dave Robinson – vocals, bass guitar (1970–1976; died 2012)
- Eddy Tuleja – guitar (1970–1976)
- Ron Altbach – keyboards (1970–1976; died 2023)
- Rod Novak – saxophone, (1972–1976)
- Didier Alexandre – bass (1970–1974)
- Wells Kelly – drums (1970–1971; died 1984)

=== Other former members ===
- Paul Harris – saxophone, flute, keyboards (1970–1972)
- Steve Cutler – drums (1971–1972)
- David Montgomery – drums (1972–1974)
- Tony Cahill – bass (1972–1974)
- Sherman Kelly – keyboards (1973)
- Richie Pidanick – drums (1974–1975)
- Bobby Figueroa – drums (1975–1976)

== See also ==
- List of 1970s one-hit wonders in the United States
