= Magic Hotel =

Studio album by Toploader
- Released: 19 August 2002
- Recorded: 2001–2002
- Studios: RAK Studios, London, Ocean Way Recording, Los Angeles
- Genres: Post-Britpop; alternative rock
- Length: 42:40
- Label: S2
- Producers: George Drakoulias, Dave Eringa

Toploader chronology
Onka's Big Moka (1999)	Magic Hotel (2002)	Dancing in the Moonlight – The Best of Toploader (2009)

Professional ratings
Review scores
Source	Rating
Daily Record	(unfavourable)
Evening Standard	(mixed)
The Guardian	2/5 stars
The Mirror	(scathing)
New Straits Times	2.5/5 stars
NME	(1/10)
Stylus Magazine	(F)

Magic Hotel is the second album by English band Toploader. Released in 2002, it is a follow-up to their 1999 album Onka's Big Moka. The album title is a reference to a Los Angeles hotel where the band lived while recording the album.

Critical reviews were harshly negative, and sales of the album were disappointing compared to their debut. As a result Toploader was dropped by S2 Records, and the band broke up before reforming in 2009.

== Track listing ==
1. "Time of My Life" – 03:35
2. "Cloud 9" – 03:34
3. "Never Forgotten" – 03:31
4. "Leave Me Be" – 03:29
5. "Lady Let Me Shine" – 05:02
6. "Stupid Games" – 03:29
7. "Following The Sun" - 03:08
8. "Only Desire" – 04:03
9. "Promised Tide" – 04:14
10. "The Midas Touch" – 05:27
11. "Some Kind of Wonderful" – 03:13

== Weekly charts ==
Chart (2002)	Peak position
Irish Albums (IRMA)	36
Scottish Albums (Official Charts)	3
UK Albums (Official Charts)	3

== Certifications ==
Region	Certification	Certified units/sales
United Kingdom (BPI)	Silver	60,000^{^}
^{^} Shipments figures based on certification alone.
