= Laurie Macmillan =

Laurie Macmillan (10 May 1947 – 8 October 2001) was a BBC Radio 4 newsreader and continuity announcer born in Aberdeen on the east coast of Scotland.

She was educated at Haberdashers' Monmouth School for Girls, Monmouthshire and then at Newcastle University graduating with a degree in Politics and Philosophy.

She joined the BBC in 1968 as a Trainee Studio Manager, became a studio manager in 1973 and an announcer in 1975. Worked on The World at One, PM, It's Your Line and You and Yours on BBC Radio 4, also occasionally working on BBC Radio 3 and BBC Local Radio, and briefly reading the news on Newsnight on BBC2.

When the BBC chose to feature the midnight Shipping Forecast as part of an evening of programmes devoted to radio on BBC2 in 1993, Laurie MacMillan was the duty announcer on BBC Radio 4 who read the forecast.

She died on 8 October 2001 in Okehampton, Devon from breast cancer.
