= Peter Jefferson (radio personality) =

Peter Jefferson (born May 1945) is a former BBC Radio 4 continuity announcer.

He was educated at the independent Halliford School in Shepperton, Middlesex. He joined the BBC in 1964 and became a Studio Manager in 1968. During this period, he worked for Radio 1, and read the news during the DJ Kenny Everett's programme.

Jefferson retired in 2001, though he continued to work as a freelancer until 2009. In May 2005 he stood in as a newsreader during strike action by other staff. He is often dubbed "Voice of the Shipping Forecast". He has also read the quotations in the Radio 4 quiz game Quote, Unquote. Jefferson lives in Weybridge, Surrey.
