= Onka's Big Moka =

Studio album by Toploader
- Released: 22 May 2000
- Recorded: 1998–1999
- Studios: RAK, London; Ocean Way Recording, Los Angeles
- Genres: Post-Britpop; alternative rock
- Length: 48:02
- Label: S2
- Producer: Dave Eringa

Toploader chronology
Onka's Big Moka (2000)	Magic Hotel (2002)

Singles from Onka's Big Moka
- 1. "Achilles Heel" Released: 3 May 1999; 2. "Let the People Know" Released: 26 July 1999; 3. "Dancing in the Moonlight" Released: 21 February 2000; 4. "Only for a While" Released: 9 April 2001

Professional ratings
Review scores
Source	Rating
AllMusic	3/5 stars
BBC	Favourable link
Blender	2/5 stars
New Straits Times	3/5 stars
Select	1/5 stars
USA Today	3/4 stars

Onka's Big Moka is the debut studio album by English band Toploader, which was released on 22 May 2000, through S2 Records. Having been recorded between 1998 and 1999, it was produced by long time collaborator of the Manic Street Preachers, Dave Eringa. After its release, the album reached number 4 on the UK Albums Chart and stayed on the chart for six months.

The song "Dancing in the Moonlight", a cover of the Boffalongo song, was later featured in television commercials for the supermarket chain Sainsbury's, on the soundtrack of the 2002 American coming-of-age teen romantic drama A Walk to Remember, the 2010 comedy film Four Lions, and the 2019 television series The Umbrella Academy.

The album cover was taken at Lancaster Gate, located in the Bayswater district of Central London, while the title is a reference to the 1974 anthropological documentary Ongka's Big Moka: The Kawelka of Papua New Guinea.

== Track listing ==
All tracks written by Joseph Washbourn, except tracks 2 & 7.

1. "Let the People Know" – 3:54
2. "Dancing in the Moonlight" (Sherman Kelly) – 3:52
3. "Achilles Heel" – 4:18
4. "Breathe" – 3:56
5. "Do You Know What Your Future Will Be?" – 4:24
6. "Only for a While" – 3:51
7. "Just Hold On" (Dave Smith, Tim Woodcock, Mike Terry) – 4:01
8. "Higher State" – 3:11
9. "High Flying Bird" – 4:10
10. "Summer Cycle" – 4:38
11. "Just About Living" – 4:01
12. "Floating Away (In the Bath Tub)" – 3:22

== Charts ==
=== Weekly charts ===
Weekly chart performance for Onka's Big Moka
Chart (2000–2001)	Peak position
Australian Albums (ARIA)	99
Danish Albums (Hitlisten)	36
Dutch Albums (Album Top 100)	86
German Albums (Offizielle Top 100)	43
Irish Albums (IRMA)	6
Scottish Albums (Official Charts)	3
Swiss Albums (Schweizer Hitparade)	85
UK Albums (Official Charts)	4

=== Year-end charts ===
Year-end chart performance for Onka's Big Moka
Chart (2000)	Position
UK Albums (OCC)	25
Chart (2001)	Position
UK Albums (OCC)	29

== Certifications ==
Certifications for Onka's Big Moka
Region	Certification	Certified units/sales
New Zealand (RMNZ)	Platinum	15,000^{‡}
United Kingdom (BPI)	3× Platinum	900,000^{^}
^{^} Shipments figures based on certification alone.^{‡} Sales+streaming figures based on certification alone.
