= Peter Donaldson (newsreader) =

British radio announcer and newsreader

- Born: 23 August 1945; Cairo, Egypt
- Died: 2 November 2015 (aged 70)
- Occupations: Journalist, Presenter, Newsreader
- Notable credit(s): BBC Radio 2, Radio Hallam, BBC Radio 4
- Spouse: Aileen Crerar (m. 1973)
- Children: 3

Peter Ian Donaldson (23 August 1945 – 2 November 2015) was an English newsreader on BBC Radio 4.

== Early life ==
Donaldson was born in Cairo, Egypt, and moved to Cyprus in 1952 at the time of the overthrow of King Farouk. He was a frequent listener to the BBC World Service and the British Forces Broadcasting Service (BFBS).

On his return to Britain, Donaldson was educated at Woolverstone Hall School, a state boarding school in Suffolk, from the age of 14. He left after taking O-levels at 16 and joined Sadler's Wells London in a backstage role. After working with the New Shakespeare Company at the Open Air Theatre in Regent's Park London, and appearing on stage at the Aldwych Theatre London with the Royal Shakespeare Company, he went to Sri Lanka to work on a film.

In 1968 his father, who was still living in Cyprus, heard about an on-air vacancy for announcers with BFBS and Donaldson applied. He passed the audition and subsequently worked in Cyprus, Aden, Libya and Malta.

== BBC Radio career ==
He joined BBC Radio 2 in 1970 as a presenter and newsreader but switched to Radio 4 in 1973. However, in the autumn of 1974 he joined the presentation team of Radio Hallam, the commercial independent local radio station located in Sheffield and serving South Yorkshire and the North Midlands, before it began broadcasting on 1 October that year. He returned to the BBC after about a month and was promoted to Chief Announcer in 1988.

He gave up the post of Chief Announcer and Head of Continuity in 2003 and retired in July 2005. He returned to the station, however, on 28 August 2005, on a freelance basis. He invariably read the news on Radio 4 over the Christmas period, often working long shifts.

Over the years he was involved in many disagreements with management. When the then Director-General Greg Dyke announced a plan to "cut the crap" from the BBC and sent plentiful publicity material to all members of staff, Donaldson threw his in the bin before writing to Dyke informing him that he had "..taken your [Dyke's] advice - and cut the crap". One morning in the 1970s he criticised the short-lived Radio 4 programme Up to the Hour on air, naming himself "Donald Peterson" and was nearly dismissed for doing so.

Donaldson stressed, in interviews, the importance in his view of "understanding and being interested in the material in front of you in order to involve the listener". He commented that there were some newsreaders (unspecified; but not within Radio 4) who "clearly have no understanding of what they are reading" and that thereby the quality of the broadcast suffered. Donaldson had a distinctive form of Received Pronunciation – one of the few left on British radio in the 21st century.

In the 1980s his voice was used on the pre-recorded warning that a nuclear attack had been launched on the British Isles during the Cold War, which would have been transmitted on television and radio from a studio in Broadcasting House in such an eventuality.

In 2000 he played the resentful and sarcastic butler Theremin, homicidal manservant to the celebrated occult investigator Lord Zimbabwe, in the BBC Radio 4 comedy Ectoplasm, and he also featured in a series of short Radio 4 programmes on the end of World War II reading news reports of the time. He appeared to remain at loggerheads with BBC management, and in 2006 it was reported that he would no longer read the news on Today, in opposition to the changes made by management to start that shift earlier and include an extra News Briefing programme. He retired on 31 December 2012, his last broadcast being the midnight news on New Year's Eve.

== Retirement and death ==
In retirement Donaldson lived in Pulborough, West Sussex, where his interests included gardening, current affairs, drama, walking, swimming and patronage of the White Horse (Pulborough) and Rising Sun (Nutbourne) pubs. Donaldson died on 2 November 2015, aged 70.

Donaldson is survived by his wife Aileen, whom he married in 1973, and their daughter, Emma, sons, Jamie and Bin, and grandson, Jack.

On his death BBC newsreader Corrie Corfield wrote: "He was a huge part of my life for over 27 years – a good friend, a superb broadcaster, a mentor, an ally, a rock, and the best boss I've ever had." BBC Radio 4 broadcaster Libby Purves said he had been an "icon" among staff for leading a revolt against BBC management in the 1970s. BBC Director-General Tony Hall described Donaldson as "the quintessential voice of the BBC".

== See also ==
- Wartime Broadcasting Service
