= Toploader =

English rock band

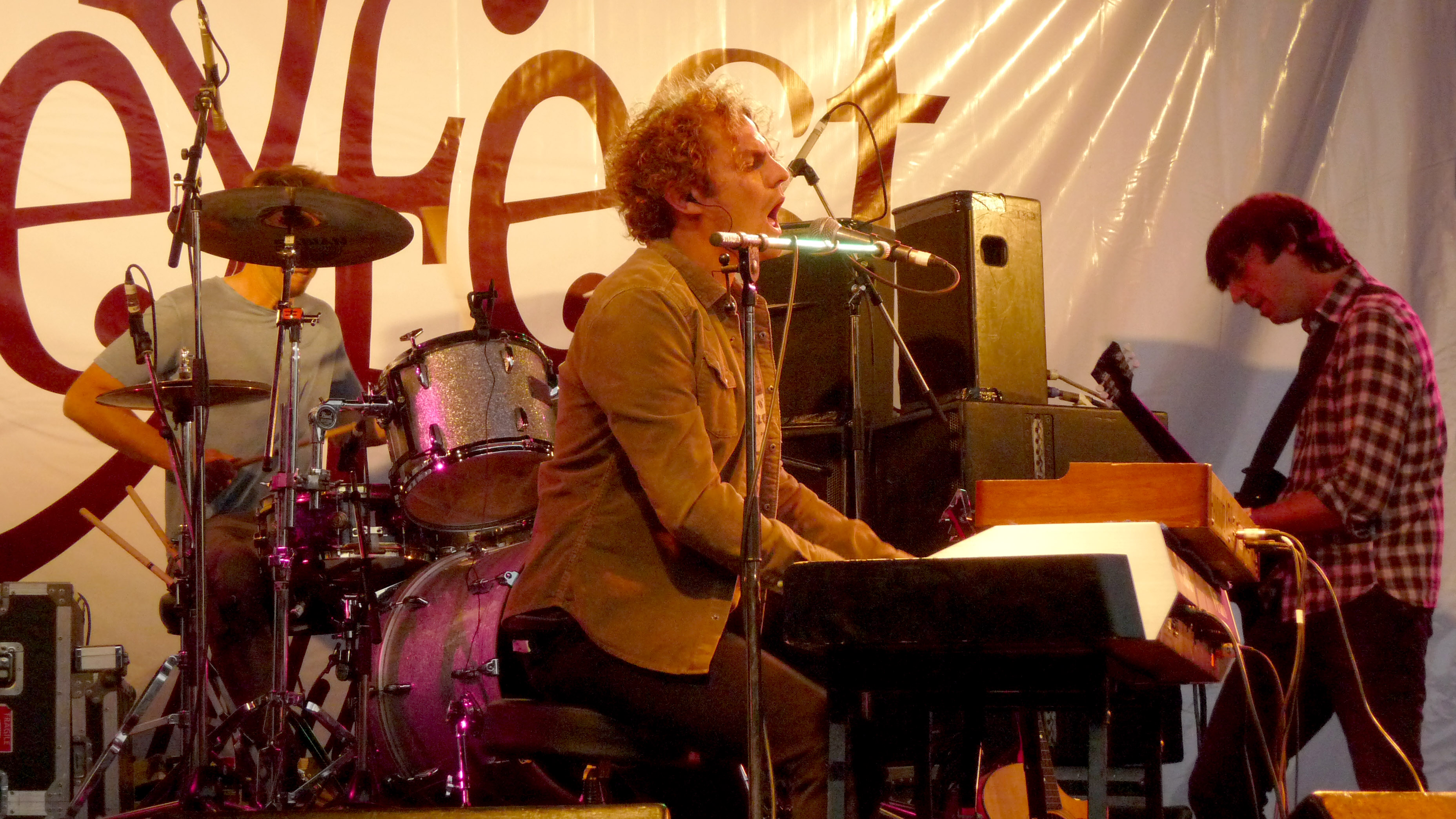
- Toploader performing in 2013

Background information
- Origin: Eastbourne, East Sussex, England
- Genres: Post-Britpop; alternative rock; indie rock; pop rock
- Years active: 1997–2003; 2009–present
- Labels: S2; Epic; Underdogs Music; Big Lake Music
- Members: Joseph Washbourn; Dan Hipgrave; Rob Green
- Past members: Matt Knight; Julian Deane
- Website: toploaderofficial.com

Toploader are an English rock band from Eastbourne, East Sussex, formed in 1997, with over two million album sales and several top-20 hits both home and abroad. Their debut album, Onka's Big Moka, sold over one million copies and peaked in the top five of the UK Albums Chart, where it remained for six months; it earned them four nominations at the 2001 Brit Awards. Their 2000 cover of Boffalongo's song "Dancing in the Moonlight" reached the top ten in the music charts in the United Kingdom and Ireland. Their second album, Magic Hotel, reached no. three on the UK Albums Chart. The band broke up in 2003, after the release of their second album, but they reformed in 2009.

== History ==
=== Beginnings (1997–1998) ===
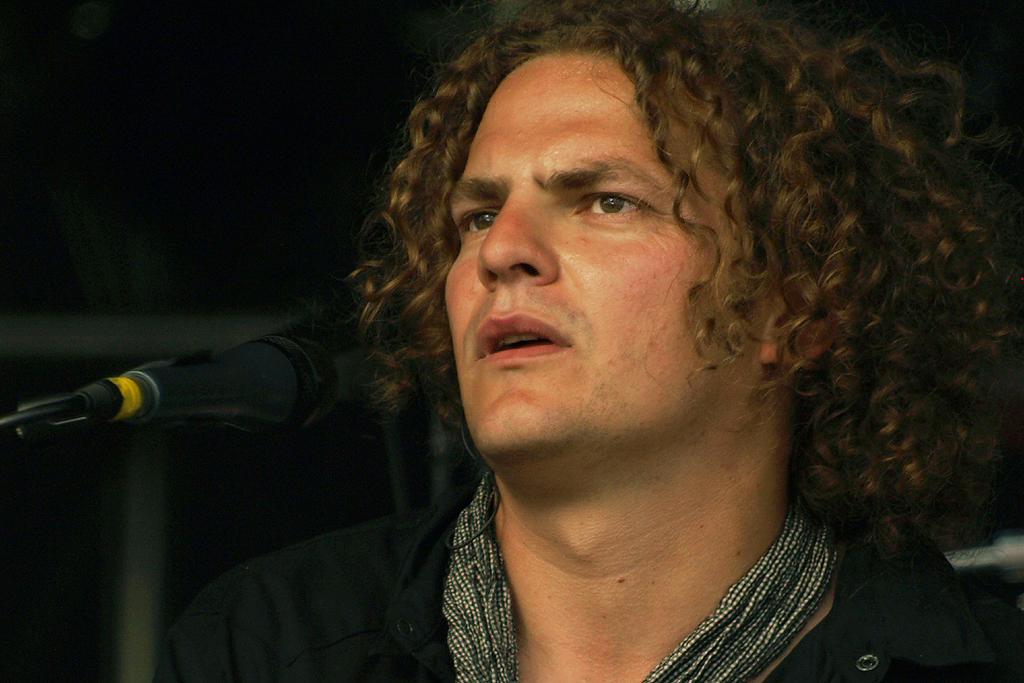
Joseph Washbourn

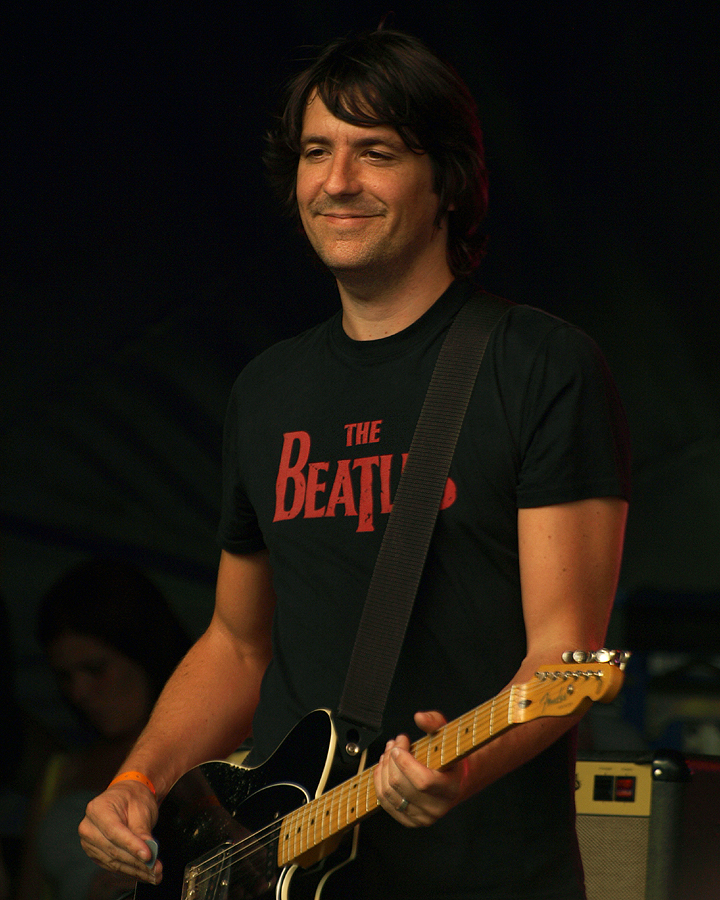
Dan Hipgrave

Named after a joint-rolling technique, Toploader's career began playing with Coldplay and Muse in small venues across the UK. They later went on to support the likes of Paul Weller, Noel Gallagher, Tom Jones, Robbie Williams, and Simple Minds. On 20 July 2000, they backed Bon Jovi at the original Wembley Stadium, becoming the last British band to play there before it was demolished and redeveloped.

=== Commercial success (1999–2001) ===
By 1998, Toploader had been picked up by S2 Records, a subsidiary of Sony Music, and signed a six-album deal. On 7 May 1999, the band made their first live TV performance on TFI Friday. On 22 May 2000, they released their debut album, Onka's Big Moka. It was produced by Dave Eringa, a longtime collaborator of the Manic Street Preachers. It debuted at number five in the UK Albums Chart and peaked at number four. "Dancing in the Moonlight" was the top single off the album, reaching number seven in the UK Singles Chart, while "Achilles Heel" reached number eight. The band received four nominations at the Brit Awards, though did not win any of them. On 24 June 2000, Toploader played at the Glastonbury Festival, as part of the Saturday lineup.

=== Breakup (2002–2003) ===
In 2002, the band released a second album, Magic Hotel. It was poorly received by critics and failed to match the success of the first. They experienced backlash from the UK music press, and their single "Time of My Life" fell short of expectations when it peaked at number 18 in the UK charts. Due to the negative reception and the album not meeting the same success as the first, the band was dropped by S2. Not long after that, they broke up, in 2003. Julian Deane retired as a musician and in 2007 founded Raygun Music, a Brighton-based management company that serves both as a record label and publisher.

=== Reforming and later work (2009–present) ===
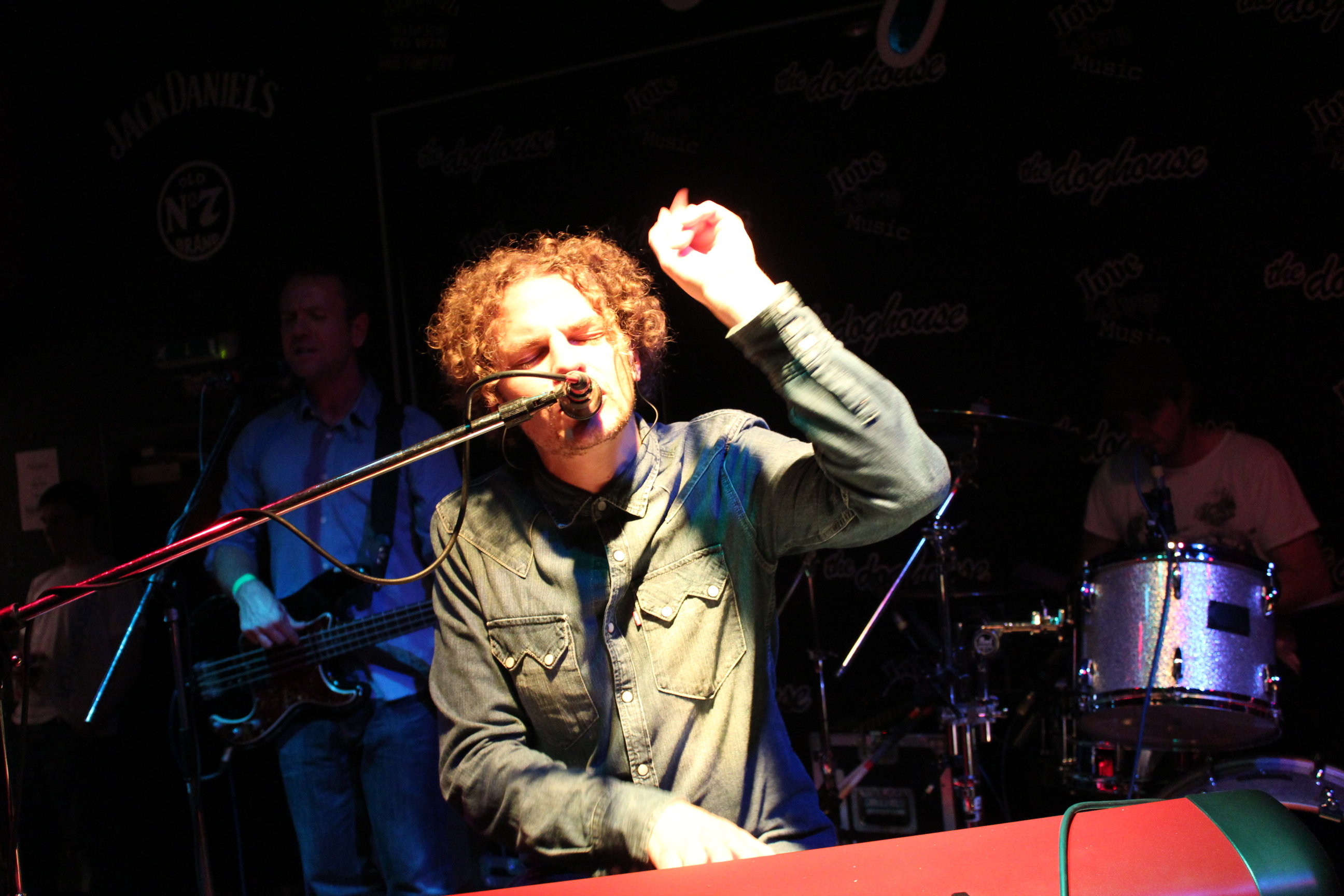
Toploader performing at the Doghouse in Dundee in 2011

In 2009, Toploader got back together in a lineup that consisted of three of its five original members: Joseph Washbourn, Dan Hipgrave, and Rob Green, with touring and session member Patrick Greenberg (a former touring-bassist with Clean Bandit). They signed a one-record deal with Underdogs Music and released Only Human in June 2011. The first single, "Never Stop Wondering", came out on 14 March 2011. Another single, "A Balance to All Things" (featuring a remix from Ash Howes), followed on 20 June 2011.

In May 2012, Toploader played at Lakefest festival, and in July, they appeared at the Tiree Music Festival in Scotland. During 2012, the band agreed to act as patrons for a UK-based children's charity called Time Is Precious.

In 2013, Toploader released a new single, "Turn It Around", co-written with Eg White, as part of a four-song EP of the same name. In 2013, they headlined the LeeStock Music Festival in Suffolk and the AmpRocks Festival in Bedfordshire.

On 12 May 2017, the band released their fourth album, Seeing Stars; "Roll with the Punches" was chosen as its lead single. The record was crowdfunded using an online direct-to-fan music platform called PledgeMusic.

Toploader appeared on Ant & Dec's Saturday Night Takeaway on 18 March 2023 as part of the "Sing-a-long Live" segment, where they performed "Dancing in the Moonlight". They also performed at the 2023 Conservative Party conference in Manchester on 3 October 2023 and the 2023 Labour Party Conference in Liverpool on 11 October.

From February to March 2025, Toploader joined James Blunt as the support act for his six-venue UK/Ireland tour, celebrating the 20th anniversary of his debut album, Back to Bedlam.

== Band members ==
Current

- Joseph Washbourn – lead vocals, keyboards, organ, piano, acoustic guitar (1997–2003, 2009–present)
- Dan Hipgrave – lead and rhythm guitars, backing vocals (1997–2003, 2009–present)
- Rob Green – drums, percussion (1997–2003, 2009–present)

Past

- Matt Knight – bass, backing vocals (1997–2003, 2009–2016)
- Julian Deane – rhythm and lead guitars, backing vocals (1997–2003)

Touring and session members

- Patrick Greenberg – bass, backing vocals (2016–present)

== Discography ==
=== Studio albums ===
List of studio albums, with selected chart positions and certifications
Title	Album details	Peak chart position								Sales	Certifications
Title	Album details	UK	AUS	DEN	GER	IRE	NLD	SCO	SWI	Sales	Certifications
Onka's Big Moka	Released: 22 May 2000; Label: S2; Format: CD, cassette, LP, digital download	4	99	36	43	6	86	3	85	UK: 1,200,000	BPI: 3× Platinum
Magic Hotel	Released: 19 August 2002; Label: S2; Format: CD, cassette, vinyl, digital download	3	—	—	—	36	—	3	—	UK: 60,000	BPI: Silver
Only Human	Released: 6 June 2011; Label: Underdogs Music; Format: CD, digital download	—	—	—	—	—	—	—	—		
Seeing Stars	Released: 12 May 2017; Label: Big Lake Music; Format: CD, digital download	—	—	—	—	—	—	—	—		
"—" denotes a recording that did not chart or was not released in that territory.

=== Compilations ===
Title	Album details
Dancing in the Moonlight – The Best of Toploader	Released: 9 March 2009; Label: Sony CMG; Formats: CD, digital download
Greatest Hits	Released: 3 September 2021; Label: Sony; Formats: digital download

=== EPs ===
Title	Album details
Toploader	Released: 1998; Label: Far Canal Records; Formats: CD
4 Hits	Released: 16 September 2011; Label: Sony; Formats: digital download
Turn It Around	Released: 12 February 2013; Label: Imagem UK; Formats: digital download

=== Singles ===
Title	Year	Peak chart positions										Certifications	Album
Title	Year	UK	AUS	BEL (FL)	BEL (WA)	GER	IRE	ITA	NLD	NZ	SWE	Certifications	Album
"Achilles Heel" (Note: "Achilles Heel" originally peaked at number 64 on the UK Singles chart, before being re-released in May 2000 and reaching a new peak chart position.)	1999	8	—	—	—	90	—	32	80	—	—		Onka's Big Moka
"Let the People Know"	2000	52	—	—	—	—	—	—	—	—	—		Onka's Big Moka
"Dancing in the Moonlight" (Note: "Dancing in the Moonlight" originally peaked at number 19 on the UK Singles chart, before being re-released in November 2000 and reaching a new peak chart position.)	2000	7	12	— (Note: "Dancing in the Moonlight" did not enter the Flanders Ultratop 50 but peaked at number 3 on the Ultratip chart.)	— (Note: "Dancing in the Moonlight" did not enter the Wallonia Ultratop 50 but peaked at number 10 on the Ultratip chart.)	15	7	21	52	24	44	BPI: 6× Platinum; ARIA: Gold; BVMI: Platinum; FIMI: Gold; RMNZ: 8× Platinum	Onka's Big Moka
"Just Hold On"	2000	20	—	—	—	—	—	—	—	—	—		Onka's Big Moka
"Only for a While"	2001	19	—	—	—	—	—	—	—	—	—		Onka's Big Moka
"Time of My Life"	2002	18	—	—	—	—	—	—	95	—	—		Magic Hotel
"Some Kind of Wonderful"	2002	76	—	—	—	—	—	—	—	—	—		Magic Hotel
"Never Stop Wondering"	2011	—	—	—	—	—	—	—	—	—	—		Only Human
"A Balance to All Things"	2011	—	—	— (Note: "A Balance to All Things" did not enter the Flanders Ultratop 50 but peaked at number 27 on the Ultratip chart.)	—	—	—	—	—	—	—		Only Human
"She Said"	2011	—	—	—	—	—	—	—	—	—	—		Only Human
"Turn It Around"	2013	—	—	—	—	—	—	—	—	—	—		Turn It Around
"This Is the Night"	2013	— (Note: "This Is the Night" did not enter the UK Singles Chart but peaked at number 41 on the UK Independent Singles Chart.)	—	—	—	—	—	—	—	—	—		Non-album single
"Roll with the Punches"	2017	—	—	—	—	—	—	—	—	—	—		Seeing Stars
"—" denotes a recording that did not chart or was not released in that territory.

== Awards and nominations ==
Brit Awards

Year	Nominee / work	Award	Result
2001	"Dancing in the Moonlight"	British Single of the Year	Nominated
2001	"Dancing in the Moonlight"	British Video of the Year	Nominated
2001	Toploader	British Group	Nominated
2001	Toploader	British Breakthrough Act	Nominated
