= Dancing in the Moonlight =

1970 single by Boffalongo

- Promotional 7-inch single

Single by Boffalongo

from the album Beyond Your Head
- B-side: "Endless Questions"
- Released: 1970
- Studio: J.T. Sound
- Length: 3:10
- Label: United Artists
- Songwriter: Sherman Kelly
- Producers: Eric & Steve Nathanson

Boffalongo singles chronology
"Please Stay" (1969)	"Dancing in the Moonlight" (1970)

"Dancing in the Moonlight" is a song written by Sherman Kelly and originally recorded in 1970 by Kelly's band Boffalongo. It was a hit single for King Harvest in 1972, reaching No. 5 in Canada and No. 13 in the United States. In 2000, a cover by English band Toploader became a worldwide hit and achieved multi-platinum status in the United Kingdom. Another cover by Swedish EDM duo Jubël, released in 2018, was also a hit in some European countries.

== History ==
Sherman Kelly wrote the song in 1969. While recovering from a brutal assault by a St. Croix gang, during which he was beaten with baseball bats and his girlfriend was gangraped, he "envisioned an alternate reality, the dream of a peaceful and joyful celebration of life". Kelly wrote:

On a trip to St. Croix in 1969, I was the first victim of a vicious St. Croix gang who eventually murdered 8 American tourists. At that time, I suffered multiple facial fractures and wounds and was left for dead. While I was recovering, I wrote "Dancin' in the Moonlight" in which I envisioned an alternate reality, the dream of a peaceful and joyful celebration of life. The song became a huge hit and was recorded by many musicians worldwide. "Dancin' In The Moonlight" continues to be popular to this day.

He recorded it singing lead with his band Boffalongo, and they were active from 1968 to 1971; they included it on their album Beyond Your Head and it was their final single. The song was also recorded by High Broom and released in 1970 on Island Records. It failed to reach the UK Singles Chart.

== King Harvest version ==
"Dancing in the Moonlight"

Single by King Harvest

from the album Dancing in the Moonlight
- B-side: "Lady, Come On Home"
- Released: 1972
- Genre: Soft rock; pop
- Length: 2:57
- Label: Perception
- Songwriter: Sherman Kelly
- Producers: Jack Robinson, Pierre Berjot

King Harvest singles chronology
"You and I" (1971)	"Dancing in the Moonlight" (1972)	"A Little Bit Like Magic" (1972)

Sherman Kelly's brother Wells Kelly introduced the song to the Paris-based band King Harvest in which he was drummer and where former Boffalongo member Dave "Doc" Robinson was lead vocalist, bassist, and keyboardist. King Harvest recorded and released "Dancing in the Moonlight", featuring a prominent keyboard countermelody, as a single with "Lady, Come On Home" on the B-side in 1972. The song was then featured on their album of the same name in 1973. Steve Cutler, a jazz drummer from New York City (standing on the base of the pole in the cover picture), played drums on the tracks and toured France and the UK with the band. The group disbanded after six months and the single languished for a year until it was bought and released worldwide by Perception Records. In Canada, the song reached number 5 on the weekly charts and number 71 on the year-end chart for 1973. It peaked at number 13 on the Billboard Hot 100 in the United States during the weeks of February 24 and March 3, 1973.

=== Charts ===
==== Weekly charts ====
Chart (1972–1973)	Peak position
Canada RPM Top Singles	5
Canada RPM Top AC	69
US Billboard Hot 100	13
US Billboard Easy Listening chart	22
US Cash Box Top 100	10

==== Year-end charts ====
Chart (1973)	Rank
Canada	71
US Billboard Hot 100	31

=== Certifications ===
Region	Certification	Certified units/sales
New Zealand (RMNZ)	Platinum	30,000^{‡}
^{‡} Sales+streaming figures based on certification alone.

== Toploader version ==
"Dancing in the Moonlight"

Single by Toploader

from the album Onka's Big Moka
- B-side: "Lucy"; "Jack"; "Man with a Plan"; "Times Like These"
- Released: February 21, 2000
- Length: 3:52; 3:30 (Stargate radio mix)
- Label: Sony Soho Square
- Songwriter: Sherman Kelly
- Producer: George Drakoulias

Toploader singles chronology
"Let the People Know" (1999)	"Dancing in the Moonlight" (2000)	"Achilles Heel" (2000)

Music video
- "Dancing in the Moonlight" on YouTube

In the year 2000, English band Toploader released a cover of "Dancing in the Moonlight". It was originally released on February 21, 2000, as the third single from their debut studio album, Onka's Big Moka (2000), and peaked at number 19 on the UK Singles Chart. It was then re-released in November of the same year with new production from Stargate and reached number seven on the same chart. The song has been certified 4× Platinum by the British Phonographic Industry (BPI) for sales and streams of over 2,400,000 units. Worldwide, the song reached the top 20 in Australia, Germany, Ireland, the Netherlands, Norway, and Spain. At the Danish Music Awards of 2001, the song was nominated for Foreign Hit of the Year.

=== Track listings ===
UK CD single (Feb. 2000)

1. "Dancing in the Moonlight" – 3:52
2. "Lucy" – 2:55
3. "Jack" – 3:34

UK 7-inch single (Feb. 2000)

A1. "Dancing in the Moonlight" – 3:52
B1. "Man with a Plan" – 3:41
B2. "Times Like These" – 4:52

UK cassette single (Feb. 2000); European CD single (2000)

1. "Dancing in the Moonlight" – 3:52
2. "Lucy" – 2:55

UK CD single (Nov. 2000); Australian CD single

1. "Dancing in the Moonlight" – 3:52
2. "Dancing in the Moonlight" (Stargate radio mix) – 3:30
3. "Dancing in the Moonlight" (Alliance DC vocal remix) – 6:30
4. "Dancing in the Moonlight" (live) – 4:31

UK cassette single (Nov. 2000); European CD single (2001)

1. "Dancing in the Moonlight" – 3:52
2. "Dancing in the Moonlight" (Stargate radio mix) – 3:30

=== Charts ===
==== Weekly charts ====
Chart (2000–2022)	Peak position
Australia (ARIA)	12
Belgium (Ultratip Bubbling Under Flanders)	3
Belgium (Ultratip Bubbling Under Wallonia)	10
Europe (Eurochart Hot 100)	35
Germany (GfK)	15
Hungary (Single Top 40)	35
Ireland (IRMA)	7
Italy (FIMI)	21
Netherlands (Dutch Top 40)	16
Netherlands (Single Top 100)	52
New Zealand (Recorded Music NZ)	24
Norway (VG-lista)	11
Poland Airplay (Music & Media)	1
Scottish Singles Sales (Official Charts)	14
Spain (Promusicae)	7
Sweden (Sverigetopplistan)	44
Switzerland (Schweizer Hitparade)	53
UK Singles (Official Charts)	7

==== Year-end charts ====
Chart (2000)	Position
Denmark (Danish Airplay Chart)	2
Germany (Media Control)	84
UK Singles (OCC)	155

Chart (2001)	Position
Australia (ARIA)	70
Ireland (IRMA)	59
UK Singles (OCC)	49

=== Certifications ===
Region	Certification	Certified units/sales
Australia (ARIA)	Gold	35,000^{^}
Denmark (IFPI Danmark)	2× Platinum	180,000^{‡}
Germany (BVMI)	Platinum	500,000^{‡}
Italy (FIMI)	Platinum	100,000^{‡}
New Zealand (RMNZ)	8× Platinum	240,000^{‡}
Spain (Promusicae)	Platinum	60,000^{‡}
United Kingdom (BPI)	6× Platinum	3,600,000^{‡}
^{^} Shipments figures based on certification alone.^{‡} Sales+streaming figures based on certification alone.

=== Release history ===
Region	Date	Format(s)	Label(s)	Ref(s).
United Kingdom	February 21, 2000	7-inch vinyl; CD; cassette	Sony Soho Square	
United Kingdom (re-release)	November 13, 2000	CD; cassette	Sony Soho Square	
Australia	April 16, 2001	CD	Sony Music	

== Jubël version ==
"Dancing in the Moonlight"

Single by Jubël featuring Neimy

from the album Strawtown
- Released: June 22, 2018
- Recorded: 2018
- Length: 2:44
- Label: Good Soldier
- Songwriter: Sherman Kelly
- Producer: Jubël

Jubël singles chronology
"Illusion" (2017)	"Dancing in the Moonlight" (2018)	"On the Beach" (2019)

Neimy singles chronology
"Dancing in the Moonlight" (2018)	"Unforgettable" (2018)

Music video
- "Dancing in the Moonlight" on YouTube

Swedish record producer duo Jubël released a dance cover in 2018 featuring Neimy. It peaked at number 9 on Sverigetopplistan, the official Swedish Singles Chart. It also charted in Belgium's Ultratip Bubbling Under chart in both Flanders and Wallon francophone markets.

The song garnered the attention of British radio DJs in 2020 and as a result the Jubël version gained more popularity two years after its initial release in Sweden. The song was rereleased for the British market giving it a much bigger international audience. It peaked at number 11 on the UK Singles Chart, and the Irish and Scottish singles charts as well. The song was used in series 6 of the reality show Love Island in 2020 and spread to TikTok, while reaching the top of the British radio list. The song also charted on the ARIA Australian Official Singles Chart, also in 2020.

=== Releases ===
- 2018: "Dancing in the Moonlight" (2:44)
- 2019: "Dancing in the Moonlight" (PBH & Jack Sunset Remix Radio Edit) (2:16)
- 2019: "Dancing in the Moonlight" (Jack Wins Remix) (2:40)
- 2020: "Dancing in the Moonlight" (Nathan Dawe Remix) (2:51)

=== Charts ===
Chart (2018–2021)	Peak position
Australia (ARIA)	23
Belgium (Ultratip Bubbling Under Flanders)	46
Belgium (Ultratip Bubbling Under Wallonia)	19
Canada Hot 100 (Billboard)	97
Czech Republic Airplay (ČNS IFPI)	10
France (SNEP)	128
Iceland (Tónlistinn)	17
Ireland (IRMA)	36
Portugal (AFP)	128
Scottish Singles Sales (Official Charts)	3
Slovakia Airplay (ČNS IFPI)	8
Slovenia (SloTop50)	13
Sweden (Sverigetopplistan)	9
UK Singles (Official Charts)	11

=== Certifications ===
Region	Certification	Certified units/sales
Austria (IFPI Austria)	Gold	15,000^{‡}
Canada (Music Canada)	2× Platinum	160,000^{‡}
Denmark (IFPI Danmark)	Platinum	90,000^{‡}
France (SNEP)	Gold	100,000^{‡}
Italy (FIMI)	Platinum	100,000^{‡}
New Zealand (RMNZ)	2× Platinum	60,000^{‡}
Norway (IFPI Norway)	Gold	30,000^{‡}
Poland (ZPAV)	Gold	25,000^{‡}
Portugal (AFP)	Platinum	10,000^{‡}
Spain (Promusicae)	Platinum	60,000^{‡}
United Kingdom (BPI)	Platinum	600,000^{‡}
Streaming
Sweden (GLF)	Platinum	8,000,000^{†}
^{‡} Sales+streaming figures based on certification alone.^{†} Streaming-only figures based on certification alone.

== Other versions ==
- In 1994, a version by Bahamian group the Baha Men from their album Kalik reached No. 18 in New Zealand and No. 42 in Canada.
- In 1999, The CrownSayers recorded a version for the soundtrack of the film Big Daddy.
- In 2000, actor Ted Raimi covered the song in the Xena: Warrior Princess musical episode Lyre, Lyre, Hearts on Fire.
- Actor and musician Jack Wagner covered the song on his 2005 release Dancing in the Moonlight.
- In 2009, American actor and singer Alyson Stoner covered the song. Scenes from the film Space Buddies appear in the music video for this version; the music video is a special feature on the DVD release of the film.
- In 2021, a cover of the song was featured during the end credits of Muppets Haunted Mansion, performed by the Muppet band Dr. Teeth and the Electric Mayhem.
- In 2022, American country singers Chris Lane and Lauren Alaina released a rewritten version as a duet, incorporating country music elements in both the lyrics and instrumentation to change the genre of the song. This version differs enough from the original that it has been called more an homage than a cover.
- In 2023, American indie pop band Cannons covered the song for their album Heartbeat Highway.

== See also ==
- List of 1970s one-hit wonders in the United States
