= BBC Radio 4 =

British national radio station

- Logo used since 2022
- London (Note: Radio 4 also broadcasts some live and recorded programmes from Belfast, Birmingham, Bristol, Cardiff, Glasgow and Salford.); United Kingdom
- Frequencies: FM: 92.5–96.1 MHz, 103.5–104.9 MHz; DAB: 12B; Freesat: 704; Freeview: 704; Sky (UK only): 0104; Virgin Media: 904; Virgin Media Ireland: 910
- RDS: BBC R4

Programming
- Language: English
- Format: News, talk, comedy and drama

Ownership
- Owner: BBC
- Sister stations: BBC Radio 4 Extra

History
- First air date: 30 September 1967; 59 years ago (as BBC Radio 4); 9 March 1930; 96 years ago (as BBC National and Regional Programme) (Note: Radio 4 was established to replace BBC Home Service, which itself replaced BBC National Programme. The latter of these first broadcast in 1930. The BBC has had a broadcast since it acquired BBC Regional Programme in 1930.)
- Former call signs: BBC National Programme (1930–1939); BBC Regional Programme (1930–1939); BBC Home Service (1939–1967)
- Former names: BBC National Programme/BBC Regional Programme (1930–1939); BBC Home Service (1939–1967); BBC Radio 4 UK (1978–1984)
- Former frequencies: 693, 909 & 1053 MW (England) (1967-1978); 810 MW (Scotland) (1967-1978); 882 MW (Wales) (1967-1978); 603-1485 MW (England) (1978-2024); 198 LW (1978-2026)

Technical information
- Licensing authority: Ofcom

Links
- Website: BBC Radio 4 via BBC Sounds

BBC Radio 4 is a British national radio station owned and operated by the BBC. It launched on 30 September 1967 as a replacement for the BBC Home Service and broadcasts a wide variety of spoken-word programmes from the BBC's headquarters at Broadcasting House in London. Since 2019, the station controller has been Mohit Bakaya. He replaced Gwyneth Williams, who had been the station controller since 2010.

Radio 4 is broadcast throughout the United Kingdom, the Isle of Man and the Channel Islands on FM, DAB and BBC Sounds, it can also be received in the eastern counties of Ireland, northern France and Northern Europe. It is available internationally via the BBC.com website and app. It currently reaches over 9.2 million listeners, making it the UK's second most-popular radio station after BBC Radio 2. Radio 4 was previously broadcast on long wave on 198 kHz, from 23 November 1978 until 27 June 2026.

BBC Radio 4 broadcasts news programmes such as Today, The World at One, PM, and The Westminster Hour heralded on air by the Greenwich Time Signal pips or the chimes of Big Ben, which are broadcast live. (Note: The pips are only accurate on FM; there is a delay on digital radio of three to five seconds, and online up to 23 seconds.) Radio 4 also broadcasts the Shipping Forecast, which is over 150 years old.

According to RAJAR, the station (inc.4 Extra) broadcasts to an audience of 9.54 million with a listening share of 16% as of March 2026.

== Overview ==
BBC Radio 4 broadcasts a wide variety of speech-related programming, including news, drama, features, comedy, science and history. Music is broadcast as in documentaries relating to various forms of both popular and classical music, and the long-running music-based Desert Island Discs. Sport is not part of the station's output, apart from during news bulletins, although between 1994 and 2023, the station's long wave frequency was used to broadcast ball-by-ball commentaries of most Test cricket matches played by England. Consequently, for around 70 days a year, listeners had to rely on FM broadcasts or DAB for mainstream Radio 4 broadcasts – the number relying solely on long wave was now a small minority. The cricket broadcasts took precedence over on-the-hour news bulletins, but not the Shipping Forecast, carried since Radio 4's move to long wave in 1978 because long wave can be received clearly at sea.

The station is available on FM in most of Great Britain, parts of Ireland and the north of France; LW throughout the UK and in parts of Northern Europe, and the Atlantic north of the Azores to about 20 degrees west; DAB; Digital TV including Freeview, Freesat, Freely, Sky and Virgin Media, and on the Internet. Freesat, Sky and Virgin formerly had a separate channel for Radio 4 LW output in mono, in addition to the FM output, but these were removed after the separate schedule for LW ended in April 2024. BBC Radio 4 broadcast from 5am to 1am on weekdays, and 5:30am to 1am on the weekends

BBC Radio 4 is the second-most-popular British domestic radio station by total hours, after Radio 2. It recorded its highest audience, of 11 million listeners, in May 2011, and was "UK Radio Station of the Year" at the 2003, 2004, 2008 and 2023 Radio Academy Awards. It also won a Peabody Award in 2002 for File on 4: Export Controls. Costing £87 million (2024/5), it is the BBC's most expensive national radio network. There is no comparable British commercial network: Channel 4 abandoned plans to launch its own speech-based digital radio station in October 2008 as part of a £100m cost-cutting review.

The long wave signal was part of the Royal Navy's system of letters of last resort. In the event of a suspected catastrophic attack on Britain, submarine captains, in addition to other checks, check for a broadcast signal from Radio 4 on 198 kHz long wave to verify the destruction of organised society in the United Kingdom.

== History ==
Logo of BBC Radio 4 until 2007

Logo of BBC Radio 4 used from 2007 until 2022

Initially the power was 100 watts on 350 metres (857 kHz). 2LO was allowed to transmit for seven minutes, after which the "operator" had to listen on the wavelength for three minutes for possible instructions to close down. On 14 November 1922, the station was transferred to the new British Broadcasting Company, which in 1923 took up the nearby Savoy Hill for its broadcasting studios. At midnight on New Year's Eve 1923, the twelve chimes of Big Ben were broadcast for the first time to mark the new year. The British Broadcasting Company began transmissions in London on 14 November 1922, from station 2LO in the Strand, which it had inherited from the Marconi Company (one of six commercial companies which created the BBC), but technology did not yet exist either for national coverage or joint programming between transmitters. While it was possible to combine large numbers of trunk telephone lines to link transmitters for individual programmes, the process was expensive and not encouraged by the General Post Office as it tied up large parts of the telephone network. The stations that followed the establishment of 2LO in London were therefore autonomously programmed using local talent and facilities.

By May 1923, simultaneous broadcasting was technically possible at least between main transmitters and relay stations, the quality was not felt to be high enough to provide a national service or regular simultaneous broadcasts. In 1924, it was felt that technical standards had improved enough for London to start to provide the majority of the output, cutting the local stations back to providing items of local interest.

The company became the British Broadcasting Corporation in 1927. On 9 March 1930, 2LO was replaced by the BBC Regional Programme and the BBC National Programme. The letters LO continued to be used internally as a designation in the BBC for technical operations in the London area (for example, the numbering of all recordings made in London contained LO). The code LO was changed to LN in the early 1970s.

=== Main stations ===
Each of these main stations were broadcast at approximately 1 kW:

Airdate	Station ID	City	Initial frequency
14 November 1922	2LO	London	822 kHz
15 November 1922	5IT	Birmingham	626 kHz
15 November 1922	2ZY	Manchester	794 kHz
24 December 1922	5NO	Newcastle upon Tyne	743 kHz
13 February 1923	5WA	Cardiff	850 kHz
6 March 1923	5SC	Glasgow	711 kHz
10 October 1923	2BD	Aberdeen	606 kHz
17 October 1923	6BM	Bournemouth	777 kHz
14 September 1924	2BE	Belfast	689 kHz

==== Relay stations ====
Each of these relay stations were broadcast at approximately 120 watts (W):

Airdate	Station ID	City	Relay of	Frequency
16 November 1923	6FL	Sheffield	2ZY	980 kHz
28 March 1924	5PY	Plymouth	6BM	887 kHz
1 May 1924	2EH	Edinburgh	5SC	914 kHz
11 June 1924	6LV	Liverpool	2ZY	906 kHz
8 July 1924	2LS	Leeds and Bradford	2ZY	935 kHz
15 August 1924	6KH	Kingston upon Hull	2ZY	896 kHz
16 September 1924	5NG	Nottingham	2ZY	920 kHz
21 October 1924	6ST	Stoke-on-Trent	2ZY	996 kHz
12 November 1924	2DE	Dundee	2BD	952 kHz
12 December 1924	5SX	Swansea	5WA	622 kHz

The BBC Home Service was the predecessor of Radio 4 and broadcast between 1939 and 1967. It had regional variations and was broadcast on medium wave with a network of VHF FM transmitters being added from 1955. Radio 4 replaced it on 30 September 1967, when the BBC restructured and renamed its domestic radio stations, in response to the challenge of offshore radio. It moved to long wave in November 1978, taking over the 200 kHz frequency (1,500 metres) previously held by Radio 2 - later moved to 198 kHz as a result of international agreements aimed at avoiding interference (all ITU Region 1 MW/LW broadcast frequencies are divisible by 9). At this point, Radio 4 became available across all of the UK for the first time and the station officially became known as Radio 4 UK, a title that remained until 29 September 1984.

For a time during the 1970s, Radio 4 carried regional news bulletins Monday to Saturday. These were broadcast twice at breakfast, at lunchtime and at 17:55. There were also programme variations for the parts of England not served by BBC Local Radio stations. These included Roundabout East Anglia, a VHF opt-out of the Today programme broadcast from BBC East's studios in Norwich each weekday from 06:45{ to 08:45. Roundabout East Anglia came to an end in August 1980, ahead of the launch of BBC Radio Norfolk.

All regional news bulletins broadcast from BBC regional news bases around England ended in August 1980, apart from in the southwest as until January 1983 there was no BBC Local Radio in the southwest so these news bulletins and its weekday morning regional programme, Morning Sou'West, continued to be broadcast from the BBC studios in Plymouth on VHF and on the Radio 4 medium wave Plymouth relay until 31 December 1982.

The launch of Radio 5 on 27 August 1990 saw the removal of Open University, schools programming, children's programmes and the Study on 4/Options adult education slot from Radio 4's FM frequencies. Consequently, the full Radio 4 schedule became available on FM for the first time. However, adult educational and Open University programming returned to Radio 4 in 1994, when Radio 5 was closed to make way for the launch of BBC Radio 5 Live and were broadcast until the end of the 1990s, on Sunday evenings on long wave only.

Between 17 January 1991 and 2 March 1991, FM broadcasts were replaced by a continuous news service devoted to the Gulf War, Radio 4 News FM, with the main Radio 4 service transferring to long wave. Before this, Radio 4's FM frequencies had occasionally been used for additional news coverage, generally for live coverage of statements and debates in Parliament.

By the start of the 1990s, Radio 4 had become available on FM in most of the UK - previously FM coverage had been restricted mainly to England and south Wales. This meant that it was possible for the main Radio 4 service to be transferred from LW to FM, and this took place on 16 September 1991 with opt-outs - extra shipping forecasts, Daily Service, Yesterday in Parliament coverage of Prime Ministers Questions and other occasional extra news coverage, joined in 1994 by Test Match Special - transferring to long wave. However, 1994 did see the end of the extra news coverage on long wave due to the launch of BBC Radio 5 Live, although occasional broadcasts of services continued with the last being when Pope Benedict XVI visited Britain in 2010.

On 15 April 2024 at 12:27 BST, Radio 4's medium wave frequencies were switched off. These previously served as relays in areas with a weak long wave signal to provide reception of Radio 4 long wave, such as Northern Ireland and south west England. A continuous closedown loop message was broadcast until 30 April 2024, informing listeners to retune to other methods of reception.

On 30 May 2023, the BBC announced that Radio 4 will stop broadcasting opt-outs on long wave with the last opt-outs airing on 31 March 2024. The two displaced programmes, Daily Service and Yesterday in Parliament moved to BBC Radio 4 Extra, although the latter was returned to the early morning Radio 4 schedule in April 2025. The daily amount of Shipping Forecasts was reduced to be broadcast 2 times on weekdays and 3 times on weekends. Test Match Special moved to BBC Radio 5 Sports Extra on 31 July 2023. These end ahead of a planned switch-off of long wave transmissions by 26 September 2026. On 11 May 2026, the BBC announced that Radio 4 long wave transmission would be switched-off earlier than previously publicised, on 27 June 2026. At 01:00 BST, the long wave transmitters were switched off as planned, and a retune loop began playing on 198 kHz, and is expected to continue doing so until its permanent switch-off on 30 June 2026.

== Programmes and schedules ==
=== Daily schedule ===
As of April 2025, Radio 4 is on air from 05:00 to 01:00 every Monday to Friday, and 05:30 to 01:00 every Saturday and Sunday. The station simulcasts the BBC World Service during its downtime overnight including Newsday (Radio). An online schedule page lists the running order of programmes.

=== Production ===
The station broadcasts a mix of live and pre-recorded programmes. Live programming includes breakfast programme Today, magazine programme Woman's Hour, consumer affairs programme You and Yours, and (often) the music, film, books, arts and culture programme Front Row. Continuity is managed from Broadcasting House with news bulletins, including the hourly summaries and longer programmes such as the Six O'Clock News and Midnight News, and news programmes such as Today, The World at One and PM, which by early 2013 had returned to Broadcasting House after 15 years at BBC Television Centre in White City. The news returning to Broadcasting House has also meant that newsreaders can provide cover for continuity, which regularly occurs at 23:00 each night and 16:00 on a Sunday. This has reduced the total number of continuity announcers required each day down from four to three.

The Greenwich Time Signal, popularly known as "the pips", is broadcast virtually every hour to herald the news bulletin, except at midnight and 18:00, and 22:00 on Sunday, when the chimes of Big Ben are played. There is no Greenwich Time Signal at 15:00 on Saturday or 11:00 and 12:00 on Sunday due to the Saturday Afternoon drama and the omnibus edition of The Archers respectively. Only pips broadcast on FM and LW are accurate. On digital platforms there is a delay of between three and five seconds, and up to 23 seconds online.

=== Programmes ===
Radio 4 programmes cover a wide variety of genre including news and current affairs, history, culture, science, religion, arts, comedy, features, drama and entertainment. A number of the programmes on Radio 4 take the form of a "magazine" show, featuring numerous small contributions over the course of the programme—Woman's Hour, From Our Own Correspondent, You and Yours. The rise of these magazine shows is primarily due to the work of Tony Whitby, controller of Radio 4 from 1970 to 1975. The station hosts a number of long-running programmes, many of which have been broadcast for over 40 years.

Most programmes are available to UK listeners for 30 days or over a year after broadcast as streaming audio from Radio 4's Listen again page and via BBC Sounds. (A selection of programmes is also available as podcasts or downloadable audio files.)

The Listen again page is essential for overseas listeners in different time zones as it enables them to hear programmes at a reasonable hour. In July 2025, the BBC blocked its non-UK audience (approximately 300,000 listeners) from using Listen again. In response to listeners’ complaints, the BBC reversed itself the following month. On 7 August, it was announced on Radio 4’s Feedback that Listen again (aka ‘On demand’) would be restored for its overseas Radio 4 and World Service listeners.But as of January 2026, the BBC provides Listen again to overseas listeners for fewer than half its Radio 4 programmes.

Many comedy and drama programmes from the Radio 4 archives are broadcast on BBC Radio 4 Extra. Due to the capacity limitations of DAB and increasing sport broadcasts on BBC Radio 5 Sports Extra, BBC Radio 4 DAB has to reduce its bit rate most evenings, such that after 19:00 its DAB output is usually in mono, even though many of its programmes are made in stereo (including its flagship drama "The Archers"), these can be heard in stereo only on FM, Digital TV on Freeview & Freesat (Ch. 704), Sky, Virgin and on line via BBC Sounds. BBC World Service, which uses BBC Radio 4 FM & DAB frequencies between 01:00 and 05:20, is in stereo, but only on Radio 4 FM & DAB and not on its own dedicated DAB channel. BBC Radio 4 Extra broadcasts in mono on DAB, but has always been in stereo on Digital TV (Freeview / Freesat Ch 708), Sky, Virgin and online.

== Notable continuity announcers and newsreaders ==
Announcers carry out the following duties from Broadcasting House:

- Provide links (or junctions) between programmes
- Read trails for programmes
- Provide reassurance to listeners during a programme breakdown
- Read the Shipping Forecast
- Read the BBC Radio 3 news summaries at 13:00 and 18:00 on weekdays, and 07:00, 08:00 and 13:00 on Saturdays.

Newsreaders read hourly summaries and longer bulletins from New Broadcasting House. In 2012 the BBC announced that it would be reducing its main presentation team from 12 to ten.

=== BBC ===
- Viji Alles
- Ron Brown
- Lisa Costello
- John Hammond
- Amanda Litherland
- Caroline Nicholls
- Tom Sandars
- Alan Smith
- Jane Steel

=== Freelance ===
- Chris Aldridge
- Kelsey Bennett
- Charles Carroll
- Richard Evans
- Arlene Fleming
- Danielle Jalowiecka
- Joanna Kean
- Jim Lee
- Neil Nunes
- Andrew Peach
- Tina Ritchie
- Al Ryan

=== Former ===
- Alice Arnold (1994–2012; now with Mellow Magic)
- Carolyn Brown (left 2015)
- Harriet Cass (left 2013)
- Corrie Corfield (1988–2021)
- Peter Donaldson (1973–2012)
- Mark Forrest (2018–2025)
- Charlotte Green (1988–2013)
- Peter Jefferson (left 2009)
- Astley Jones (left 2006)
- Laurie Macmillan (died 2001)
- Rory Morrison (died 2013)
- Charles Nove (left 2019; now with Scala Radio)
- Jamie Owen
- Brian Perkins
- Iain Purdon (retired from BBC World Service in 2016)
- Susan Rae (left 2021)
- Vaughan Savidge (left 2018)
- Neil Sleat (1998–2021)
- Zeb Soanes (left 2022; now with Classic FM)
- Moira Stuart (left 1981 to move to TV; now with Classic FM)

== Frequencies and other means of reception ==
Radio 4 is broadcast on:
Broadcast type	Frequency
FM	92–95 MHz FM in England; 94.6–96.1 and 103.5–104.9 MHz in Scotland; 92.8-95.5 and 103.5-104.9 MHz in Wales; 93.2–96.0 and 103.5–104.6 MHz in Northern Ireland
DAB	12B multiplex (BBC National DAB)
Terrestrial television	Freeview channel 704
Satellite television	Freesat channel 704; Sky channel 0104
Cable television	Virgin Media channel 904; Virgin Media Ireland channel 910 in Republic of Ireland
Internet	BBC Sounds live streaming (UK Only); BBC.com and the BBC Mobile App (internationally)

=== Former frequencies ===
Broadcast type	Recent frequencies	Switch off date
Medium wave	603 kHz in Newcastle upon Tyne; 720 kHz in London, Derry and Belfast; 756 kHz in Redruth; 774 kHz in Plymouth and Enniskillen; 1449 kHz in Aberdeen; 1485 kHz in Carlisle	15 April 2024
Medium wave	1088 kHz; 1151 kHz; 1457 kHz	1973
Medium wave	1340 kHz (Northern Ireland)	1975
Medium wave	692 kHz; 809 kHz (Scotland); 881 kHz (Wales); 908 kHz; 1052 kHz	1978
Long wave	200 kHz (changed to 198 kHz)	1988
Long wave	198 kHz (Droitwich, Burghead and Westerglen)	27 June 2026

== Criticisms ==
Criticism voiced by centre-right newspapers in recent years have a perceived left political bias across a range of issues, as well as sycophancy in interviews, particularly on the popular morning news magazine Today as part of a reported perception of a general "malaise" at the BBC. Conversely, the journalist Mehdi Hasan has criticised the station for an overtly "socially and culturally conservative" approach.

There has been criticism of Today in particular for a lack of female broadcasters. In September 1972, Radio 4 employed the first female continuity announcers—Hylda Bamber and Barbara Edwards. For quite some time, the introduction of female newsreaders led to complaints from listeners; women discussing topics of feminist interest led to similar complaints. In addition, there has been long-running criticism by atheist and humanist groups of Thought for the Day, a slot dedicated exclusively to religious discussion during Radio 4's flagship morning news programme.

Radio 4 has been criticised for being "too middle class" and of "little interest" to non-white listeners.

== See also ==
- ABC Radio National
- CBC Radio One - Canadian talk radio station from CBC
- List of former BBC newsreaders and reporters
- List of current BBC newsreaders and reporters
- National Public Radio
- Radio New Zealand National
- RTÉ Radio 1 - Irish talk and music radio station from RTÉ
- Sveriges Radio P1
