= Flo =

Flo or FLO may refer to:

== People ==
- Flo (name), a list of people with the name Flo
- Flo, nickname of LB1, a Homo floresiensis fossil

== Places ==
- Flo, Norway, a village near Stryn, Vestland
- Flo, Sweden, a historic parish near Grästorp, Västergötland
- Flo, Texas, an unincorporated community in Leon County, Texas, United States

== Arts and entertainment ==
=== Film and television ===
- Flo (TV series), an American TV sitcom
- FLO TV, an American mobile television service

=== Fictional characters ===
- Flo (Progressive Insurance), in commercials for the American insurance company Progressive
- Florence Jean Castleberry, or Flo, first introduced in the 1974 film Alice Doesn't Live Here Anymore
- Flo, title character of the comic strip Flo & Friends
- Flo, a humbug damselfish from the Finding Nemo franchise
- Flo (Cars), a character from the Cars franchise
- Flo, a character from the video game Diner Dash and its franchise.
- The Flo, companions of Tina and Milo, the mascots of the 2026 Winter Olympics and 2026 Winter Paralympics

=== Music ===
- Flo (group), a British girl group
- "Flo", a 2000 song by Smash Mouth from the album Fush Yu Mang
- "Flo", a 1989 song by Pierre Bachelet from the album Quelque part... c'est toujours ailleurs

== Other uses ==
- Flo (app), a menstruation, ovulation and pregnancy monitoring mobile application
- FLO charging network a Quebec-based electric vehicle charging network
- Flo (chimpanzee), a member of the Kasakela chimpanzee community
- FLO (retailer), a chain of footwear stores based in Turkey

== Acronyms and codes ==
- Florence Regional Airport (IATA code FLO), South Carolina, U.S.
- Florence station (South Carolina), U.S.; station code FLO
- Fairtrade International, or Fairtrade Labelling Organizations International e.V. (FLO)
- Flowers Foods (New York Stock Exchange symbol FLO)
- Family Liaison Officer, a role in the British police

== See also ==
- Flo & Eddie, a musical pop duo
- Florian (disambiguation)
- Florence (disambiguation)
- Flow (disambiguation)
- Flou (disambiguation)
- Floh (disambiguation)
- Floe (disambiguation)
