= Flou (disambiguation) =

Flou is a Paraguayan rock band. It may also refer to:

- "Flou" (song), a 2019 single by Angèle
- Flou, a 1978 album by Pavlos Sidiropoulos
- Flou, a furniture maker founded in 1978 by Rosario Messina

== See also ==
- Phlou language
- Flo (disambiguation)
- Floe (disambiguation)
- Floh (disambiguation)
- Flow (disambiguation)
