= Leeuwenhoek (disambiguation) =

Antonie van Leeuwenhoek was a Dutch businessman and scientist in the Golden Age of Dutch science and technology.

Leeuwenhoek may also refer to:

- Leeuwenhoek (crater), a lunar impact crater
- Leeuwenhoek Lecture, a prize lecture of the Royal Society
- Leeuwenhoek Medal, an award of the Royal Netherlands Academy of Arts and Sciences

== See also ==
- Antonie van Leeuwenhoek (journal), a microbiology journal
