= Messina Palace =

Historical landmark

Coordinates: 35°53′58.7″N 14°30′53.8″E

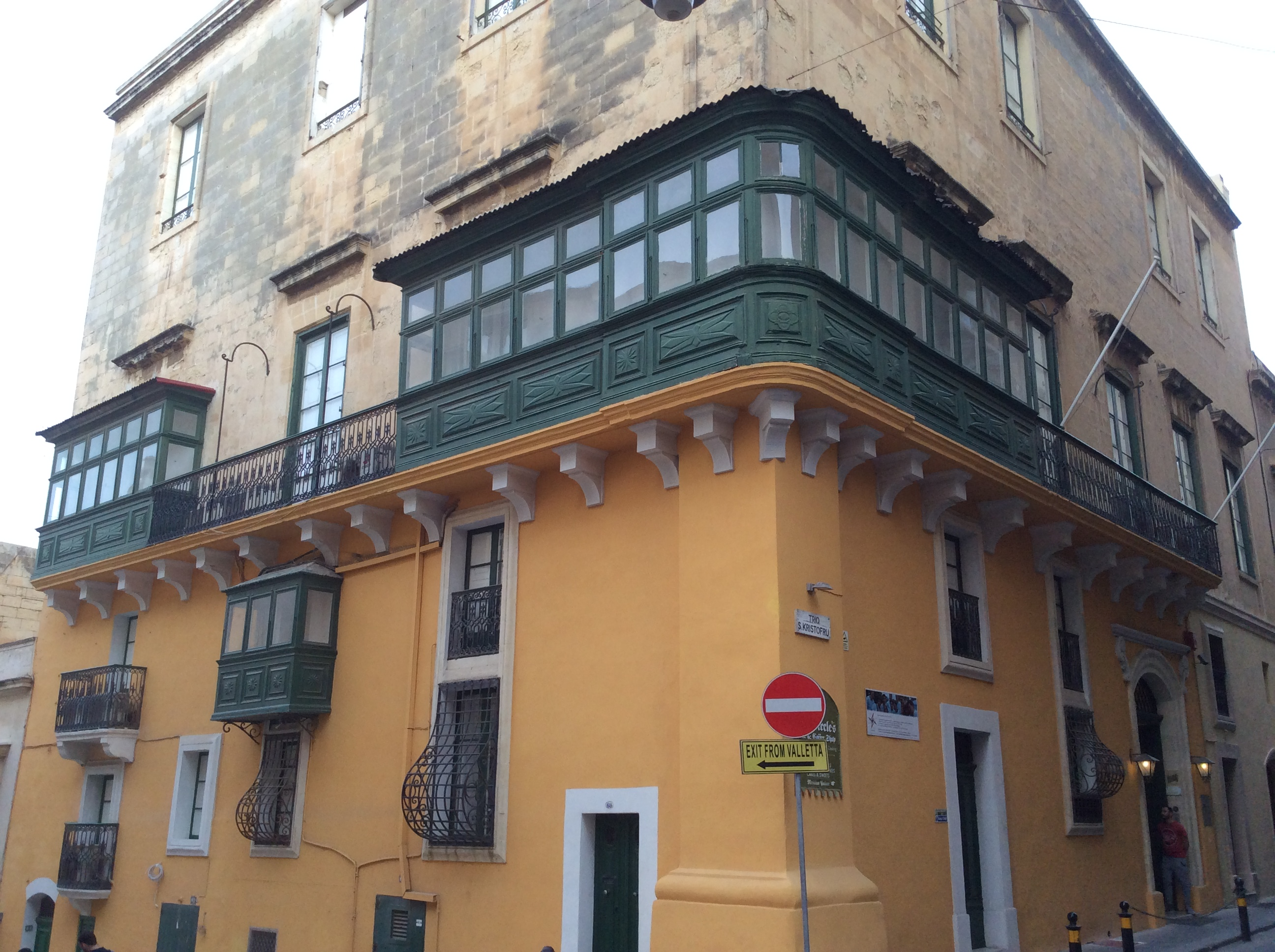
Messina Palace

The Messina Palace, also known as Palazzo Messina, is a palace located at No 141 and 141A Strada San Cristoforo (St. Christopher Street) in Valletta, Malta. It was built by Fra Pietro La Rocca, Prior of Santo Stefano, towards the end of the 16th century and was once part of a grander palace called Casa Rocca Grande. The property has been occupied by the German-Maltese Circle since 1975, who purchased the building from the Stilon family in 1989.

== History ==
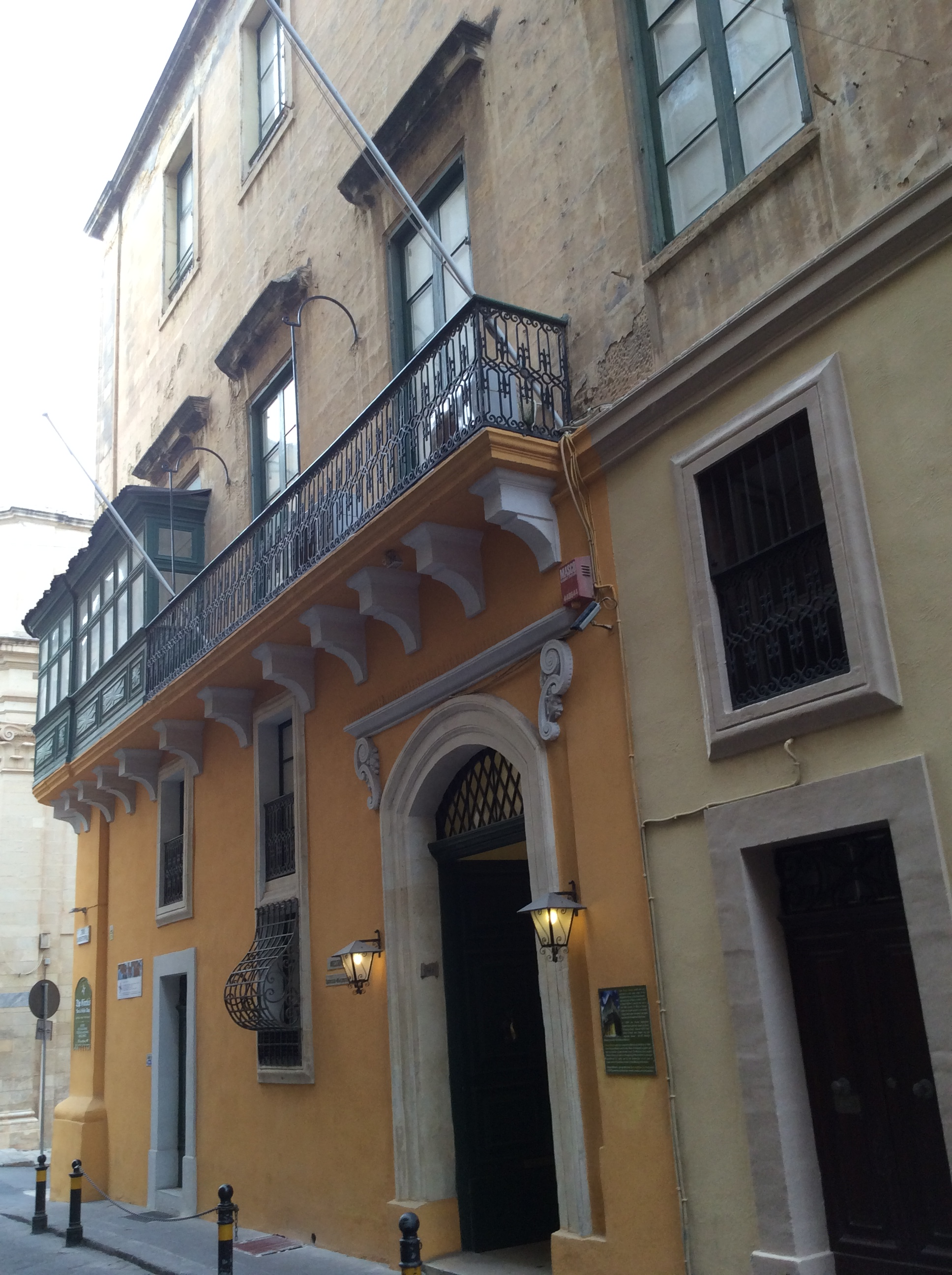
Main entrance

Messina Palace was built some time in the late 16th century and was built by Fra Pietro La Rocca, Prior of Santo Stefano. Upon his death, the Italian Langue fell into ownership of the house and over the next 150 years it was occupied by many wealthy noblemen, many of them admirals and commanders. Fra Francesco Saccano, Prior of Santo Stefano occupied the house in 1614 and Comm. Fra Gio. Batta Macedonio occupied it in 1643. Fra Carlo Spinelli, Bali of Armenia and Captain General of the Galleys owned the house in the late 17th century and was succeeded by Fra Mario Bichi and then Bali Vincenzo Caravita, Admiral of the Order in 1709. In 1685 the value of the Casa Rocca Grande was Scudi 4478., roughly $850.

In 1722, the Palace fell into the possession of Bali Fra Pietro Platamone, Lieutenant to the Admiral, followed by Commander Fra Francesco Pappalettere and then Commander Fra Giuseppe Provana da Colegno who lived there until 1767. Fra Massimiliano Buzzacarini Gonzaga then resided at the house from 1773 but let it to Commander Fra Galgano Scozzini in 1783, Commander Fra Francesco Mazzei in 1785, and to Commander Fra Michel'Angelo Arezzo in 1791. On July 16, 1783, a council decree ordered a revaluation of the properties belonging to the Italian Langue, and rent was increased to the then exorbitant annual fee of Sc. 360 per annum. This fee was appealed to the council and was later reduced on June 3, 1786 to Sc. 240 per annum.

Count Francesco Sant purchased the house from the French Republican Government on 21 August 1798 and sometime in the nineteenth century the houses of the Casa Rocca Grande became divided. The Casa Rocca Grande was divided into what is known today as the Palazzo Marina and the Palazzo Messina. When Count Rosario Messina (1796–1875), a wealthy merchant Bagnara, Calabria bought the property some time after 1850 and moved in with his wife and their five children, the building became known as the Palazzo Messina.

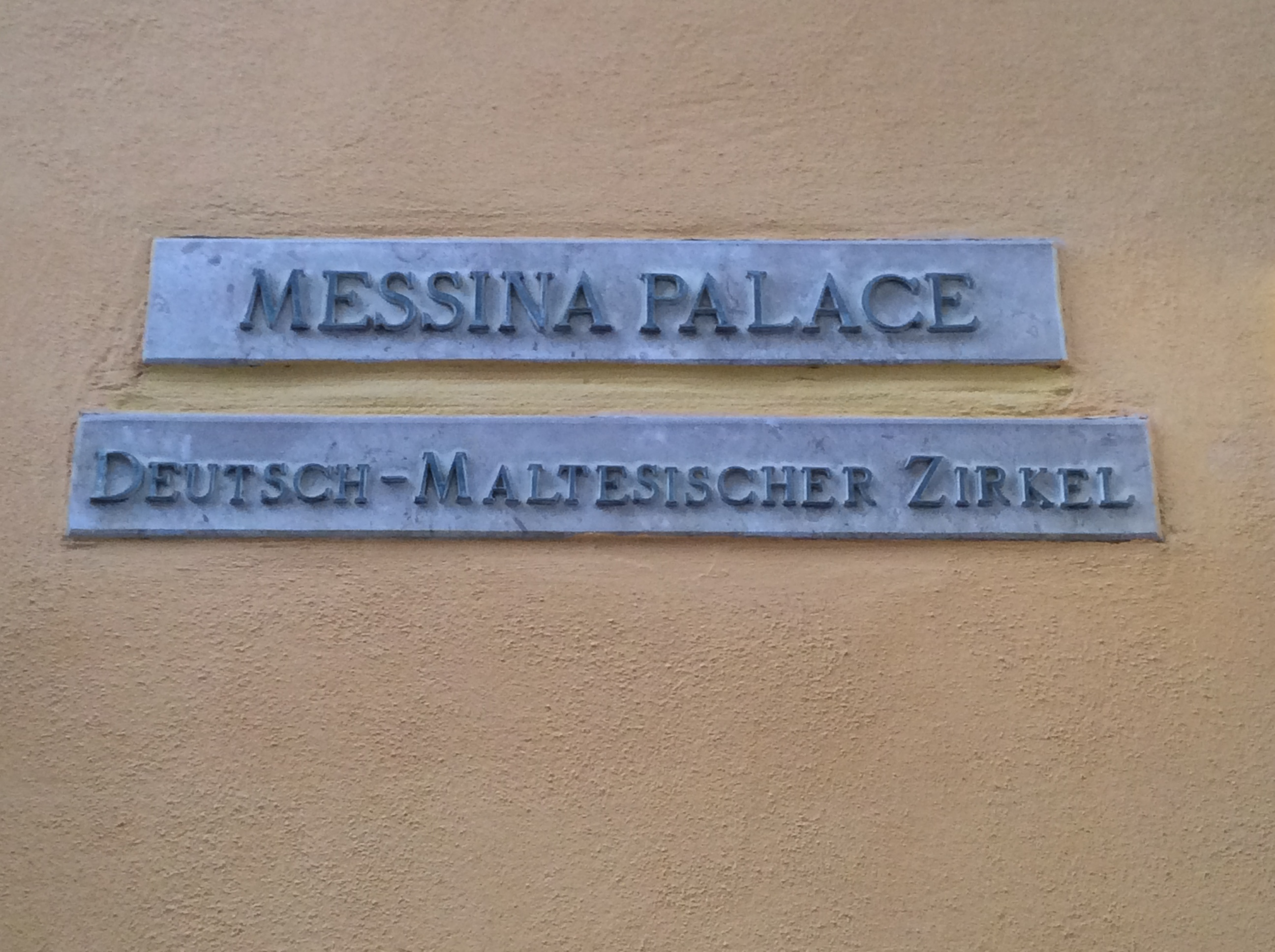
Plaque of the palace and the German-Maltese Circle

When Count Rosario Messina died in 1875 it fell into ownership of Count Dr Giovanni Messina, who would later become President of the Malta Chamber of Commerce from 1894–1911 and his brother Francesco, also a lawyer who ran a family bank at 141A, St. Christopher Street. In 1911, Messina Palace was bequeathed to Giovanni's daughter Maria and to his nieces. When Countess Lucia Messina, wife of Francesco and who benefited from the usufruct on the Palace, left the premises in 1939 during the outbreak of World War II it was requisitioned and used by the Maltese government as a school and then for many years as an Educational ministry building. In 1975, the Palace was leased to the German-Maltese Circle and was purchased by them, with financial aid from the Federal Republic of Germany in 1989. They have retained the Messina Palace their headquarters to this day.

== Architecture ==
The Messina Palace is located on a street corner of Strada San Cristoforo with Republic Street. Historically Strada San Cristoforo was named Strada della Fontana in referenced to a spring in the area that served the population with drinking water. During the French occupation the street was known as Rue des Droits de l'Homme . The building is built from grey stone but the lower part of the building is painted yellow. The balustrades of the balcony, supported by white brackets are painted black as are the bars to the windows. The door is green and is surrounded by a white frame. The courtyard to the building is arched. The main hall is elegant, with a grand staircase and marble furnishings. The Messina family coat of arms can still be seen inlaid into the marble in the Palace's main hall whose ceiling is surrounded by colorful frescoes. The Messina Palace has its own private chapel with a marble altar. The chapel has a very high ceiling but is narrow in width. Tall glass doors access it, the walls are painted white and the floor is chequered with yellow and white tiles. A traditional Maltese spiral staircase leads up to the roof. A bar and coffee shop is located on the ground floor.

Today, the Palace is the centre for German - Maltese cultural and educational activities.
