= Berkarar (disambiguation) =

Berkarar, in Turkmen, is an adjective that roughly translates as "Stable." It is vastly used by the government of Turkmenistan in its vocabulary and in toponyms, such as the following ones:

== Places ==
=== Towns ===
- Berkarar, Ak bugdaý, town in Ahal Province, Turkmenistan.
- Berkarar, Baýramaly, town in Mary Province, Turkmenistan.

=== Villages ===
- Berkarar, Sarahs, village in Ahal Province, Turkmenistan.

=== Other ===
- Berkarar, a shopping mall in Ashgabat, Turkmenistan.
