= Floh =

Floh or variation, may refer to:

- DFW Floh, a German WWI biplane fighter
- Fokker V.1, a German WWI fighter nicknamed "Floh"
- Floh (book), a 2001 photobook by Tacita Dean
- "Floh" (song), a 2013 song by Madlib from Rock Konducta
- Floh, Floh-Seligenthal, Schmalkalden-Meiningen, Thuringia, Germany

== See also ==
- Meister Floh (novel), 1822 fantasy novel by ETA Hoffmann
- Flohlied (German: Floh song), an 1844 composition by Franz Liszt; see List of compositions by Franz Liszt
- Flow (disambiguation)
- Flou (disambiguation)
- Floe (disambiguation)
- Flo (disambiguation)
- Flea (disambiguation) (German: floh; English: flea)
