= Flow =

Flow may refer to:

== Science and technology ==
- Fluid flow, the motion of a gas or liquid
- Flow (geomorphology), a type of mass wasting or slope movement in geomorphology
- Flow (mathematics), a group action of the real numbers on a set
- Flow (psychology), a mental state of being fully immersed and focused
- Flow, a spacecraft of NASA's GRAIL program

=== Computing ===
- Flow network, graph-theoretic version of a mathematical flow
- Dataflow, a broad concept in computer systems with many different meanings

==== As a proper noun ====
- Microsoft Flow (renamed to Power Automate in 2019), a workflow toolkit in Microsoft Dynamics
- Neos Flow, a free and open source web application framework written in PHP
- webMethods Flow, a graphical programming language
- FLOW (programming language), an educational programming language from the 1970s
- Flow (web browser), a web browser with a proprietary rendering engine
- Google Flow, a generative AI video creation tool

== Arts, entertainment and media ==
- Flow (journal), an online journal of television and media studies
- Flow Podcast, a Brazilian podcast group about various themes
- The Flow (book), a 2022 non-fiction book by Amy-Jane Beer
- Flow (video game)
- Flow (comics), a fictional character in the International Ultramarine Corps
- Flow 93.5, the Canadian radio station CFXJ-FM
- Flow FM (Australia), a radio station
- Flow (Argentina), a cable television operator

=== Film and television ===
- Flow (television), the sequencing of TV material from one element to the next
- Flow TV, a network of Ripe Digital Entertainment
- Flow: For Love of Water, a 2008 documentary film directed by Irena Salina
- Flow (1996 film), a 1996 film by Quentin Lee
- Flow (2014 film) (Danish: Ækte vare), 2014 film by Fenar Ahmad
- Flow (2024 film) (Latvian: Straume), a 2024 animated feature directed by Gints Zilbalodis

=== Music ===
- Flow (rapping), the rhythms and rhymes of a hip-hop song's lyrics and how they interact
- Flow (American band), a new age band
- Flow G, Filipino rapper and songwriter
- Flow (Japanese band), a rock group
- Flow (rapper) (Widner DeGruy, born 1991)
- Flow (Terence Blanchard album), 2005
- Flow (Conception album), 1997
- Flow (Foetus album), 2001
- The Flow, a 1997 album by Chris Leslie
- Flow (EP), a 2024 EP by Onew
- Flow, a 2023 album by Slowly Rolling Camera
- "Flow", a song by Cage the Elephant from the 2011 album Thank You, Happy Birthday
- "Flow", a song by Cloud Wan from The Cloud, 2022
- "Flow", a song by Opus III from Mind Fruit
- "Flow", a song by Sade from the 2000 album Lovers Rock

== Other uses ==
- Flow (brand), a Caribbean telecommunications provider
- Flow (policy debate), a form of note-taking in policy debate and public forum debate
- Flow (psychology), the mental state in which a person performing some activity is fully immersed in a feeling of energized focus, full involvement, and enjoyment in the process of the activity
- Flow (real estate company), an American residential real estate company
- FLOW (Belgium), a national health care network

== See also ==
- Flo (disambiguation)
- Floe (disambiguation)
- Floh (disambiguation)
- Flou (disambiguation)
- Streamflow, or channel runoff, the flow of water in streams, rivers, and other channels
- Phlow, a German webzine
