= Flo (name) =

Flo is a name which it is often used of a short form (hypocorism) of Florence. It may refer to:

== Given name or nickname ==
- Flo Ankah, French actress, singer, and filmmaker
- Flo Bojaj (born 1996), Kosovo Albanian footballer
- Flo Cluff (1902–1990), Australian trade unionist
- Flo Gennaro (born 1991), Argentine fashion model
- Flo Hyman (1954–1986), American volleyball player
- Flo McGarrell (1974–2010), American artist
- Flo Milli (born 2000), American rapper
- Flo Morrissey (born 1994), English singer-songwriter
- Flo Mounier (born 1974), Canadian drummer
- Flo Perkins (born 1951), American glass artist
- Flo Perry (born 1992), British feminist artist and writer
- Flo Rida (born 1979), American rapper
- Flo Sandon's (1924–2006), Italian singer
- Flo Steinberg (1939–2017), American comic book publisher
- Flo Thamba (born 1999), Congolese basketball player
- Flo V. Schwarz, German musician
- Flo Whyard (1917–2012), Canadian politician
- Flo Wilson (born 1963), English actress
- Flo Ziegfeld (1867–1932), American theatre impresario
- Mark Volman (born 1947), pseudonym Flo, American musician
- Florentino Fernández (actor) (born 1972), known as Flo, Spanish actor and comedian
- Frederick Law Olmsted (1822–1903), or FLO, American journalist and landscape designer

== Surname ==
- Asbjørn Blokkum Flø (born 1973), Norwegian composer
- Håvard Flo (born 1970), Norwegian footballer
- Helge Flo (born 1966), Norwegian Paralympic cross-country skier
- Jostein Flo (born 1964), Norwegian footballer
- Per-Egil Flo (born 1989), Norwegian footballer
- Rasmus Flo (1851–1905), Norwegian proponent of the use of Nynorsk
- Tore André Flo (born 1973), Norwegian footballer
- Ulrik Flo (born 1988), Norwegian footballer
- Adolphe Le Flô (1804–1887), French Army general and politician
