= Flo (retailer) =

Turkish footwear retailer

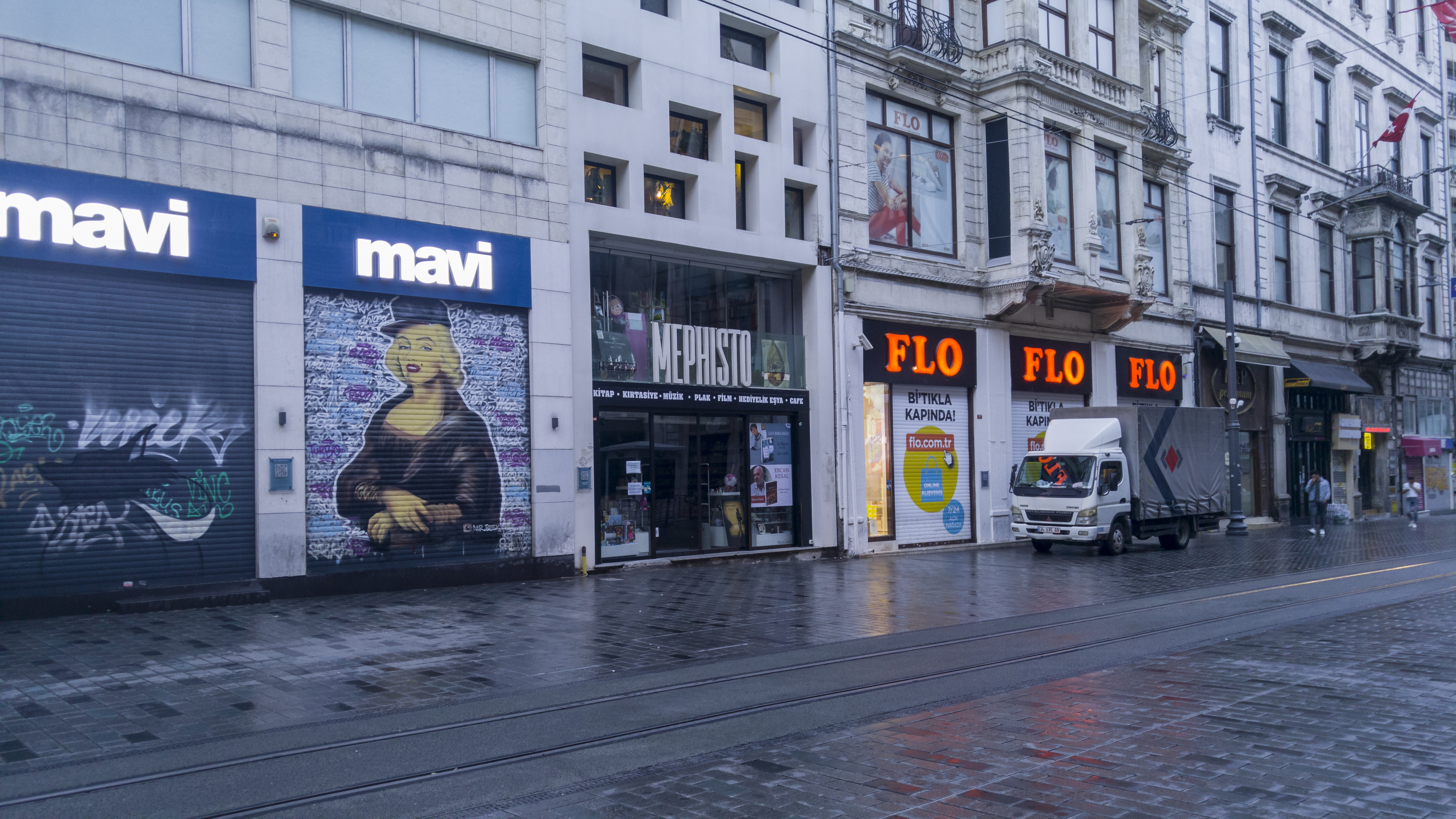
A FLO footwear store along İstiklal Caddesi ("Independence Avenue"), Istanbul, Turkey

FLO both a footwear corporation based in the Bağcılar district of Istanbul, Turkey, founded in 1960. It employs about 15,000 people as of 2024. Its division FLO Mağazacılık (Turkish: Flo Retailing) operates more than 850 stores in 30 countries, of which about 500 in Turkey as well as Russia, Ukraine, the Caucasus, the Middle East, Algeria, Morocco, Albania, Kosovo, and Kenya. It also operates e-commerce channels serving multiple national markets, as well as a wholesale network and merchandising.

Retail stores are operated as FLO, but also Nine West and InStreet.

== History ==
FLO was founded in 1960. IN 2012, FLO bought the Italian brand Lumberjack. In 2020, FLO opened its first store in Ukraine in Lviv in the Forum Lviv mall, and the same year another in Kyiv in the Prospekt mall (ТРК Проспект). in partnership with the Ukrainian company Arricano Real Estate plc. In 2022 FLO opened its first store in Turkmenistan, at Berkarar mall, the country's largest, in the capital Ashgabat. The same year, FLO bought the Russian operations of Reebok, as Western companies left Russia after sanctions. And also in 2022 FLO entered a joint venture with Moroccan company Shoeleven to open a new shoe factory in Casablanca, Morocco.

== Geographical presence ==
FLO stores are located in these countries as well as others:

Europe/Asia: Turkey; Azerbaijan; Georgia; Russia (former Reebok stores)	Europe: Albania; Kosovo; Ukraine; Cyprus; Montenegro; Kosovo	Middle East: Iraq (Federal Iraq and Kurdistan); Jordan; Qatar; Saudi Arabia; Lebanon; Syria	Central Asia: Kazakhstan (2024: 7 stores); Turkmenistan	Africa: Algeria; Kenya; Libya; Egypt; Tunisia; Democratic Republic of the Congo; Tanzania; Morocco
