= Antonie van Leeuwenhoek =

Dutch microbiologist (1632–1723)

Antonie van Leeuwenhoek FRS
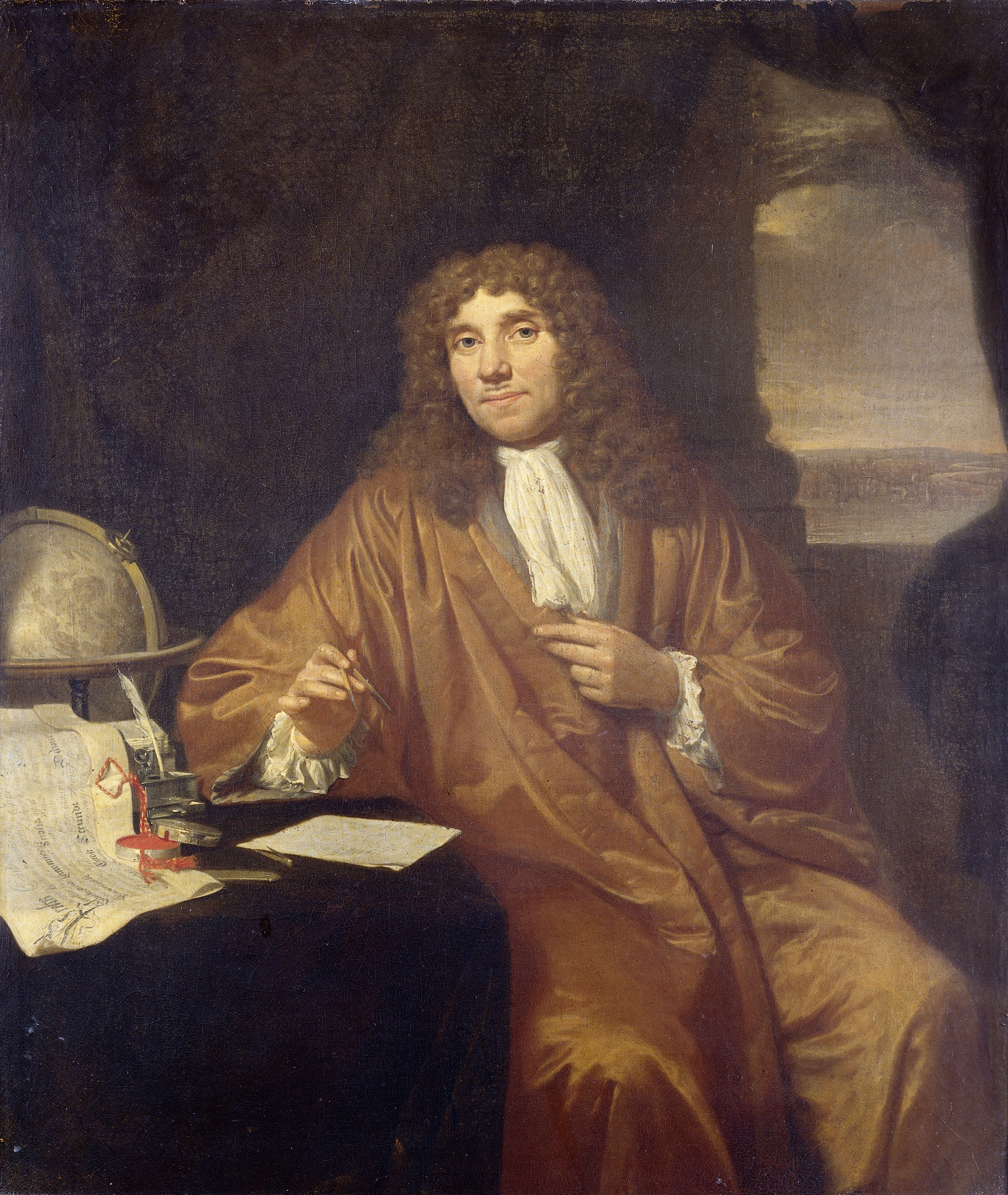
- Portrait by Jan Verkolje, after 1680
- Born: 24 October 1632; Delft, Dutch Republic
- Died: 26 August 1723 (aged 90); Delft, Dutch Republic
- Known for: First acknowledged microscopist and microbiologist in history (Note: Van Leeuwenhoek is universally acknowledged as the father of microbiology because he was the first to undisputedly discover/observe, describe, study, conduct scientific experiments with microscopic organisms (microbes), and relatively determine their size, using single-lensed microscopes of his own design. Leeuwenhoek is also considered to be the father of bacteriology and protozoology (recently known as protistology).); Microscopic discovery of microorganisms (animalcule)
- Scientific career
- Fields: Microscopy; Microbiology

Antonie Philips van Leeuwenhoek (Note: The spelling of Van Leeuwenhoek's name is exceptionally varied. He was christened as Thonis, but always went by Antonj (corresponding with the English Antony). The final j of his given name is the Dutch tense i. Until 1683 he consistently used the spelling Antonj Leeuwenhoeck (ending in –oeck) when signing his letters. Throughout the mid-1680s he experimented with the spelling of his surname, and after 1685 settled on the most recognized spelling, Van Leeuwenhoek.) (/ˈɑːntəni vɑːn ˈleɪwənhuːk, -hʊk/ AHN-tə-nee vahn LAY-wən-hook, -huuk; Dutch: [ˈɑntoːni vɑn ˈleːu.ə(n)ˌɦuk]; 24 October 1632 – 26 August 1723) was a Dutch microbiologist and microscopist in the Golden Age of Dutch art, science and technology. A largely self-taught man in science, he is commonly known as "the Father of Microbiology", and one of the first microscopists and microbiologists. Van Leeuwenhoek is best known for his pioneering work in microscopy and for his contributions toward the establishment of microbiology as a scientific discipline.

Raised in Delft, Dutch Republic, Van Leeuwenhoek worked as a draper in his youth and founded his own shop in 1654. He became well-recognized in municipal politics and developed an interest in lensmaking. In the 1670s, he started to explore microbial life with his microscope.

Using single-lensed microscopes of his own design and make, Van Leeuwenhoek was the first to observe and to experiment with microbes, which he originally referred to as dierkens, diertgens or diertjes. (Note: Dutch for 'small animals' (translated into English as animalcules, from animalculum Latin for 'tiny animal')) He was the first to relatively determine their size. Most of the "animalcules" are now referred to as unicellular organisms, although he observed multicellular organisms in pond water. He was also the first to document microscopic observations of muscle fibers, bacteria, spermatozoa, red blood cells, and crystals in gouty tophi, and was among the first to see blood flow in capillaries. Although Van Leeuwenhoek did not write any books, he described his discoveries in chaotic letters to the Royal Society, which published many of his letters in their Philosophical Transactions.

== Early life and career ==
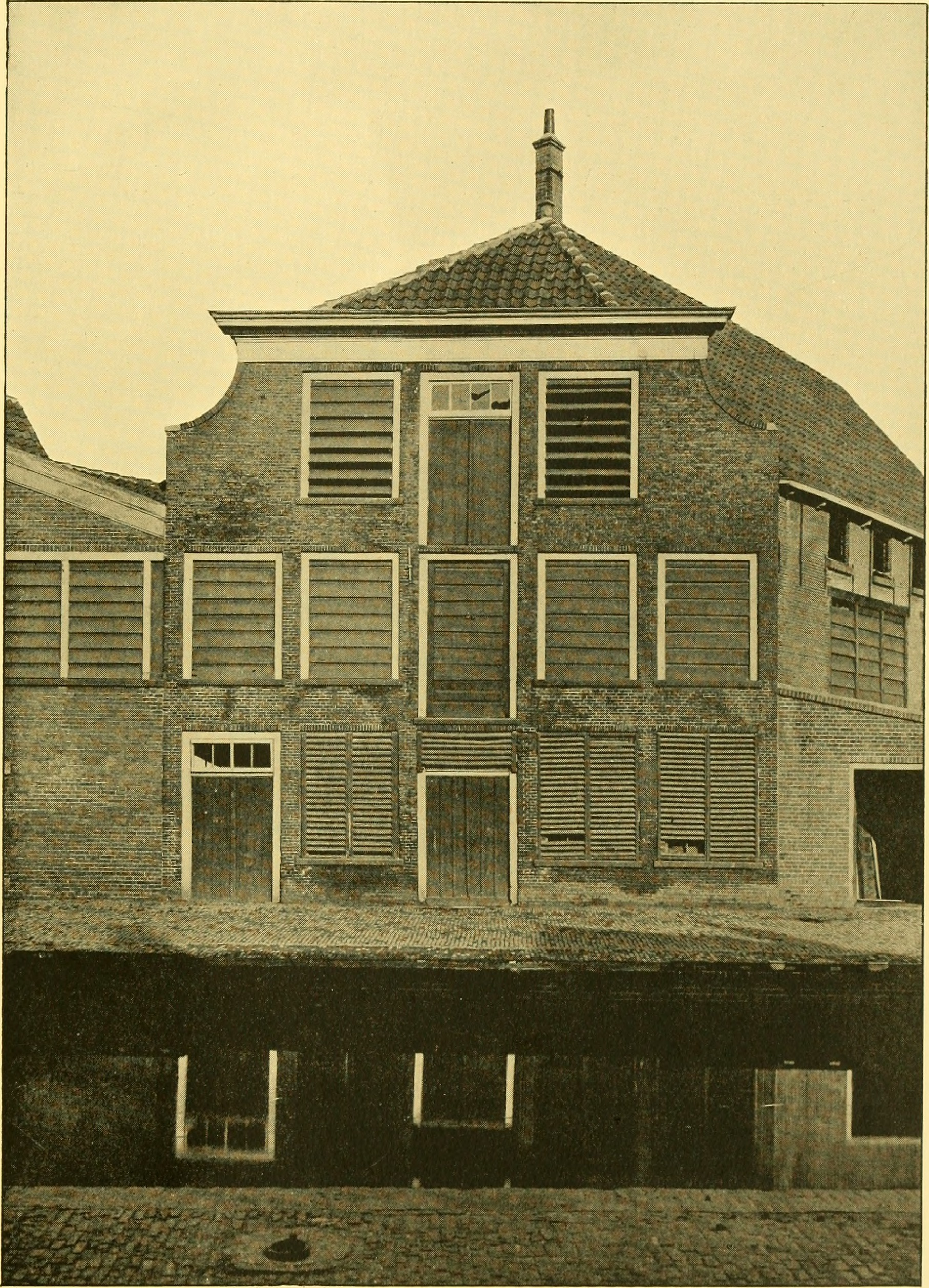
Van Leeuwenhoek's birth house at Oosteinde, before it was demolished in 1926

Antonie van Leeuwenhoek was born in Delft, Dutch Republic, on 24 October 1632. On 4 November, he was baptized as Thonis. His father, Philips Antonisz van Leeuwenhoek, was a basket maker who died when Antonie was five years old. His mother, Margaretha (Bel van den Berch), came from a well-to-do brewer's family. She remarried Jacob Jansz Molijn, a painter and the family moved to Warmond around 1640. Antonie had four older sisters: Margriet, Geertruyt, Neeltje, and Catharina. When he was around ten years old his step-father died. He was sent to live in Benthuizen with his uncle, an attorney. At the age of 16 he became a bookkeeper's apprentice (casher) at a linen-draper's shop at Warmoesstraat in Amsterdam, which was owned by William Davidson. Van Leeuwenhoek left there after six years.

In July 1654, Van Leeuwenhoek married Barbara de Mey in Delft, with whom he fathered one surviving daughter, Maria (four other children died in infancy). He would live and study for the rest of his life at Hypolytusbuurt in a house he bought in 1655. He opened a draper's shop, selling linen, yarn and ribbon to seamstresses and tailors. His status in Delft grew throughout the years. In 1660 he received a lucrative job as chamberlain for the sheriffs in the city hall, a position which he would hold for almost 40 years. His duties included maintaining the premises, heating, cleaning, opening for meetings, performing duties for those assembled, and maintaining silence on all matters discussed there.

In 1669 he was appointed as a land surveyor by the court of Holland; at some time he combined it with another municipal job, being the official "wine-gauger" of Delft and in charge of the city wine imports and taxation. His wife had died in 1666, and in 1671, Van Leeuwenhoek remarried to Cornelia Swalmius with whom he had no children.

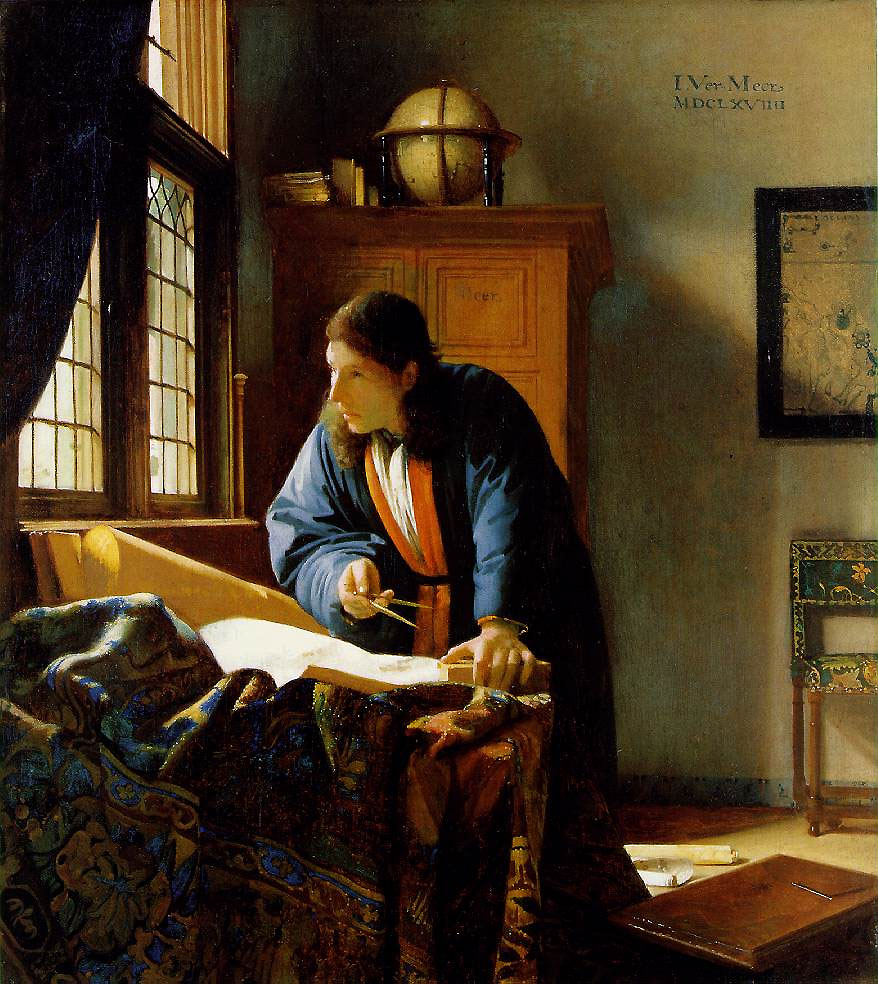
The Geographer by Johannes Vermeer

Van Leeuwenhoek was a contemporary of another famous Delft citizen, the painter Johannes Vermeer, who was baptized just four days earlier. It has been suggested that he is the man portrayed in two Vermeer paintings of the late 1660s, The Astronomer and The Geographer, but others argue that there appears to be little physical similarity. Because they were both relatively important men in a city with only 24,000 inhabitants, living both close to the main market, it is likely they knew each other. Van Leeuwenhoek acted as the executor of Vermeer's will when the painter died in 1675. (Note: In A Short History of Nearly Everything (p. 236) Bill Bryson alludes to rumors that Vermeer's mastery of light and perspective came from use of a camera obscura produced by Van Leeuwenhoek. This is one of the examples of the controversial Hockney–Falco thesis, which claims that some of the Old Masters used optical aids to produce their masterpieces.)

Van Leeuwenhoek's religion was "Dutch Reformed" and Calvinist. Like Jan Swammerdam he often referred with reverence to the wonders God designed in making creatures great and small, and believed that his discoveries were merely further proof of the wonder of creation.

== Microscopic study ==
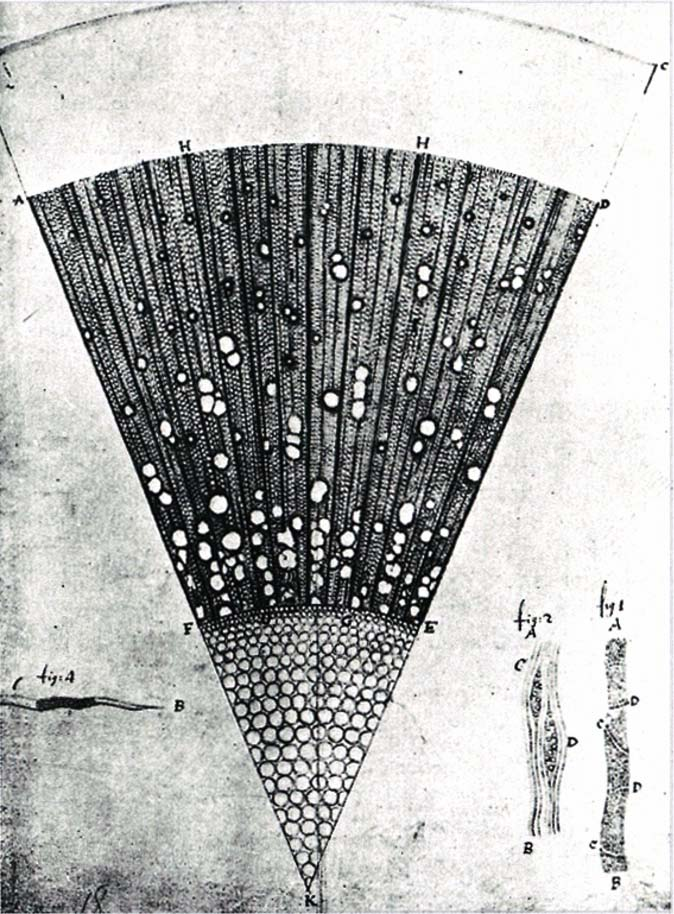
A microscopic section of a one-year-old ash tree (Fraxinus) wood, drawing made by Van Leeuwenhoek

While running his draper shop, Van Leeuwenhoek wanted to see the quality of the thread better than what was possible using the magnifying lenses of the time. He developed an interest in lensmaking, although few records exist of his early activity. By placing the middle of a small rod of soda lime glass in a hot flame, one can pull the hot section apart to create two long whiskers of glass. Then, by reinserting the end of one whisker into the flame, a very small, high-quality glass lens is created. Significantly, a May 2021 neutron tomography study of a high-magnification Leeuwenhoek microscope captured images of the short glass stem characteristic of this lens creation method. For lower magnifications he also made ground lenses. To help keep his methods confidential he apparently intentionally encouraged others to think grinding was his primary or only lens construction method.

=== Recognition by the Royal Society ===
After developing his method for creating powerful lenses and applying them to the study of the microscopic world, Van Leeuwenhoek introduced his work to his friend, the prominent Dutch physician Reinier de Graaf. When the Royal Society in London published the groundbreaking work of an Italian lensmaker in their journal Philosophical Transactions of the Royal Society, de Graaf wrote to the editor of the journal, Henry Oldenburg, with a ringing endorsement of Van Leeuwenhoek's microscopes which, he claimed, "far surpass those which we have hitherto seen". In response, in 1673 the society published a letter from Van Leeuwenhoek that included his microscopic observations on mold, bees, and lice. Then, in 1674, Van Leeuwenhoek made his most significant discovery. Starting from the assumption that life and motility are similar, he determined that the moving objects observed under his microscope were little animals. He later recorded his observations in his diary.

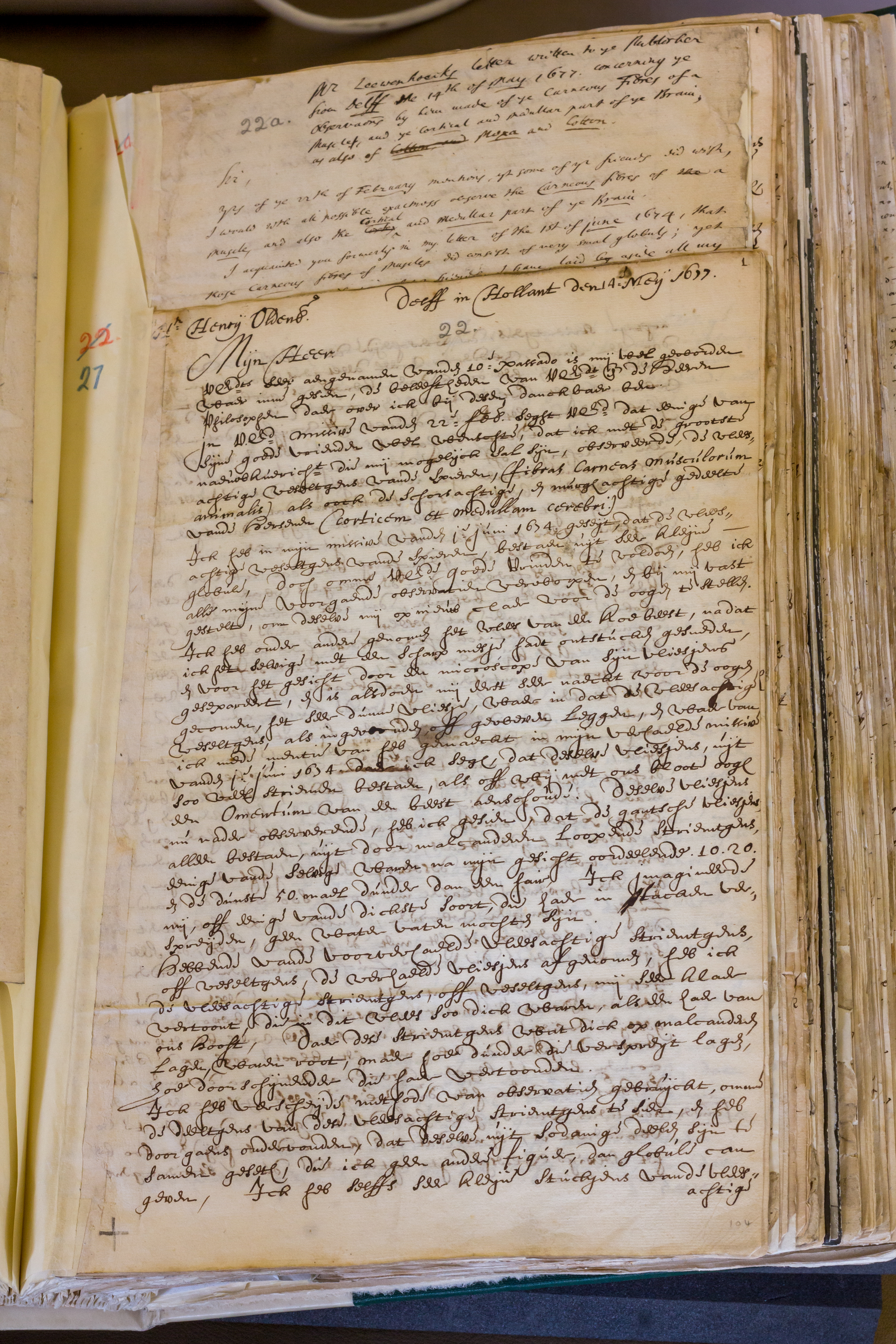
A 1677 letter from Van Leeuwenhoek to Oldenburg, with the latter's English translation behind. The full correspondence remains in the Royal Society Library in London.

Van Leeuwenhoek's work fully captured the attention of the Royal Society, and he began corresponding regularly with the society regarding his observations. At first he had been reluctant to publicize his findings, regarding himself as a businessman with little scientific, artistic, or writing background, but de Graaf urged him to be more confident in his work. By the time Van Leeuwenhoek died in 1723, he had written some 190 letters to the Royal Society, detailing his findings in a wide variety of fields, centered on his work in microscopy. He only wrote letters in his own colloquial Dutch; he never published a proper scientific paper in Latin. He strongly preferred to work alone, distrusting the sincerity of those who offered their assistance. The letters were translated into Latin or English by Henry Oldenburg, who had learned Dutch for this very purpose. He was also the first to use the word animalcules to translate the Dutch words that Van Leeuwenhoek used to describe microorganisms. Despite the initial success of Van Leeuwenhoek's relationship with the Royal Society, soon relations became severely strained. His credibility was questioned when he sent the Royal Society a copy of his first observations of microscopic single-celled organisms dated 9 October 1676. Previously, the existence of single-celled organisms was entirely unknown. Thus, even with his established reputation with the Royal Society as a reliable observer, his observations of microscopic life were initially met with some skepticism.

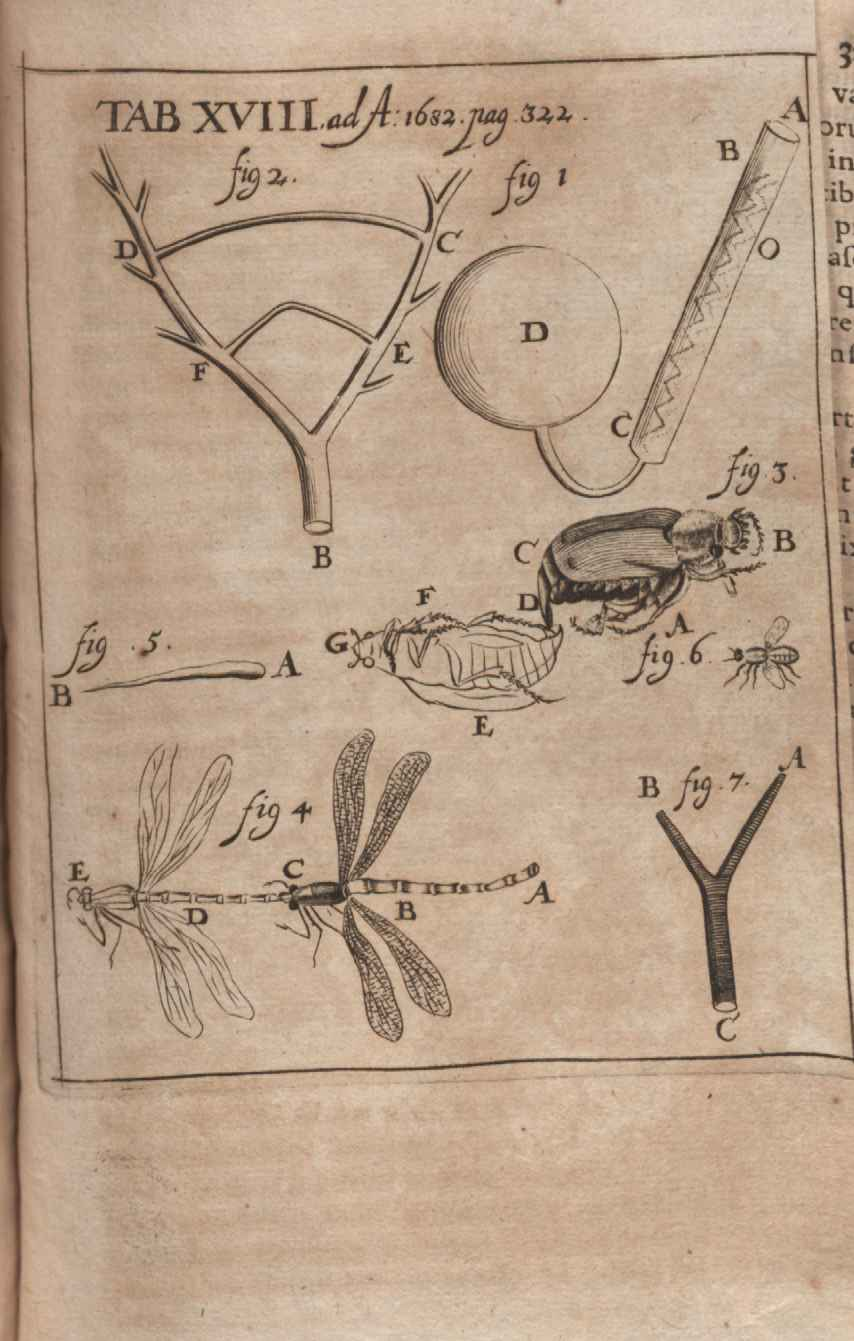
Illustration of critique of Observationes microscopicae Antonii Levvenhoeck... published in Acta Eruditorum, 1682

Eventually, in the face of Van Leeuwenhoek's insistence, the Royal Society arranged for Alexander Petrie, minister to the English Reformed Church in Delft; Benedict Haan, at that time Lutheran minister at Delft; and Henrik Cordes, then Lutheran minister at the Hague, accompanied by Sir Robert Gordon and four others, to determine whether it was in fact Van Leeuwenhoek's ability to observe and reason clearly, or perhaps, the Royal Society's theories of life that might require reform. Finally in 1677, Van Leeuwenhoek's observations were fully acknowledged by the Royal Society.

Van Leeuwenhoek was elected to the Royal Society in February 1680 on the nomination of William Croone, a then-prominent physician. (Note: He was also nominated as a "corresponding member" of the French Academy of Sciences in 1699, but there is no evidence that the nomination was accepted, nor that he was ever aware of it.) Van Leeuwenhoek was "taken aback" by the nomination, which he considered a high honour, although he did not attend the induction ceremony in London, nor did he ever attend a Royal Society meeting. He had his portrait painted by Jan Verkolje with the certificate signed by James II of England on the table beside him.

=== Scientific fame ===
By the end of the seventeenth century, Van Leeuwenhoek had a virtual monopoly on microscopic study and discovery. His contemporary Robert Hooke, an early microscope pioneer, bemoaned that the field had come to rest entirely on one man's shoulders. In 1673, his first letter was published in the journal of the Royal Society of London. He was visited over the years by many notable individuals who gazed at the tiny creatures. One of the first was Jan Swammerdam. Around 1675, it was Johan Huydecoper, who was very interested in collecting and growing plants for his estate Goudestein, becoming in 1682 manager of the Hortus Botanicus Amsterdam. Christiaan Huygens, Leibniz (1676), John Locke (1678, 1685), James II of England (1679), William III of Orange, Mary II of England and Thomas Molyneux (in 1685) visited. In October 1697, Van Leeuwenhoek visited the Tsar Peter the Great on his boat, moored in the Schie or the Arsenaal. On this occasion, he presented the Tsar with an "eel-viewer", so Peter could study blood circulation whenever he wanted. In 1706, it was Govert Bidloo; in 1714, Richard Bradley (botanist); and, in 1716, Herman Boerhaave and Frederik Ruysch. To the disappointment of his guests, Van Leeuwenhoek refused to reveal the cutting-edge microscopes he relied on for his discoveries, instead showing visitors a collection of average-quality lenses.

== Techniques ==
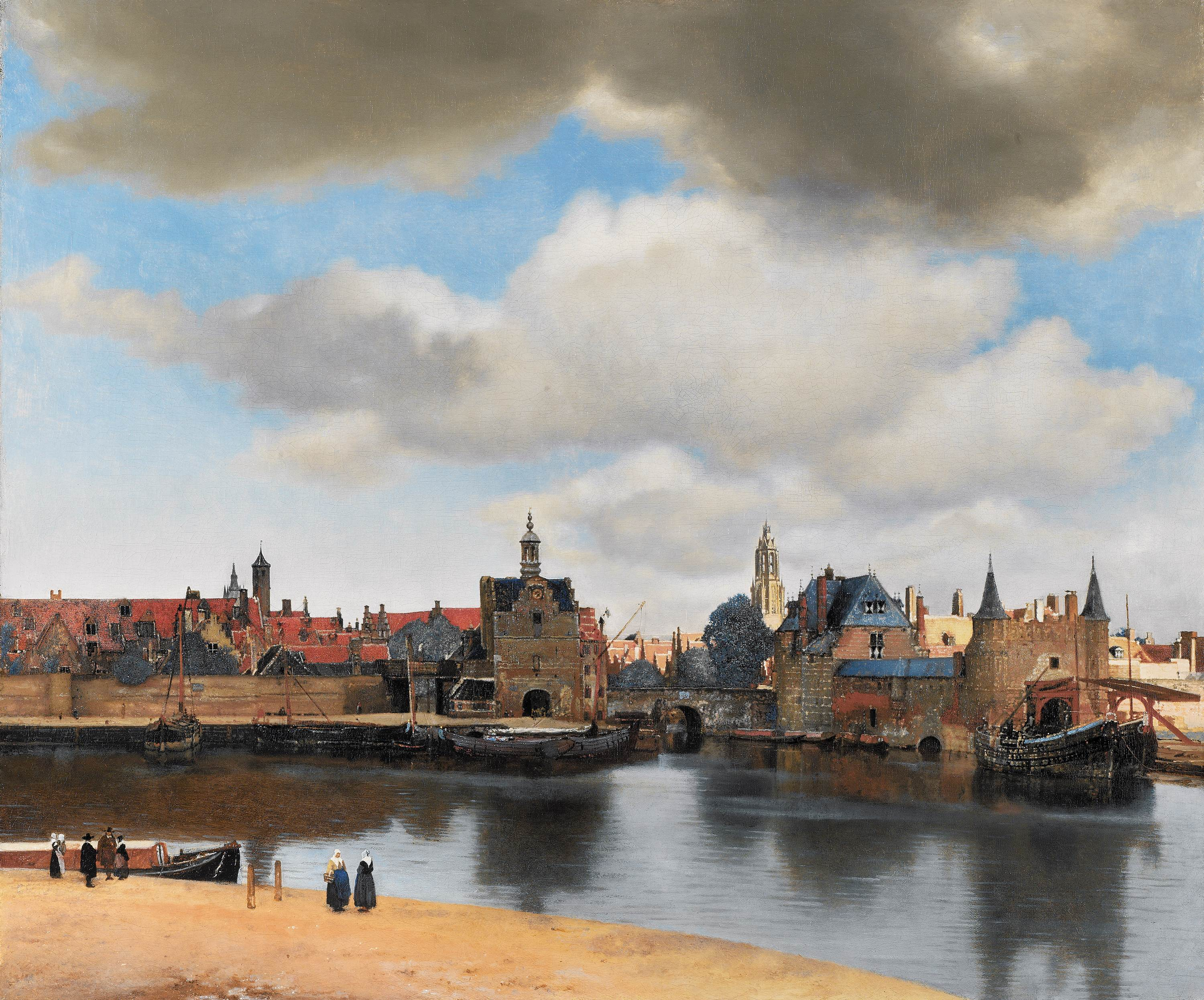
Van Leeuwenhoek was born near the Oostpoort. View of Delft from the east by Johannes Vermeer

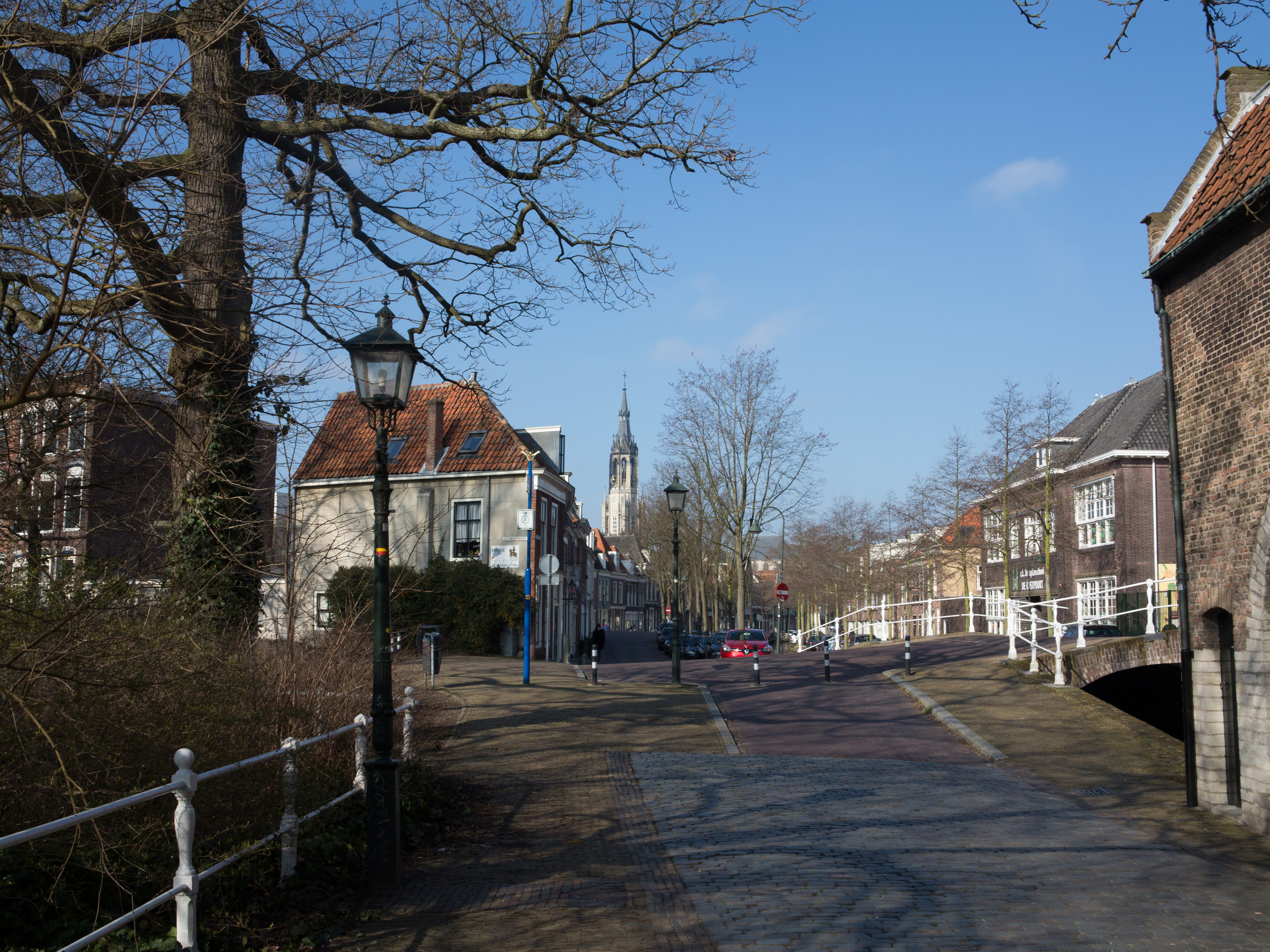
Delft, straatzicht Oosteinde vanaf de Oostpoort

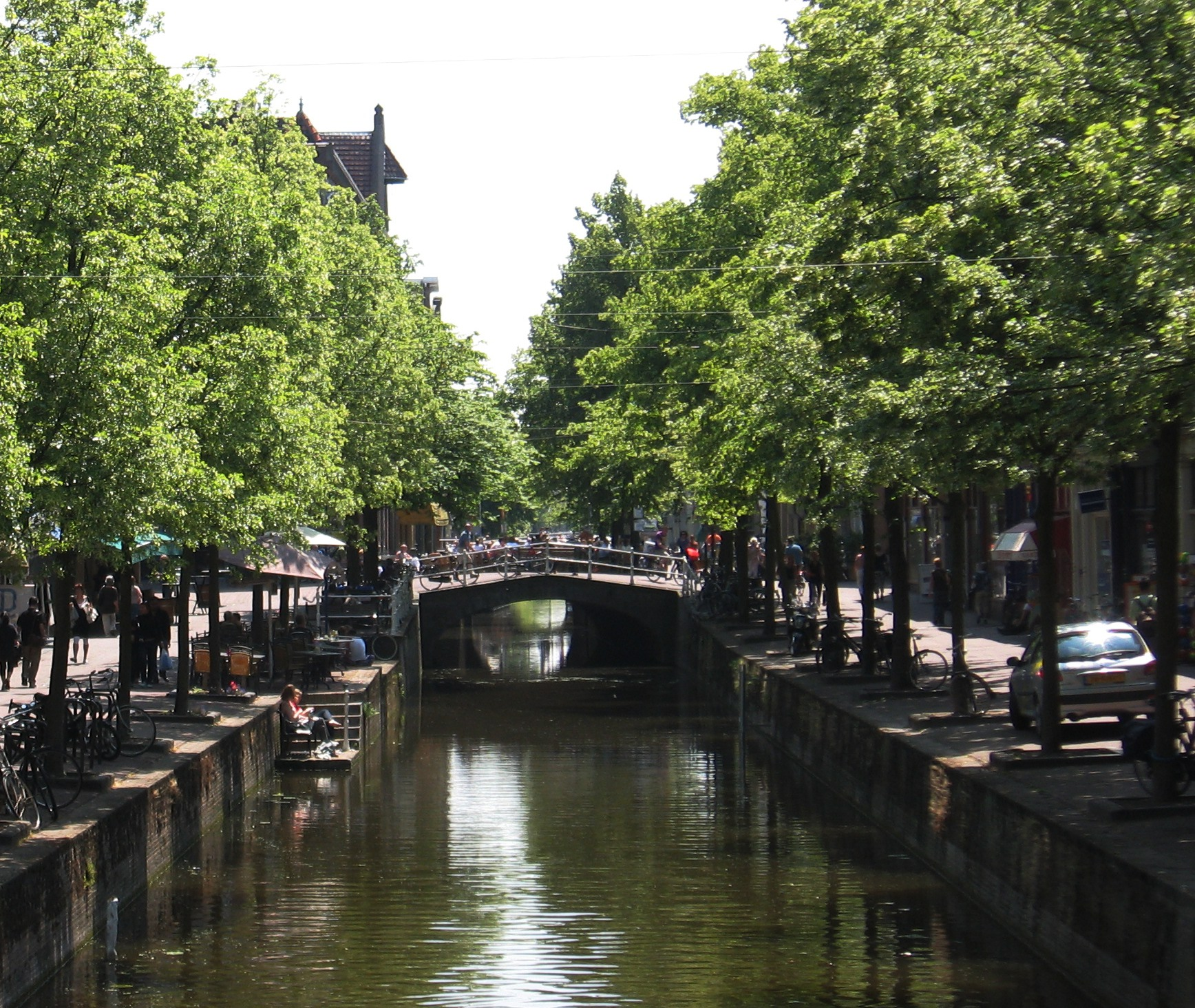
Van Leeuwenhoek lived at Oude Delft, near Warmoesbrug over Hippolytusbuurt

Antonie van Leeuwenhoek made more than 500 optical lenses. He also created at least 25 single-lens microscopes, of differing types, of which only nine have survived. These microscopes were made of silver or copper frames, holding hand-made lenses. Those that have survived are capable of magnification up to 275 times. It is suspected that Van Leeuwenhoek possessed some microscopes that could magnify up to 500 times. Although he has been widely regarded as a dilettante or amateur, his scientific research was of remarkably high quality.

The single-lens microscopes of Van Leeuwenhoek were relatively small devices, the largest being about 5 cm long. They are used by placing the lens very close in front of the eye. The other side of the microscope had a pin, where the sample was attached in order to stay close to the lens. There were also three screws to move the pin and the sample along three axes: one axis to change the focus, and the two other axes to navigate through the sample.

Van Leeuwenhoek maintained throughout his life that there were aspects of microscope construction "which I only keep for myself", in particular his most critical secret of how he made the lenses. For centuries, Van Leeuwenhoek's exact method remained unknown. In 1953, a procedure was published to build a working replica, creating the lens by inserting a thin glass thread into a flame as described above. In May 2021, researchers in the Netherlands published a neutron tomography study of Van Leeuwenhoek's original microscopes, revealing a spherical lens with a short stem attached. This stem was the remaining section of the glass filament used, confirming the method of manufacture. As noted there, this method was originally devised by Robert Hooke rather than Van Leeuwenhoek, which is ironic given Hooke's subsequent surprise at Van Leeuwenhoek's findings.

Van Leeuwenhoek used samples and measurements to estimate numbers of microorganisms in units of water. He also made good use of the huge advantage provided by his method. He studied a broad range of microscopic phenomena, and shared the resulting observations freely with groups such as the British Royal Society. Such work firmly established his place in history as one of the first and most important explorers of the microscopic world. Van Leeuwenhoek was one of the first people to observe cells, much like Robert Hooke. He also corresponded with Antonio Magliabechi.

== Discoveries ==
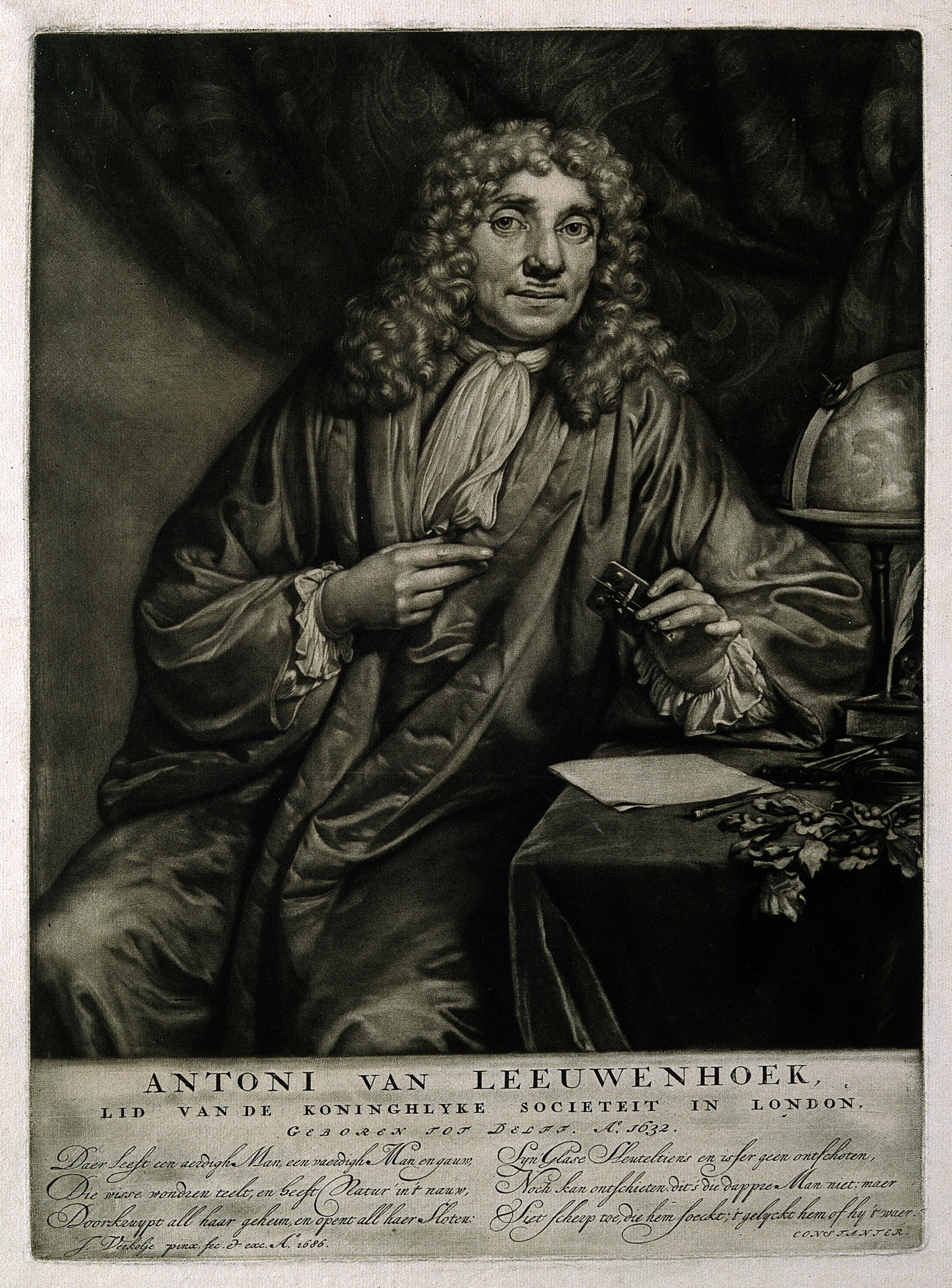
Antoni van Leeuwenhoek. Mezzotint by J. Verkolje, 1686

- Van Leeuwenhoek was one of the first to conduct experiments on himself. It was from his finger that blood was drawn for examination, and he placed pieces of his skin under a microscope, examining its structure in various parts of the body, and counting the number of vessels that permeate it.
- Both Marcello Malpighi and Jan Swammerdam saw these structures before Van Leeuwenhoek, but Van Leeuwenhoek was the first to recognize what they are: red blood cells. Van Leeuwenhoek described the movement of red blood cells within the blood vessels of tadpoles: “If we now plainly perceive that the passage of the blood from the arteries into the veins of the tadpole is not performed in any other than those vessels, which are so minute as only to admit the passage of a single globule at a time, we may conclude that the same is performed in like manner in our own bodies and in those of other animals.”
- Infusoria (protists in modern zoological classification), in 1674
- In 1675, he was studying a variety of minerals, especially salts, and parts of plants and animals.
- The vacuole of the cell in 1676
- Spermatozoa, in 1677. For that he said: “Man comes not from an egg but from an animalcule that is found in male sperm,” and added “For my part, I would say that the male sperm and seeds of plants have been penetrated so far that there is nothing further to discover in this great secret, but I could err in my opinion.”
- The banded pattern of muscular fibers, in 1682
- Bacteria, (e.g., large Selenomonads from the human mouth), in 1683 (Note: The "Lens on Leeuwenhoek" site, which is exhaustively researched and annotated, prints this letter in the original Dutch and in English translation, with the date 17 September 1683. Assuming that the date of 1676 is accurately reported from Pommerville (2014), that book seems more likely to be in error than the intensely detailed, scholarly researched website focused entirely on Van Leeuwenhoek.) (Note: Sixty-two years later, in 1745, a physician correctly attributed a diarrhea epidemic to Van Leeuwenhoek's "bloodless animals" (Valk 1745, cited by Moll 2003).)
- It seems he used horseradish to find out what causes irritation on the tongue. He used the effect of vinegar.
- Van Leeuwenhoek diligently began to search for his animalcules. He found them everywhere: in rotten water, in ditches, on his own teeth. "Although I am now fifty years old," he wrote to the Royal Society, "my teeth are well preserved, because I am in the habit of rubbing them with salt every morning." He described periodontitis.
- In 1684 he published his research on the ovary.
- In 1687, Van Leeuwenhoek reported his research on the coffee bean. He roasted the bean, cut it into slices and saw a spongy interior. The bean was pressed, and an oil appeared. He boiled the coffee with rain water twice and set it aside.
- Van Leeuwenhoek corresponded regularly with Anthonie Heinsius, the Delft pensionary in the States of Holland and in 1687 member of the board of the Delft chamber of the VOC.
- In 1696 Nicolaas Witsen sent him a map of Tartary and ore found near the Amur in Siberia.
- Van Leeuwenhoek has been recognized as the first person to use a histological stain to color specimens observed under the microscope using saffron. He used this technique only once.
- In 1702 he requested a book on Peruvian silver mines in Potosí.

Like Robert Boyle and Nicolaas Hartsoeker, Van Leeuwenhoek was interested in dried cochineal, trying to find out if the dye came from a berry or an insect.

He studied rainwater, the seeds of oranges, worms in sheep's liver, the eye of a whale, the blood of fishes, mites, coccinellidae, the skin of elephants, Celandine, and Cinchona.

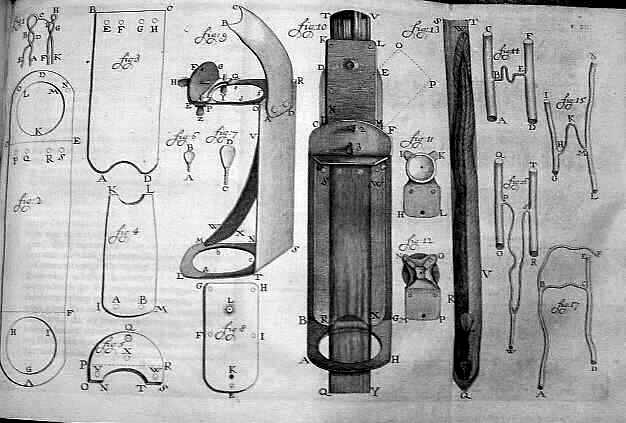
Van Leeuwenhoek's microscopes by Henry Baker

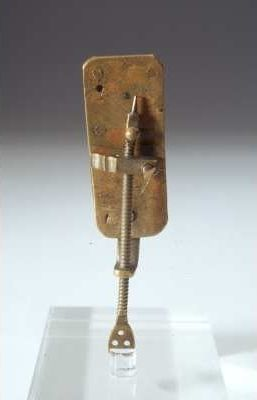
A microscope by Van Leeuwenhoek in Museum Boerhaave

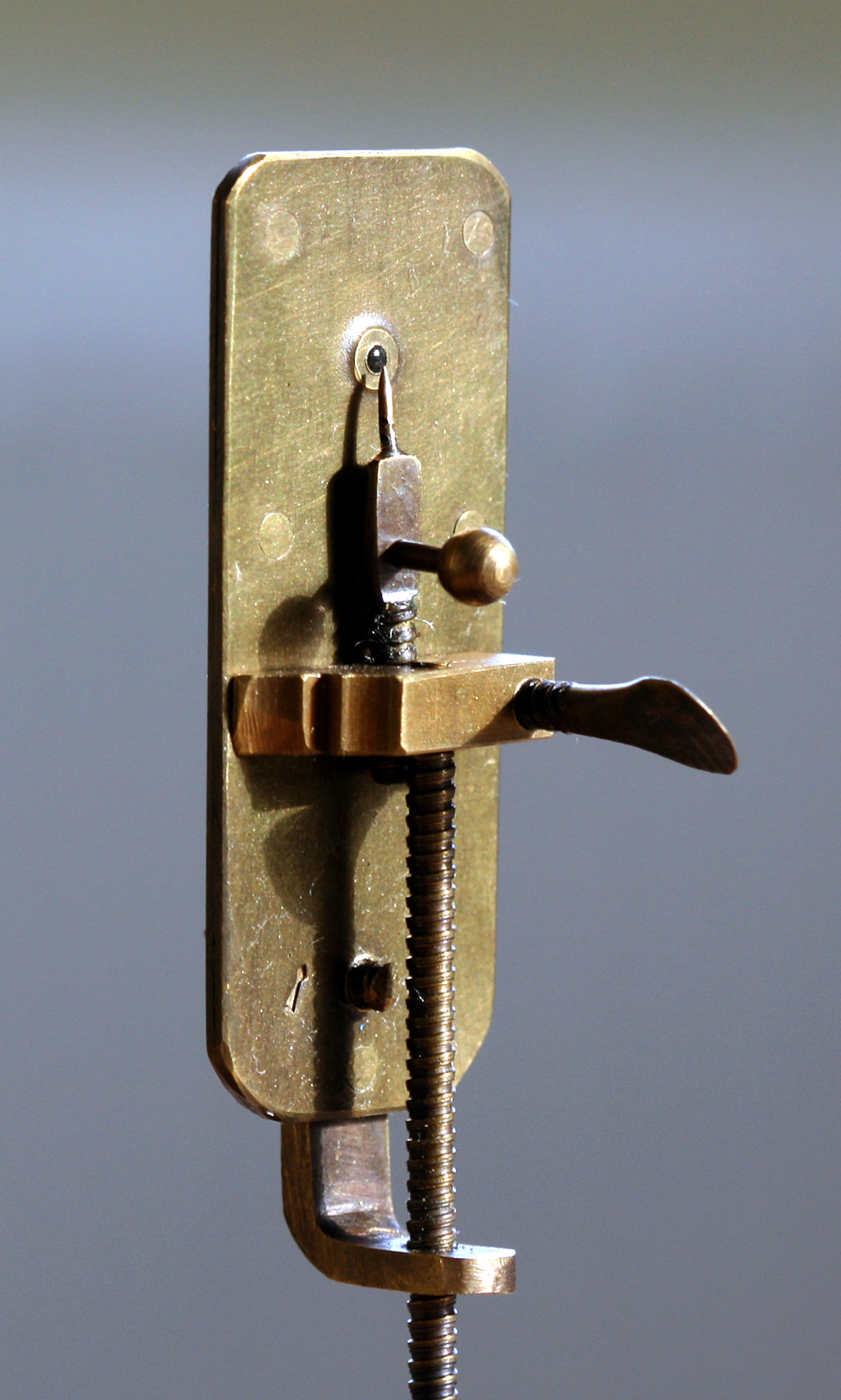
A replica of a microscope by Van Leeuwenhoek

== Legacy and recognition ==
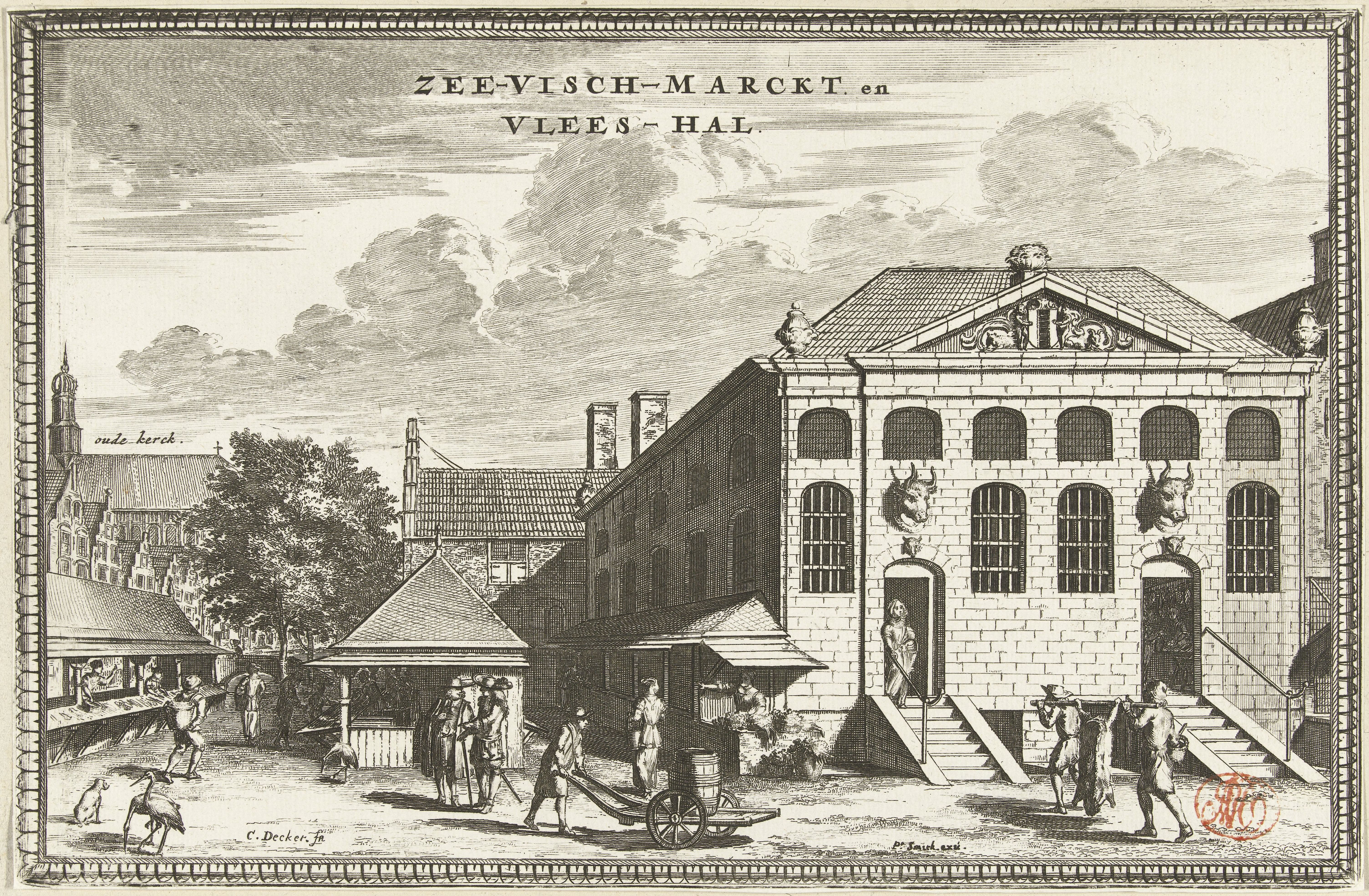
View on Fish- and Meatmarket in Delft, opposite of Van Leeuwenhoek's house

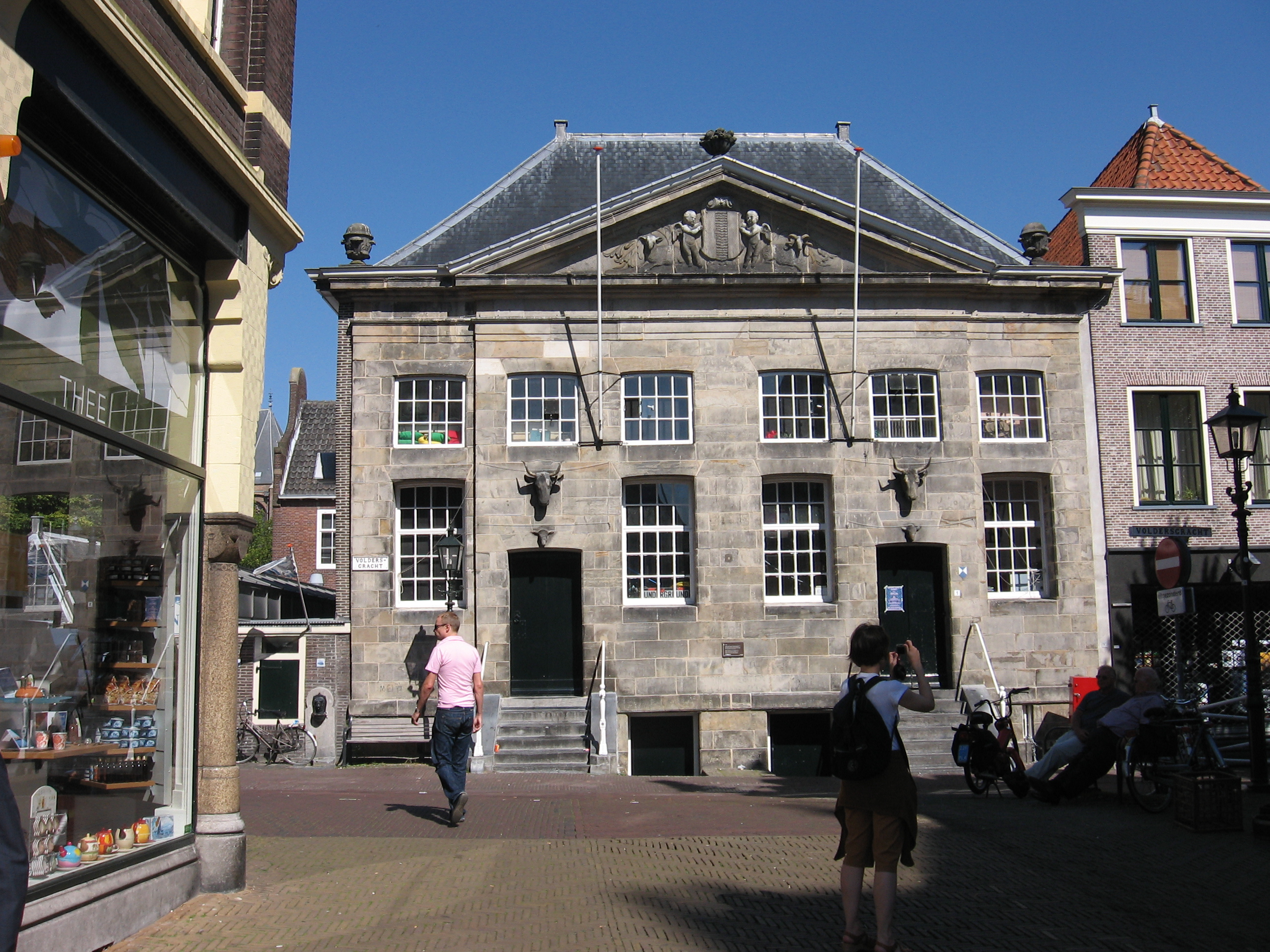
Vleeshal Delft

By the end of his life, Van Leeuwenhoek had written approximately 560 letters to the Royal Society and other scientific institutions concerning his observations and discoveries. Even during the last weeks of his life, Van Leeuwenhoek continued to send letters full of observations to London. The last few contained a precise description of his own illness. He suffered from a rare disease, an uncontrolled movement of the midriff, which now is named Van Leeuwenhoek's disease. He died at the age of 90, on 26 August 1723, and was buried four days later in the Oude Kerk in Delft.

In 1981, the British microscopist Brian J. Ford found that Van Leeuwenhoek's original specimens had survived in the collections of the Royal Society of London. They were found to be of high quality, and all were well preserved. Ford carried out observations with a range of single-lens microscopes, adding to our knowledge of Van Leeuwenhoek's work. In Ford's opinion, Leeuwenhoek remained imperfectly understood, the popular view that his work was crude and undisciplined at odds with the evidence of conscientious and painstaking observation. He constructed rational and repeatable experimental procedures and was willing to oppose received opinion, such as spontaneous generation, and he changed his mind in the light of evidence.

On his importance in the history of microbiology and science in general, the British biochemist Nick Lane wrote that he was "the first even to think of looking—certainly, the first with the power to see." His experiments were ingenious, and he was "a scientist of the highest calibre", attacked by people who envied him or "scorned his unschooled origins", not helped by his secrecy about his methods.

The Antoni van Leeuwenhoek Hospital in Amsterdam, named after Van Leeuwenhoek, is specialized in oncology. In 2004, a public poll in the Netherlands to determine the greatest Dutchman ("De Grootste Nederlander") named Van Leeuwenhoek the 4th-greatest Dutchman of all time.

On 24 October 2016, Google commemorated the 384th anniversary of Van Leeuwenhoek's birth with a Doodle that depicted his discovery of "little animals" or animalcules, now known as unicellular organisms.

The Leeuwenhoek Medal, Leeuwenhoek Lecture, Leeuwenhoek crater, Leeuwenhoeckia, Levenhookia (a genus in the family Stylidiaceae), Leeuwenhoekiella (an aerobic bacterial genus), and the scientific publication Antonie van Leeuwenhoek: International Journal of General and Molecular Microbiology are named after him.

As a fictional character, he appears as a flea circus owner, microscopist and magician in E.T.A. Hoffmann's novel Master Flea, together with Jan Swammerdam.

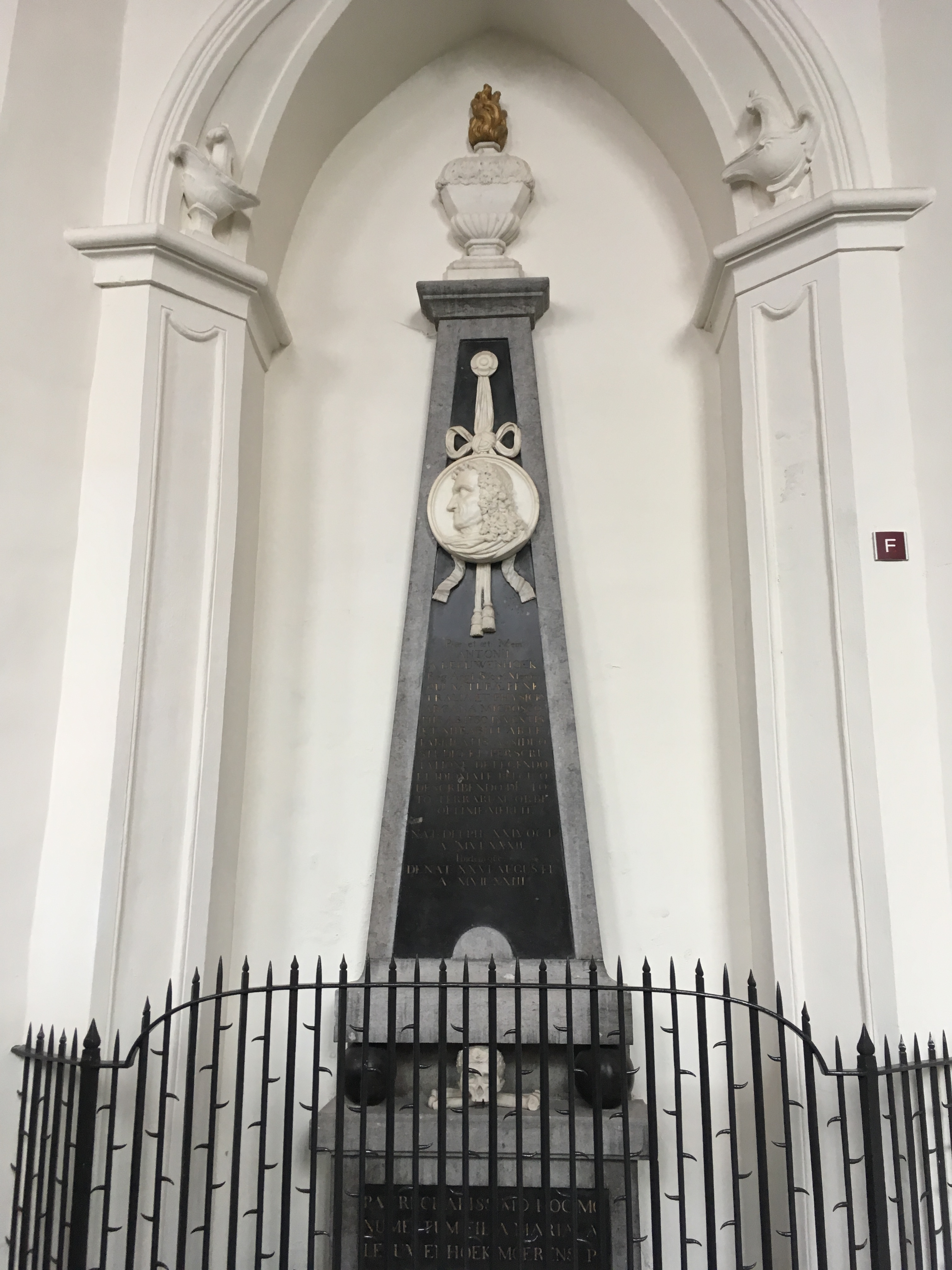
Memorial of Antonie van Leeuwenhoek in the Oude Kerk in Delft

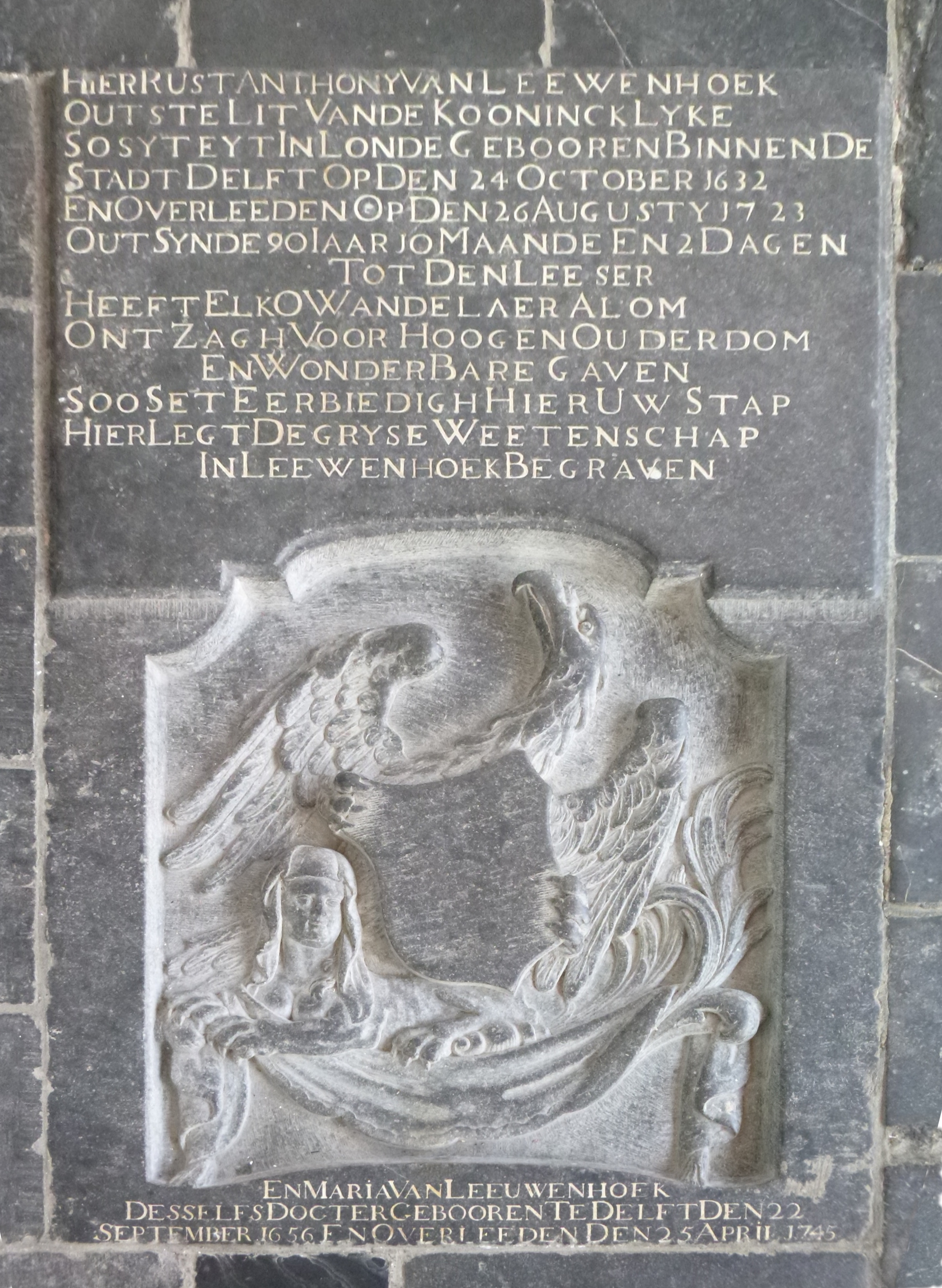
Antonie van Leeuwenhoek is buried in the Oude Kerk.

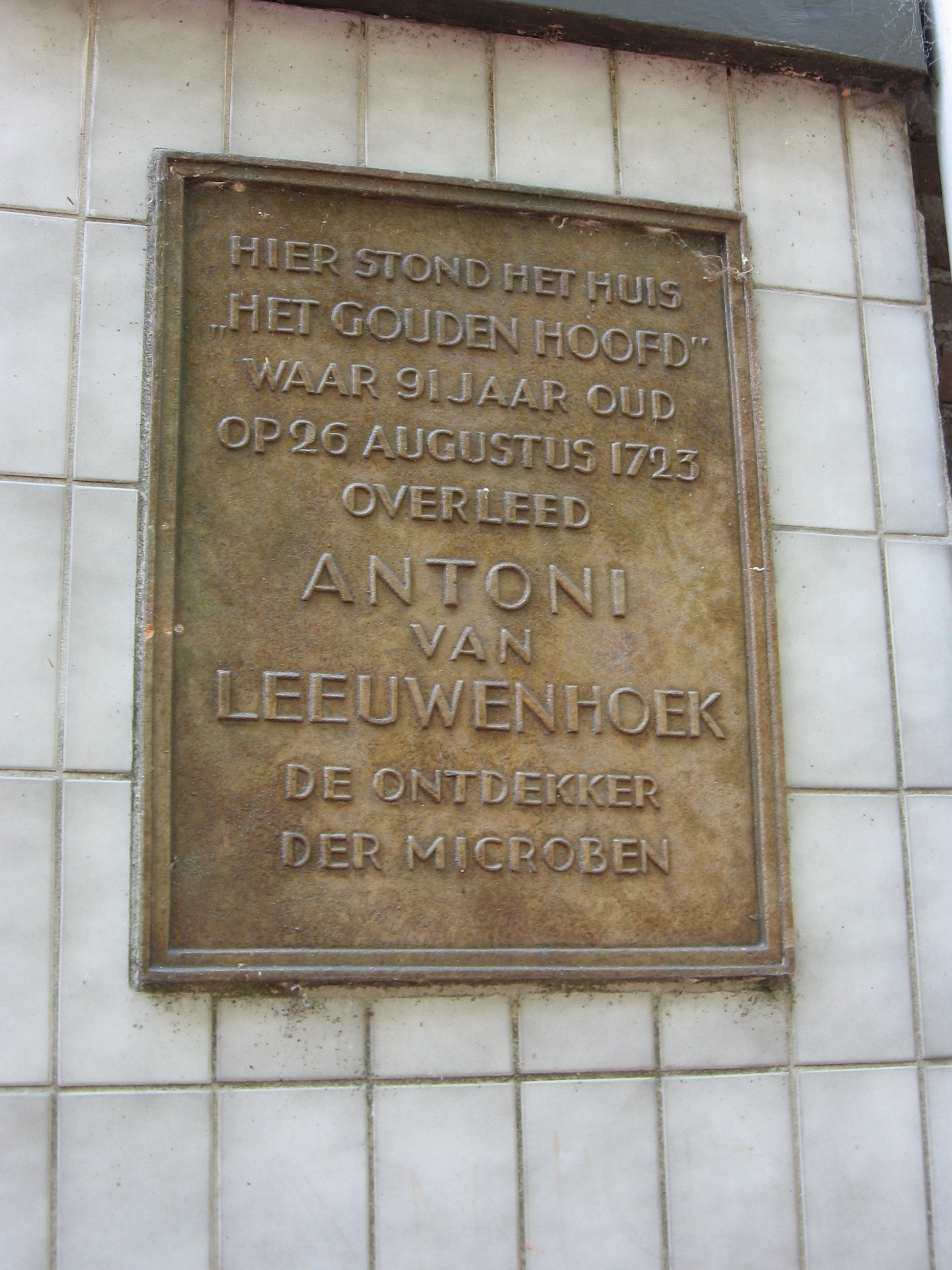
Het Gouden Hoofd (Hippolytusbuurt 1–3, Delft)

== See also ==
- Animalcule
- Regnier de Graaf
- Dutch Golden Age
- History of microbiology
- Microscopy
- Microscope
- Robert Hooke
- Microscopic discovery of microorganisms
- Microscopic scale
- Science and technology in the Dutch Republic
- Scientific Revolution
- Nicolas Steno
- Jan Swammerdam
- Timeline of microscope technology
- Johannes Vermeer

== Sources ==
- Cobb, Matthew: Generation: The Seventeenth-Century Scientists Who Unraveled the Secrets of Sex, Life, and Growth. (US: Bloomsbury, 2006) ISBN 9781596910362
- Cobb, Matthew: The Egg and Sperm Race: The Seventeenth-Century Scientists Who Unlocked the Secrets of Sex and Growth. (London: Simon & Schuster, 2006)
- Davids, Karel: The Rise and Decline of Dutch Technological Leadership: Technology, Economy and Culture in the Netherlands, 1350–1800 [2 vols.]. (Brill, 2008, ISBN 978-9004168657)
- Dobell, Clifford (1960) [1932]. Antony van Leeuwenhoek and His "Little Animals": being some account of the father of protozoology and bacteriology and his multifarious discoveries in these disciplines (Dover Publications ed.). New York: Harcourt, Brace and Company.
- Ford, Brian J. (1991). The Leeuwenhoek Legacy. Bristol and London: Biopress and Farrand Press.
- Ford, Brian J.: Single Lens: The Story of the Simple Microscope. (London: William Heinemann, 1985, 182 pp)
- Ford, Brian J.: The Revealing Lens: Mankind and the Microscope. (London: George Harrap, 1973, 208 pp)
- Fournier, Marian: The Fabric of Life: The Rise and Decline of Seventeenth-Century Microscopy (Johns Hopkins University Press, 1996, ISBN 978-0801851384)
- Huerta, Robert (2003). Giants of Delft: Johannes Vermeer and the Natural Philosophers: The Parallel Search for Knowledge during the Age of Discovery. Pennsylvania: Bucknell University Press.
- Moll, Warnar (2003). "Antonie van Leeuwenhoek". Onderzoeksportal [Research Portal]. University of Amsterdam. Archived from the original on 18 February 2004. "[Referring to Valk (1745)] Indeed, in this publication "Geneeskundig Verhaal van de Algemeene Loop-ziekte..." the author uses the work of Leeuwenhoek in describing the disease, draws some (preliminary) conclusions about the cause of the disease, he warns "non-believers of Van Leeuwenhoek to use a magnifying glass" and gives commentaries on the work of Anthonie van Leeuwenhoek and his findings."
- Payne, Alma Smith (1970). The Cleere Observer: A biography of Antoni van Leeuwenhoek. London: Macmillan.
- Ratcliff, Marc J.: The Quest for the Invisible: Microscopy in the Enlightenment. (Ashgate, 2009, 332 pp)
- Robertson, Lesley; Backer, Jantien et al.: Antoni van Leeuwenhoek: Master of the Minuscule. (Brill, 2016, ISBN 978-9004304284)
- Ruestow, Edward G (1996). The Microscope in the Dutch Republic: The Shaping of Discovery. New York: Cambridge University Press.
- Snyder, Laura J. (2015). Eye of the Beholder: Johannes Vermeer, Antoni van Leeuwenhoek, and the Reinvention of Seeing. New York: W. W. Norton & Company.
- Struik, Dirk J.: The Land of Stevin and Huygens: A Sketch of Science and Technology in the Dutch Republic during the Golden Century (Studies in the History of Modern Science). (Springer, 1981, 208 pp)
- Valk, Evert (1745). Een geneeskundig verhaal van de algemeene loop-ziekte, die te Kampen en in de om-geleegene streeken heeft gewoed in 't jaar 1736 neevens een werktuigkunstige, en natuurkundige beschryvinge van de oorzaak, uitwerking en genezinge waar in word aan-getoond, dat dezelve, waarschynlyk, door bloed-loose diertjes, beschreven in de werken van Anthony van Leeuwenhoek, het werd te weeg gebragt, en door kwik voor-naamentlyk, uit-geroeid [A work on a disease in the city of Kampen in 1736 caused by "little animals". These bloodless animals are most likely the little animals described in the work of Leeuwenhoek and they can be killed by treatment of mercury] (in Dutch). Haarlem: Van der Vinne. p. 97.
- Wilson, Catherine: The Invisible World: Early Modern Philosophy and the Invention of the Microscope. (Princeton University Press, 1997, ISBN 978-0691017099)
- de Kruif, Paul (1926). "I Leeuwenhoek: First of the Microbe Hunters". Microbe Hunters. Blue Ribbon Books. New York: Harcourt Brace & Company Inc. pp. 3–24.
