= Floe (disambiguation) =

An ice floe is a moving pack of rafts of ice.

Floe may also refer to:

== Places ==
- Floe Peak, Kootenay National Park, British Columbia, Canada; a mountain in the Canadian Rockies
- Floe Lake, Kootenay National Park, British Columbia, Canada; a lake
- Floe, West Virginia, US; an unincorporated community in Clay County

== People ==
- First Lady of Ethiopia (FLOE)
- Floé Kühnert (born 1984), German pole vaulter
- Edgar Allen Floe (born 1978), American hiphop artist

=== Fictional characters ===
- Floe, a character from the anime series Simoun

== Other uses ==
- "Floe", a movement from the 1981 Philip Glass composition Glassworks
- Southern Floe, a Southern-class whaler

== See also ==
- Phloe, a 2015 album by Thaneth Warakulnukroh
- Flow (disambiguation)
- Flou (disambiguation)
- Floh (disambiguation)
- Flo (disambiguation)
