= Continuity (broadcasting) =

Announcements, messages and graphics between broadcast programmes

In broadcasting, continuity or presentation (or station break in the U.S. and Canada) is announcements, messages and graphics played by the broadcaster between specific programmes. It typically includes programme schedules, announcement of the programme immediately following and trailers or descriptions of forthcoming programmes. Continuity can be spoken by an announcer or displayed in text over graphics. On television continuity generally coincides with a display of the broadcaster's logo or ident. Advertisements are generally not considered part of continuity because they are advertising another company.

A continuity announcer is a broadcaster whose voice (and, in some cases, face) appears between radio or television programmes to give programme information. Continuity announcers tell viewers and listeners which channel they are watching or listening to at the moment (or which station they are tuned to), what they are about to see (or hear), and what they could be watching (or listening to) if they changed to a different channel operated by the broadcaster. At the end of programmes, they may read out information about the previous programme, for example who presented and produced it, relay information or merchandise relating to the show, or to provide details of organisations who may offer support in relation to a storyline or issue raised in the programme. Continuity announcers may also play music during intervals and give details of programmes later in the day. If there is a breakdown, they make any necessary announcements and often play music for its duration.

== Usage ==
=== Television ===
Television continuity announcements typically take one of two forms:

- Out-of-vision, where only the announcer's voice is heard, either over the end sequence of a programme or on-screen graphics. With appropriate training in sound and vision mixing, this can be achieved with a single person acting as both voice and controller.
- In-vision, where the announcer is seen delivering the announcement on-screen. This typically requires a number of people in a small studio, including sound engineers, vision mixers, and occasionally camera operators. Modern installations with motorised cameras can reduce this to two – the presenter, and a technical assistant to perform the "backstage" functions such as adjusting the camera and mixing. Typically, in-vision announcers are utilised today in smaller television markets, usually where private commercial channels were introduced late.

Currently, the following European television channels use in-vision announcers:

- Finland: YLE TV1 (until March 23, 2025)
- France: TV5Monde
- Ireland: TG4
- Norway: NRK1
- United Kingdom: CBeebies and BBC Alba

=== Radio ===
With most radio stations now broadcasting only music, few networks retain continuity announcers. Exceptions include talk stations such as National Public Radio in the United States, BBC Radio 4 and in the UK and SR P1 in Sweden. In the case of Radio 4 they also read the shipping forecasts and gale warnings. Many also serve as newsreaders.

== Continuity around the world ==
=== Canada ===
In Canada, CBC Television used in-vision announcers to 'host' primetime programming from 2001 to 2006. As the credits rolled, the announcer would describe upcoming episodes of the series, then introduce the next program at the top of the hour. The evening's host changed daily. Usually, the host was appearing in a major upcoming program the same week, giving the appearance that the host is promoting not only the next program in the evening but his or her own upcoming show. Sometimes CBC Radio newscasters or program hosts would appear as the evening TV hosts. The initiative, sometimes known as "Hosted Prime", only covered the CBC's core evening block (8:00 to 10:00 p.m. local) as opposed to programs in the 7:00 hour, and would not normally appear during the summer.

CBC Radio One has used continuity announcers in recent years. Originally, a number of staff announcers shared the duties; however, in 2004, the service began employing actress Shauna MacDonald as its primary continuity announcer. Her identity remained a secret for more than a year, leading her to be dubbed "Promo Girl". MacDonald has since been replaced by Jeremy Harris, serving in a similar capacity for both Radio One and Radio 2.

Omni Television in Toronto has used in-vision continuity announcers for the past 10 years or so. These "interstitial" segments fill in the time left in programming due to the different break structure of American TV programming, that cannot be filled by commercials in Canada due to Canadian broadcast regulations regarding the number of minutes of commercials allowable per hour. The segments range from 30 seconds to 2 minutes, and in addition to announcing the station and the programs coming up, the announcers will talk about other programming, station contests, quirky news or celebrity gossip.

Continuity announcements on Citytv have been voiced by actor Dan Aykroyd and journalist Mark Dailey.

Other Canadian stations will fill this time in by a news update or a teaser about news stories.

=== Flanders, Belgium ===
Until July 2015, één, VRT's main television station in the Flanders region of Belgium, used a team of four staff announcers, who performed in-vision and out-of-vision continuity links. VRT's children's station, Ketnet, also utilised in-vision continuity with announcing staff known on-air as Ketnetwrappers.

Vtm, the main commercial television channel in Flanders, uses live out-of-vision announcers. The station utilised in-vision continuity until January 2008. vtm's sister station, 2BE, only utilises pre-recorded voiceovers.

Both of SBS Belgium's television stations, VIER and VIJF no longer use any continuity announcers following the rebranding of the networks from VT4 and VIJFtv.

=== China ===
CCTV had offered in-vision continuity. However, this kind of segment has been withdrawn in recent years.

=== Germany ===
In German television, in-vision continuity was used until the mid-1990s. In-vision continuity announcers are known in German as Ansager for a male announcer or Ansagerin for a female announcer. Some stations still use pre-recorded voiceovers, or use voiceovers for promos only.

=== Ireland ===
All domestic terrestrial channels in Ireland make use of continuity announcers, mainly to introduce programmes, promote forthcoming programmes, provide information relating to the programme just broadcast and, in the case of stations with sister channels, cross-promote programmes on the other channel (such as linking between RTÉ One and Two, or TV3 and 3e).

RTÉ One used in-vision continuity on a regular basis until August 1995 and briefly reprieved the practice during the Christmas holidays and for overnight programmes in the late 1990s.

RTÉ Two used in-vision continuity announcers from its launch in November 1978 until shortly before the channel relaunched as Network 2 a decade later. In-vision links were reprised on the channel, during the evening schedule, from 1997 to 2001.

From January 2008, the daytime schedule on TV3 launched with two new in-vision continuity announcers, Conor Clear and Andrea Hayes.

TG4 makes regular use of in-vision continuity during its evening schedule. The station's announcers also present weather forecasts in-vision, and often mention forthcoming programmes during the weather bulletins.

=== Italy ===
Continuity announcers appeared in-vision on the three main RAI channels, where female continuity announcers are known as signorine buonasera (or 'good evening ladies'), until 31 May 2016, although by that time, their role was much more marginal than it used to be. Past continuity announcers such as Nicoletta Orsomando or Rosanna Vaudetti are regarded today as cultural icons of the 1960s, particularly because of their impeccable elegance and perfect pronunciation of Italian. From 2003 until 2016, all in-vision links on Rai 1, Rai 2 and Rai 3 had been pre-recorded by a smaller team of station announcers.

Rai 1

- Claudia Andreatti
- Elisa Silvestrin

Rai 2

- Alessandra Canale

Rai 3

- Alessia Patacconi
- Sarita Agnes Rossi

Other Italian channels such as Retequattro, Canale 5 and Italia 1 also used their own team of signorine buonasera in the 1980s and 1990s.

=== Japan ===
In Japan, continuity segments on most TV stations are done by airing a program specifically for program promotion which is called (番宣番組; bansen bangumi) which airs for a few minutes or longer. They are produced by the stations themselves and air at certain periods of the day and act as program fillers. The station's announcers present the program and introduce its upcoming programs on the station by airing clips from the program or air a promo. Some of the bansen bangumi are NHK Premap on NHK.

=== USSR and Russia ===
Soviet Central Television widely used in-vision continuity announcers (which were usually called diktor, can be translated as announcer or speaker) between programmes to tell the viewers about forthcoming programmes, changes in the schedule, or to read the whole schedule for the remainder of current day or for the next day. After USSR collapse, Soviet TV succeeding networks Channel One Russia, Russia 1, 2x2 also used in-vision continuity announcers until 1995, but then they all decided to reduce their announcer departments, and replace continuities with on-screen graphics and textual messages. Some local TV stations, mainly regional representatives of VGTRK, used in-vision continuity announcers further, until early 2000s, but also replaced them with different types of on-screen messages.

=== North Korea ===
Korean Central Television still offers in-vision continuity.

=== Sweden ===
In Sweden, a continuity announcer (or programme presenter) is informally known as a hallåa, which roughly means "helloer". This comes from the early days of radio when the main station in Stockholm contacted the other stations around the country by calling "hallå, hallå". Continuity announcers have been present on Swedish public television since November 1957. Initially, Sveriges Radio employed a team of both male and female announcers, but in the 1960s, the announcers became almost solely female, something that became the tongue-in-cheek topic of Gyllene Tider's breakthrough hit single "Flickorna på TV2" (1979). Male announcers returned in the 1970s.

Both Kanal 1 and TV2, as well as the educational television service UR, continued to use in-vision announcers from the 1970s through to the 1990s, except for a few years in the early nineties when Kanal 1 (now SVT1) switched to out-of-vision continuity. In a cost-cutting exercise, SVT decided to drop live in-vision announcing from SVT2 in January 2005 and introduced pre-recorded voice-overs by SVT's announcing staff. The educational broadcaster UR dropped in-vision announcers by the end of 2006. A further review of SVT presentation led to the end of in-vision continuity on SVT1 on Sunday 4 March 2012. All SVT stations now use out-of-vision announcers.

The largest commercial channel, TV4 has utilised in-vision announcers since it began broadcasting in 1990. Most other commercial channels broadcast from London and use out-of-vision announcers. Private channels with out-of-vision announcers include TV3, Kanal 5, TV6, Kanal 9 and TV4 Plus.

=== Southeast Asia ===
Today, in-vision announcers are used in Southeast Asia, especially in Cambodia and Vietnam.

This list is Southeast Asian channels still using in-vision announcers:

- Cambodia: TV3 (program menu also used), TV5 (military announcer)
- Laos: Lao National Television (not used as usual)
- Thailand: TV7, TV3 (Program menu also used, After 2011 Program menu appears at right of announcer.), TV5
- Vietnam: Bình Thuận Television

In Singapore, these often appeared in pre-recorded filmlets at start-up and closedown; largely to the latter, this led to the term "good-night girls" (most were female, very few were male). Initially, the closing announcements were done live, but later moved to a pre-recorded format. Each filmlet had four announcers, in Malay, Mandarin, Tamil and English. These were ditched in early 1991, being replaced by a CGI animation.

=== Taiwan ===
Pre-recorded continuity announcements are offered on the TV channels in Taiwan.

=== United Kingdom ===
Continuity announcers are frequently used in the United Kingdom. In general, continuity announcers are broadcast live on terrestrial television channels (BBC One, etc.), whereas pre-recorded announcements are used most of the time on digital and satellite channels.

=== United States ===
Not all major networks use continuity, although ABC uses pre-recorded continuity for prime time broadcasts, and most of the continuity announcements are usually those in the middle of programs. From the late 1970s until the mid-1990s, Ernie Anderson was known as "The Voice of ABC-TV" and served as the promotional voice and continuity announcer for the network. None of the major networks use in-vision continuity. Most of the continuity announcements are usually recorded for promos for upcoming programs while some are placed before an upcoming program. Since the mid-1990s, it has also been common for networks to place trailers promoting upcoming programs during the preceding program's credits (known in some circles as "generic credits", "split-screen credits", "squeezed credits" or "credit crunch"). In most cases, networks and TV stations do not give out any information about the next program and would go straight to it without any introduction. In addition to showing promotional content for upcoming programs and those about the program (such as showing a preview on the upcoming episode of a preceding program), most stations with a newscast also show a brief promotion of upcoming newscasts, some of which would be broadcast directly from the news studio itself.

Some PBS member stations and networks, most notably WNET during the 1980s, also use continuity announcers although continuity in the present day is either pre-recorded or retired in favor of promotions for other programs in between programs.

== See also ==
- Bumper music, a similarly functioning idea used in talk radio in the United States
- Clock ident
- Copywriting
- Flow (television)
- Voice-tracking
