= Flo, Texas =

Unincorporated community in Texas, US

Coordinates: 31°25′06″N 95°54′47″W

Flo is an unincorporated community in Leon County, Texas. It is located about 12 miles from Centerville.

== History ==
Flo, which has been named many different names, including Kidd's Mill, Wheelock, Bethlehem, Oneta, New Hope, Oden, Odens, Flo's Folly, Lone Star, and Midway, was founded by Thaddeus Kidd in 1855, well before the American Civil War, where he founded and built a mill. A post office was started that same year and was open until 1868. However, the town was given hope as another post office was built there in 1880, but that hope quickly diminished that year, as the post office was once again shut down. But once again, another post office was built up again, this time as Odens from 1885 to 1891. The town was changed to Flo, the name it is known to locals today (if there is any), where it had the same ladder post office until 1930. The name Flo came from the name of the then-postmaster's dog. Today, any mail that goes to the Flo area is managed by the postmasters of the nearby town of Buffalo.

== Education ==
The traces of the fine education system in Flo, Texas, can be traced back to the years before the Civil War (probably when or shortly after Mr. Kidd founded the town), back when the town was known as Kidd's Mill. That school lasted until 1927, when it was replaced by a consolidated school, known then as Lone Star, although some local residents referred to the school as Flo or Flo's Folly, where it served students in Flo as well as the nearby towns of Midway and Russel. Unfortunately, the school burned, and in 1986, the school district was discontinued. Today, the town of Flo is served by the Buffalo Independent School District, although one source claims Oakwood Independent School District picks up students in the area.
