= Antonie van Leeuwenhoek (journal) =

- Discipline: Microbiology
- Language: English
- Edited by: Jia Liu

Publication details
- History: 1934–present
- Publisher: Springer Science+Business Media
- Frequency: Monthly
- Impact factor: 1.8 (2024)

Standard abbreviations
- ISO 4: Antonie van Leeuwenhoek

Indexing
- CODEN: ALJMAO
- ISSN: 0003-6072 (print); 1572-9699 (web)
- LCCN: sn86012330
- OCLC no.: 221740919

Links
- Journal homepage; Online access

Antonie van Leeuwenhoek is a peer-reviewed scientific journal covering microbiology published by Springer Science+Business Media. The journal was established in 1934 and is published monthly. The editor-in-chief is Jia Liu. The journal is named after Antonie van Leeuwenhoek, considered the father of microbiology.

== Abstracting and indexing ==
The journal is abstracted and indexed in the following bibliographic databases:

- Aquatic Sciences and Fisheries Abstracts
- Biological Abstracts
- BIOSIS Previews
- CAB Abstracts
- Current Contents/Life Sciences
- Embase
- Food Science & Technology Abstracts
- Index Medicus/MEDLINE/PubMed
- Science Citation Index
- Scopus

According to the Journal Citation Reports, the journal has a 2024 impact factor of 1.8.
