= Flo Perkins =

American artist

Flo Perkins (born 1951) is an American glass artist currently working and residing in the Pojoaque Valley north of Santa Fe, New Mexico. Her work can be found in several museum collections including the Corning Museum of Glass, the Los Angeles County Museum of Art, the Albuquerque Museum and the Racine Art Museum as well as numerous public and private collections.

== Early life ==
She received her Bachelor of Arts from the Philadelphia College of Art (1974), Master of Arts from the University of California, Los Angeles (1981), and she studied under renowned Italian master glass blower Lino Tagliapietra.

== Career ==
In the 1970s Perkins was one of a small group of female artisan glass blowers. In the 1980s Perkins built her own glass studio in Pojoaque, New Mexico where she worked on learning Venetian glassblowing techniques. She further refined her glass making technique while studying with the Murano glass master Lino Tagliapietra.

While living in New Mexico in the 1980s and 1990s she studied botanical forms including cacti, flower buds and bouquets and began incorporating those forms into her work. In the 1990s she began incorporating bronze, steel bars and iron into her glass work to create larger works including lattices, wreaths, swags and bouquets.

By the early 21st century Perkins had mastered her glassblowing technique and become known for her creation of brightly colored botanical sculptures created using Italian techniques including murrina, reticello and granulare. She also built her fourth hot shop on her estate located 20 miles north of Santa Fe, New Mexico.

Perkin's work has been displayed at Habatat Galleries in Pontiac, Michigan, Addison Arts, Santa Fe, New Mexico, Traver Sutton Gallery in Seattle, Washington, The Elliot Brown Gallery in Seattle, Washington, Imago Galleries in Palm Desert, California, Cline Lewallen Galleries in Santa Fe, New Mexico, Tagliapietra and Dante Marioni at Galleria Marina Barovier in Venice, Italy, and at The Corning Museum of Glass, in Corning, New York.

In addition to her glass work, Perkins has taught at the Pilchuck Glass School, San Jose State University, and the University of California, San Diego.
