= Flou =

Paraguayan rock band

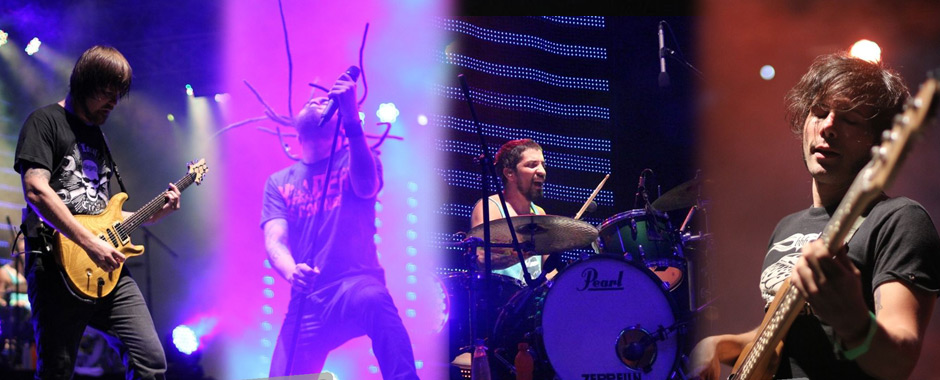
- Walter Cabrera, Bruno Ferreiro, Federico Wagener and Guillermo Gayo

Background information
- Origin: Asunción, Paraguay
- Genres: Nu metal; alternative rock
- Years active: 2000–present
- Members: Walter Cabrera; Bruno Ferreiro; Federico Wagener; Guillermo Gayo
- Website: flou.com.py

Flou is a Paraguayan alternative rock/nu metal band from Asunción, formed in 1997. They are one of the most popular and successful rock bands from Paraguay.

== History ==
The band was formed in 1997 by a group of friends; throughout the years the band went through several changes in line-up and music style that culminated in the year 2000 with the shaping and establishment of the original band. In 2001 the band released its first demo titled Despertar (Awakening) with five songs. The public's response was immediate, as the demo sold out immediately. This success led the band to sign with Paraguayan record label Kamikaze Records.

In 2003 the band recorded and released its first album, Ataraxia. This album was a success and by the end of the year Flou was chosen as the "Best Paraguayan band of the year" by the Rock & Pop FM radio station. Their second single, "Delirio", reached the top of the charts alongside their third single "Ansias". In 2004 the band won the "Luis Alberto del Paraná" award as the best rock band in Paraguay. The success for the band continued in 2005 and 2006 where they participated in the popular Pilsen Rock festival in Asunción where they played in front of a crowd of 85,000 people.

Their second album was released at the end of 2006. In April 2010, they released their third album, Tanto y Nada. Between this year and 2021 two further albums were released, Universo inverso and Encuentros únicos.

== Members ==
- Walter Cabrera – vocals, guitar
- Bruno Ferreiro – guitar
- Federico Wagener – bass
- Guillermo Gayo – drums

=== Former members ===
- Ariel Insfrán – guitar (2000/2002)
- Ariel Sandoval – drums (1997/2006)

== Discography ==
- Despertar (2001, Demo, Independent)
- Tacito (2006, LP, Independent)
- Tanto y Nada (2010, LP, Independent)
- Universo inverso (2015, LP)
- Encuentros únicos (2021, LP)
