= Flow (television) =

How TV channels try to hold their audience

In television programming, flow is how channels and networks try to hold their audience from program to program, or from one segment of a program to another. Thus, it is the flow of television material from one element to the next. The term is also significant in television studies, the academic analysis of the medium. Media scholar Raymond Williams is responsible for first using the term in this sense. He emphasized that flow is "the defining characteristic of broadcasting, simultaneously as a technology and as a cultural form." "It is evident that what is now called 'an evening's viewing' is in some ways planned by providers and then by viewers as a whole; that it is in any event planned in discernible sequences which in this sense override particular program units". Williams argued that ads glued programs together which created the sense of television flow with a shift "from the concept of sequence as programming to the concept of flow."

Since the 1990s, the concept of flow has been transformed by new technologies and programming strategies that free the viewer from the old television model. VCRs, DVDs, DVRs (such as TiVo), Video-on-Demand, and online video sources all allow the viewer to construct their own flow. They are no longer limited to a choice of a small number of networks, as they were in the 1950s–1970s. Consequently, the concept of provider-planned flow is dying out and may not survive beyond the broadcast era of television.

== Production and purpose ==
Williams claims that flow is determined by television's "stage of development," but Rick Altman, Professor of Cinemas and Comparative Literature at the University of Iowa, argues that the culture of the medium produces and determines its flow. He notes that the soundtrack is unique to American culture and is one of the techniques that shapes the viewer's flow or his or her experience watching television. He notes that the soundtrack provides the viewer with sufficient plot, cues important events by sound (sound advance, e.g. clapping before it is seen on screen), and creates continuity. These sonic elements create an intermittent flow of television. The goal is not to get the viewers to watch carefully, but to keep them from turning the television off.

== See also ==
- Continuity (broadcasting)

== Sources ==
- Williams, Raymond (1974). Television: Technology and Cultural Form. London: Fontana.
