= Flo Gennaro =

Argentine fashion model (born 1991)

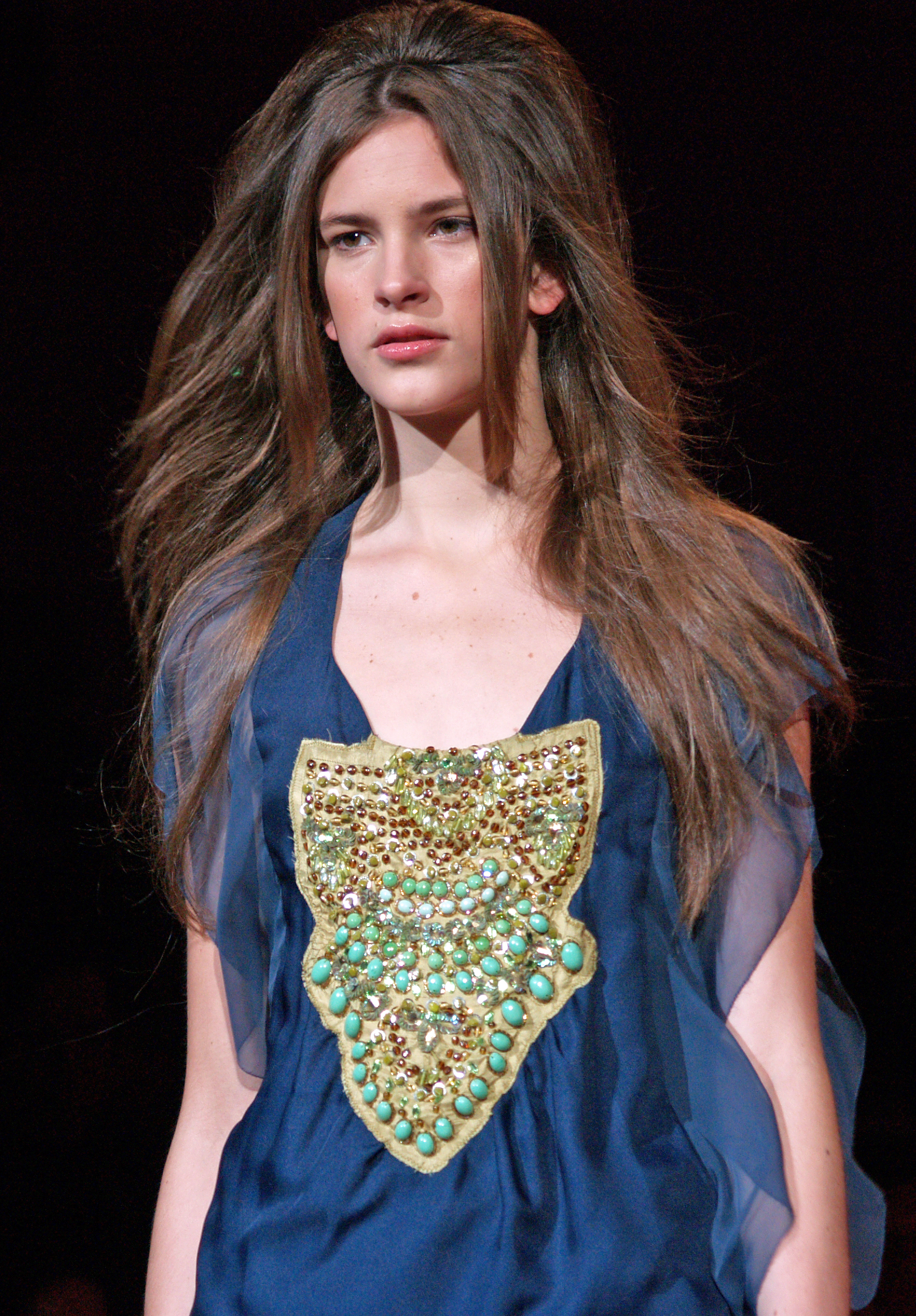
- Gennaro at Custo Barcelona Spring 2009 show
- Born: January 9, 1991 (age 34); Rosario, Argentina
- Modeling information
- Height: 6 ft; 1.83 m
- Hair color: Light Brown
- Eye color: Brown

Flo Gennaro (born January 9, 1991 in Rosario, Santa Fe) is an Argentine fashion model. She has modeled for Ann Demeulemeester, Chaiken, Christian Dior, Costello Tagliapietra, Doo.Ri, Lanvin, Louis Vuitton, Marni, and Nina Ricci and has appeared on the cover of D Magazine, Qvest, and Korean Vogue Girl. She was named one of the top 10 models of Spring 2008 by V magazine.
