= Berkarar =

Berkarar Shopping and Entertainment Centre
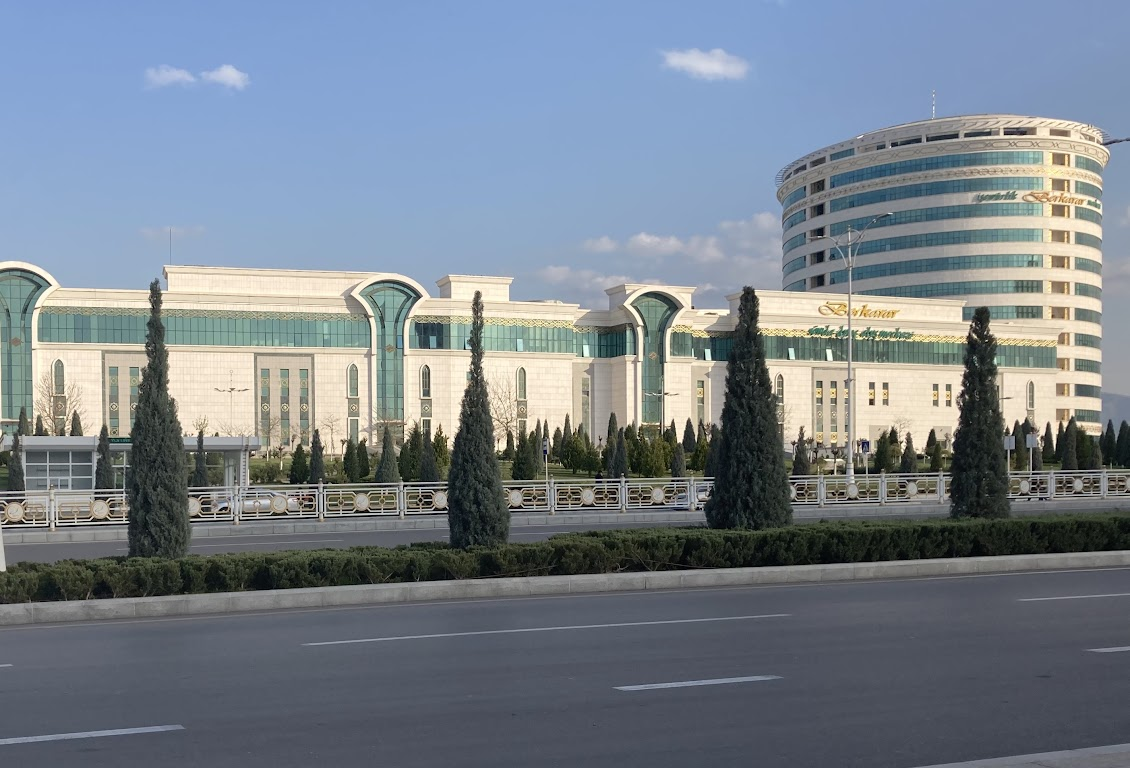
- Location: Ashgabat, Turkmenistan
- Address: 80 Ataturk St, Ashgabat 744000, Turkmenistan
- Opened: 26 December 2014
- Floors: 4
- Parking: 1,300 vehicles
- Website: www.berkarar.tm

The Berkarar Shopping and Entertainment Centre (Turkmen: Berkarar söwda we dynç alyş merkezi) is a modern shopping mall located at 80 Ataturk Street in the Ashgabat, Turkmenistan. Opened on 26 December 2014, Berkarar is the second largest shopping mall in Turkmenistan.

== History ==
The facility was built by the Union of Industrialists and Entrepreneurs of Turkmenistan.

The opening ceremony was held with the participation of President of Turkmenistan Gurbanguly Berdimuhamedov.
