= Master Flea =

1822 fairy tale by E. T. A. Hoffmann

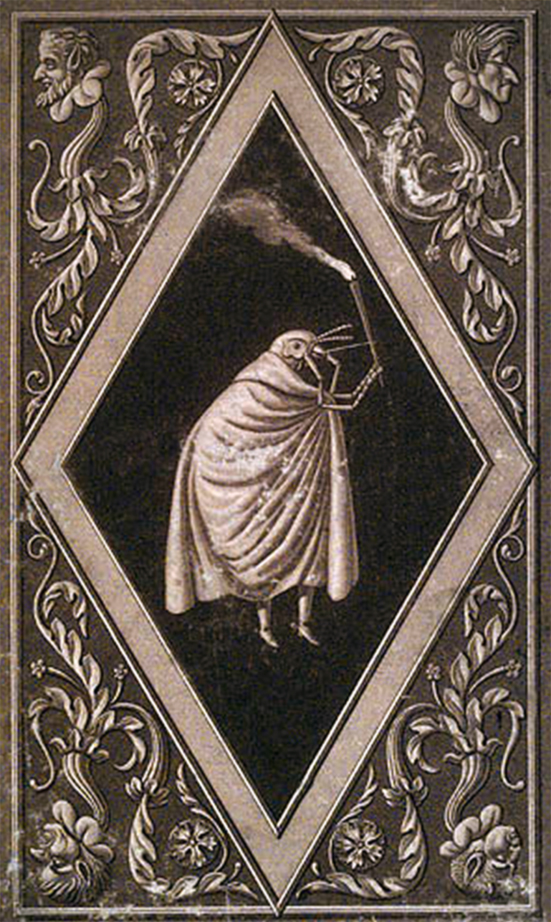
Master Flea with boots, robe and torch (2nd print, 1826)

Master Flea: A Fairy-Tale in Seven Adventures of Two Friends is a humorous fairytale fantasy novel by E. T. A. Hoffmann first published in 1822. Set in the city of Frankfurt am Main, the novel follows the story of Peregrinus Tyss, who becomes entangled in the conflict between supernatural characters in bourgeois form over Dörtje Elverdink, in reality Princess Gamaheh of Famagusta.

Shortly before its publication, the novel was the target of a major censorship case. In question were two scenes that appeared to mock the court system and its manner of prosecuting nationalists in the wake of the Carlsbad Decrees. The first edition appeared with significant portions of the fourth and fifth adventures missing. The missing sections were first made public by the literary scholar Georg Ellinger in 1906 in the journal Deutsche Rundschau, and appeared in a new version of the novel published in 1908. Because Hoffmann requested and agreed to the cuts, however, his final intentions for the novel remain unclear, and the novel should be regarded as a fragment.
