= Rosario Messina =

Italian businessman (1942–2011)

- Born: 1942; Aci Castello, Italy
- Died: 9 March 2011 (aged 68–69); Meda, Italy
- Occupation: Businessman

Rosario Messina (Aci Castello, December 1942 – Meda, 9 March 2011) was an Italian entrepreneur, who in 1978 founded the Italian company Flou, an avant-garde furniture manufacturer.

== Biography ==
Rosario Messina was born in 1942 in the Sicilian city of Aci Castello in 1942. His father – a farmer – died when he was a young man, leaving him the responsibility of the family. He was the eldest of five children and in 1958, he began working for the La Rinascente department store in Catania, first as an apprentice, then as a salesperson and finally as head of department.

Simultaneously, he attended evening courses in book-keeping and qualified in record time, managing to complete five academic years in one.

Following his experience with La Rinascente, he worked in the local branch of Zanussi-Rex, the most important Italian manufacturer of electrical appliances at that time.

In the early 1970s, he was asked to work in the furniture-design sector: he joined the company C&B (now B&B Italia) as an account officer for Sicily and Calabria. He then moved to the north of the country as the company's sales manager. In 1976, he started working with Cinova, another leading sofa manufacturing company. He was appointed as the sales manager, responsible for general management.

His professional turning point appeared when the soft furnishings company, Bassetti, assigned him a difficult task: he was asked to launch 'the duvet', a product to replace the traditional blanket for beds.

It was a difficult undertaking, and made more complex by the opposition from the furniture dealers – the elective distribution channel – who opposed commercializing a low cost product distributed through other channels. Messina had a Eureka moment and intuitively felt that 'bed with the duvet' as opposed to duvet alone would be an overwhelming success.

This ingenious idea led to the foundation of the company Flou in 1978 and the presentation of the bed 'Nathalie' designed by Vico Magistretti, an article that unquestionably was the prototype of a new design direction: the modern textile bed.

Flou rapidly built a reputation as a leader in the home furnishings industry for his work enhancing the global image of Italian design and is widely considered to be a pioneer in the 'culture of sleep'.

=== Official appointments ===
Between 1994 and 1998, Rosario Messina was President of the Gruppo Mobili Assarredo. From 1998, he was President of Assarredo, the trade association of Federlegno-Arredo that groups together the Italian furniture and furnishing industries. He was a member of the steering committee of the Council of Federlegno-Arredo, and was appointed to the same role with the industrial confederation Confindustria Monza e Brianza.

In 1999 he was appointed to the President of Cosmit, the organizing body for Milan Furniture Fair. The Salon was transformed into a meeting place for questions and answers as well as being a platform for 360° proposals in all areas of design culture and innovation.

The last edition under his management took place in 2011: a total of 321,320 people visited the event (up 7% on 2010 and 2% on 2009) and the 'Satellite Salon' that was actively promoted by Messina; this spin-off initiative started quietly and today is a stage for showcasing designers and architects from the specialist educational aspects around the world.

In June 2008, during the annual general meeting, Rosario Messina was elected President of Federlegno-Arredo, the organization of Confindustria that represents 2,300 companies in 12 associations (Assarredo [Furnishings], Assobagno [Bathrooms], Assoimballaggi [Packaging], Assolegno [Wood and Timber], Assoluce [Lighting], Assopannelli [Panels], Assufficio [Office], Edilegno [Timber houses], Fedecomlegno [The Italian National Timber Association], Asal Assoallestimenti [Stands and Layouts], Aippl [Wooden flooring and laying], Apil [Lighting]); these represent the entire section of timber-furnishings: from the raw materials to the finished product.

He was a councillor on the steering committee of the foundation 'Center for the development of Italo-Russian trade relations".

On 30 October 2008 the then-president of Confundustria, Emma Marcegaglia, appointed him as a delegate of the industrial confederation Confindustria and according to the constitution, he automatically held the position of Vice President of CFI (The Italian industrial confederation).

=== Prizes, awards and commendations ===
- 1996 "Industrialist of the Year" Awarded by the Group of Monza e Brianza Journalists during a ceremony hosted in the historical Palazzo Antona Traversi in Meda (Italy)
- 1997 "Official Commander of the Italian Republic"
- 1999 President of Cosmit – The organizing committee for the Milan Furniture Fair and the collateral events
- 2000 "Made in Italy Awards" – New York
- 2002 "26th Silver Jug" The city of Giarre, in Sicily. An award presented to Sicilians distinguished on the international stage.
- 2002 "Gold Medal for Industrial Merit" presented by the Industrial Association of Monza e Brianza
- 2002 "Paul Harris, Rotary Award for Entrepreneurship"

Reason: "Paul Harris 2002, the top award of the Rotary presented in recognition of a man who with commitment and determination led Flou to the leading position in the furnishing industry".

- 2002 "Entrepreneur of the Year" – The Ernst & Young Award

Reason: "For the "Innovation" Category, Rosario Messina was recognized for the most creative and innovative vision that marked a turning point in corporate living, for the revolutionary vision of the domestic environment and the transformation of the bedroom into a space to be enjoyed to the full, with modern original ideas, giving rise to a new culture for living and sleeping. The bed covers can be completely removed and replaced, and the innovative and highly comprehensive range of bedroom accessories identify Flou on the world stage. They kick-started a powerful innovative drive in the distribution of the sector, influencing the frequency of visits to the stores and affecting the methods of interaction with the clients".

- 2003 "Piazza Mercanti", An Award presented to Rosario Messina by the Milan Chamber of Commerce [Camera Commercio Industria Artigianato e Agricoltura di Milano], recognizing him as "An Entrepreneur distinguished for the innovations of process and product in his company".
- 2004 The prestigious Compasso d'Oro Award for his career presented by ADI, The Industrial Design Association – Triennale di Milano.
- 2004 Commander of the Order of Merit of the Italian Public (Commendatore dell'Ordine al merito della Repubblica Italiana) – an honor from the Italian President of the Republic
- 2005 "Honorary Citizen of the City of Meda"
- 2006 The Ambrogino d'oro Award – City Council of Milan – Cosmit presented the prize to its President Rosario Messina.
- 2007 8th edition of the National (Italy) Prize "Catania: Talenti e Dintorni" [Catania: Talents and Accessories] Fashion & Industry
- 2008 He was President of Federlegno-Arredo
- 2008 He was nominated "Grand Officers of the Order of Merit of the Italian Republic [Grande Ufficiale dell'Ordine al Merito della Repubblica Italiana]
- 2009 The President of the Italy, Giorgio Napolitano conferred the title of 'Knight for Labor' Cavaliere del Lavoro

== The "Rosario Messina" Foundation for Further Education ==
On 13 December 2013, with a decree issued by the General Council of the Lombardy Regional Government for Education, Training and Employment [Direzione Generale Istruzione, Formazione e Lavoro] approved and funded the project for the constitution of the new 'Rosario Messina Foundation for Further Education', and the definition of the course of study "Superior Technique for processes, products, communication and marketing for the Timber-Furnishing sectors" (Tecnico Superiore di processo, prodotto, comunicazione e marketing per il settore LegnoArredo).
