= List of continuity announcers in the United Kingdom =

This is a list of continuity announcers in the United Kingdom – the term "continuity announcer" is used for those broadcasters who provide the voiceovers between television/radio programmes.

The six pre-digital terrestrial television channels in the UK (BBC One, BBC Two, ITV, Channel 4, S4C and Channel 5) make use of continuity announcers, and for most of the time, continuity announcements are presented live. Continuity announcers can also be found on digital and satellite channels (but can be live at all times for most channels).

== Television ==
=== BBC ===
Station/Network	Announcers
BBC One/BBC Two Network	Dan Blake (freelancer), Lindsey Chapman (freelancer), Jenni Crane (freelancer), Jennie Cook (freelancer), Al Dupres (freelancer), Delroy Haynes (staff), Scott Hoatson (freelancer), Matthew Jackson (freelancer), David Johnson (freelancer), Anthony Lewis (freelancer), Dean Lydiate (staff), Maria Major (freelancer), Duncan Newmarch (staff), Peter Offer (freelancer), Nicola Phoenix (freelancer, BBC One), Alyson Slorach (staff), Sian Polhill-Thomas (freelancer), Phil Vowels (staff), Kate Walsh (freelancer), Ashleigh Whitfield (staff), Christie Reynolds (freelancer) Becky Wright (freelancer, BBC One)
BBC Scotland (BBC One/BBC Scotland)	Graham Anderson, Alison Cairney, Kirsty Campbell, Jennie Cook, Maura Currie, Jenny Farrish, Morag Irvine, Tamara Kennedy, Dominic Main, Cameron McKenna, Andrea McNeill, Ken Mitchell, Amanda Niven, John Phillips, George Taylor, Steve Urquhart, David Grant, Daniella Gualtieri.
BBC Alba	Moira MacDonald, Fiona MacKenzie, Kerry Anne MacLeod
BBC Cymru Wales (BBC One/BBC Two)	Josh Andrews (Freelancer), Tim Cooper, Danny Cowan, Al Dupres, Rachel Innes, Mark James (Freelancer), Julian Jones, Glyn Lewis, Geraint Pickard (Freelancer), Sally Richardson, Matt Rosser, Leanne Thomas, Dyfan Tudur, Eleanor Williams
BBC Northern Ireland (BBC One/BBC Two)	Aaron Alexander, Elaine Ayre, Jennie Browne, Paul Buckle, Tina Campbell, Kathy Clugston (freelancer), David Gordon, Gavin Healey, Michael Higgins, Jordan Humphries (freelancer), John Kerr (freelancer), Declan McConaghy (freelancer), Deirdre McConvey (freelancer), Kerry McLean (freelancer), Paul Reid, Michael Selby, Mark Simpson, Kerry Thompson (freelancer), Roy Willighan
BBC Three	Christie Reynolds, Ian Kay, Dan Blake, Louise Grayford, Arshia Riaz
BBC Four	Toni Green, David Vickery, Alyson Slorach, Dean Lydiate, Matthew Jackson, Kate Walsh
CBBC	Phil Fletcher (as Hacker T. Dog), Rhys Stephenson, Alishea Campbell-Drummond, Molly Cook, Lee Hinchcliffe, Laura Hopkinson, Tobias Peever, Evanna Maxted, Kia Pegg, Evie Pickerill, Millie Innes, Emma Nelson, Sian Eleri, Danni Diston
CBeebies	Warrick Brownlow-Pike (as Dodge T. Dog), Joanna Adeyinka-Burford, Ben Cajee, Nigel Clarke, Andy Day, Rebecca Keatley, Evie Pickerill, Cat Sandion, Gyasi Sheppy, George Webster, Phoebe Beddows

==== Former ====
Station/Network	Announcers
BBC One/BBC Two Network	B.W. Adams, Dave Adey, Nana Akua, Ian Aldred, David Allan, Glen Allen, Michael Aspel, Dan Austin, Roger Bailey, Jenni Bale, John Ross-Barnard, Ruth Barnes, Chris Barson, Michael Birley, Piers Bishop, Guy Blackmore, Jasmine Bligh, Peter Bolgar, Lucy Bolger, Stephanie Bower, Penny Bowles, John Braban, John Brand, Tim Brinton, Peter Brook, Rosemary Brooks, Christine Burn, Alma Cadzow, Alison Cairney, Neil Caldicott, Douglas Cameron, Amanda Carlton, Duncan Carse, Andy Cartledge, Kay Cavendish, Pauline Cavilla, Judith Chalmers, Mark Chapman, Emily Chiswell, Jim Clare, Maggie Clews, Crispin Clover, Kathy Clugston, Charles Colville, Jim Colvin, Jayne Constantinis, Elizabeth Cowell, Carol Crawford, Dan Damon, Rachel Darcy, Laura Davison, Chris Denning, Mark Devlin, Ben Edwards, Polly Elwes, Brian Empringham, John Escolme, Martin Everard, Malcolm Eynon, Pauline Eyre, Jumoké Fashola, Adrian Finighan, Jeremy Firth, Arlene Fleming, Michael Gamble, Jennifer Gay, Sarah Gentry, Claire Gibb, John Glover, Peter Gourd, Donald Gray, Toni Green, Anne Gregg, Monica Grey, Peter Haigh, Bruce Hammal, McDonald Hobley, David Hoffman, Olga Hubicka, June Imray, Nikki James, Natalie Jaque, Chris Johnson, Kenneth Kendall, Martin King, Halyna Kozak, Adrian Lacey, Sally Lawrence, Debra Leigh, Chris Loosemore, Francis Lyne, Heather Lynn, Alex MacIntosh, Roseanne MacMillan, Kenneth Maconochie, Steve Madden, Stephanie Madison, Michael Maine, Mary Malcolm, Manju Malhi, Vicki Marriott, Keith Martin, Trevor Maskell, Alex Mason, Roger Maude, Andrea McDowell, Vera McKechnie, Bernard McNab, Noelle Middleton, David Miles, John Mills, Leslie Mitchell, Allis Moss, Martin Muncaster, Tim Nichols, Charles Nove, Yvonne O'Grady, Meryl O'Keeffe, James Orlando, Paul Owen, Mel Oxley, Mary Parker, Isla Paton, Sylvia Peters, Ian Phillips, Nicola Phoenix, Valerie Pitts, Tony Raymont, David Reed, Rachael Robertson, Liz Robinson, Clive Roslin, Louise Rundle, Reg Sanders, Michaela Saunders, Avis Scott, Hannah Scott-Joynt, Brian Sharpe, Clem Shaw, Peter Shoesmith, Winifred Shotter, Valerie Singleton, Mary Small, Zebedee Soanes, Michael Speake, Nick Spilman, Ian de Stains, Lorna Stevens, Cathy Stewart, Michael Stirrup, Richard Straker, Vivien Stuart, Juliet Stubbing, Andy Taylor, Russell Taylor, Guy Thomas, Linda Thomas, Pauline Tooth, Sheila Tracy, John Trevor, Sasha Twining, Simon Vance, Mark Waddington, Patrick Walker, Colin Ward-Lewis, Sarah Ward, Gillian Webb, Jane Westrop, David Wheal, Robin Whitting, Nan Winton, Jane Wymark
BBC Scotland (BBC One/BBC Two)	Elizabeth Adair, Ian Aldred, John Arnott, Anna Maria-Ashe, Craig Austin, Anne-Marie Barth, Isabel Begg, Jackie Bird, Douglas Brock, David Brown, Ken Bruce, Alma Cadzow, Alison Cairney, John Cavanagh, Bob Christie, David Collins, Jane Copland, Andrea Cunningham, Bryce Curdy, Tony Currie, Joanne Davy, Tom Dawson, Mungo Dewar, Olga Dickie, Peter Easton, David Findlay, Brian Ford, Kathleen Garscadden, W. Bryce Gibson, James Gillies, George Gordon, Mike Gower, Martin Granger, Harry Gray, Charles Hamilton, Amanda Harvey, Archie Henry, Patrick Hogg, Alasdair Hutton, Bill Jack, Paul Jamieson, R.E Jeffery, Kemball Johnston, Moultrie R. Kelsall, Rex Kingsley, Douglas Lamond, Victoria Lauder, Howard M. Lockhart, Robert Logan, J.C.S MacGregor, Alasdair MacIntyre, Colin MacIntyre, Carole MacLean, Dermott McQuarrie, Mary Malcolm, Bryan Martin, Rob Matheson, Gillean McDougall, Andrea McDowell, Kirsty Merchant, Douglas Moodie, Alec Monteath, Douglas Morgan, William Moyes, Sandy Munro, Charles Nove, James O'Hara, Pamela Patterson, R.I.C.K. Moubray-Philips, Ivor Phillips, Iain Purdon, J. Douglas Risk, Gordon Roddick, Pamela Ross, Robert Russell, Anne Scott, Bill Simpson, Alister Smith, Michael Speake, Mark Stephen, Arlene Stuart, Aidan Thomson, Norman Thomson, Pam Tibbetts, Martyn Webster, D. S. White, Kirsty Young
BBC Cymru Wales (BBC One/BBC Two)	Dawn Adams, Dan Austin, Roger Bailey, Sian Bassett-Roberts, Steven Beaven, Ceri Berrington, Alun ap Brinley, Rob Brydon, David Canham, Alan Christopher, Ian Cresswell, Steve Dewitt, Ceri Evans, Adrian Finighan, Rob Finighan, Mari Griffith, Mark James, Steve James, Geraint Jones, Nia Wyn-Jones, Robin Jones, Frank Lincoln, Steve Lloyd, Lyn Morgan, Jamie Owen, Gary Price, Richard Rees, Daloni Roberts, Mike Sweet, Peter Twist, Geraint White, Steve Dutfield, Steve Allan, Huw Charles, Alun Ceri Jones, Tim Cooper, Eleri Davison, Enfys Thomas, David Harper, Glyn Lewis, Catrin Morgan, Russ Stroud, Enfys Thomas, Heledd Wilson, Tudur Wyllyd, Sally Jones, Gary Mackenzie, Angharad Powell
BBC Northern Ireland (BBC One/BBC Two)	Pamela Andrews, John Ashe, Lynda Bryans, Kathy Clugston, Peter Dickson, Martin Everard, Steve le Fevre, Michael Fieldhouse, David Gamble, Jacqui Godfray, Duncan Basset Hearle, Alasdair Hutton, Roy Larmour, Walter Love, Edgar Martin, Stephen Montgomery, Michael Nunan, David Olver, Ann Osborough, Gillian Porter, Judith Rebbick, Linda Wray
BBC Choice/ BBC Three	Lola Buckley, Emily Chiswell, Collette Collins, Kieron Elliott, Dean Lydiate, Louise Hulland, Gavin Inskip, Jen Long, Duncan Newmarch, Matthew Jackson, Jayne Sharp, Alyson Slorach (freelance), Jose Vanders, Ashleigh Whitfield, Carys Davies
BBC Four/ BBC Knowledge	Sarah Gentry, Nicola Phoenix, Hannah Scott-Joynt, Zeb Soanes, Tegwen Tucker, Kate Walsh, Becky Wright
CBBC	Toby Anstis, Zoe Ball, Angellica Bell, Ana Boulter, Warrick-Brownlow Pike (as Oucho T. Cactus), Simeon Courtie, Andy Crane, Josie D'Arby, Liam Dolan, Adrian Dickson, Matt Edmondson, Adam Fleming, Philippa Forrester, Anne Foy, Jennifer Gay, Simon Grant, Dani Harmer, London Hughes, Jake Humphrey, Gemma Hunt, Richard McCourt, Sophie McDonnell, Sam Nixon, Kirsten O'Brien, Simon Parkin, Andi Peters, Ed Petrie, Mark Rhodes, Phillip Schofield, Andrew Hayden-Smith, Iain Stirling, Michael Underwood, Holly Walsh, Steve Wilson, Dominic Wood, Lauren Layfield, Katie Thistleton, Karim Zeroual, Joe Tasker, Ben Shires, Warrick Brownlow-Pike (as B1nk Bot 3 and Dodge T. Dog)
CBBC Scotland	John Urquhart, Di Christie, Steve McKenna, Grant Stott, Gail Porter, Marsali Stewart and Kate Heavenor
CBeebies	Eva Alexander, Cerrie Burnell, Nicole Davis, Justin Fletcher, Sarah-Jane Honeywell, Chris Jarvis, Pui Fan Lee, Sue Monroe, Ryan Russell, Sidney Sloane, Alex Winters, Katy Ashworth

=== ITV ===
Network/Station	Announcers
ITV1	Rio Attoh-Wood, Andrea Fox, Christine Hewitt, Jason Milligan, Andrew Hayden-Smith
ITV2	Lucy Jones, Alex Carter, Becky Graham
ITV3	Catherine Whale
ITV4	Justin Wilkes (when?-present)
ITV Quiz	Becky Graham
STV	General continuity: Adam Buksh (2020–present), Toni Frutin (2007–present), Louise Montgomery (2021–present), Angus Miller (2020–2024), Flora Munro (2014–present), Donald Pirie (2005–present), Jim Symon (1983–present)
CITV Breakfast	Kerry Boyne, Luke Franks, Sam Homewood, Robyn Richford
CITV	Tillie Amartey, Tim Dann (freelancer), Seymour Mace, Noah Ros

==== Former ====
Station	Announcers
ABC	Jill Bechley, John Benson (1957–1966), Sidonie Bond, John Braban, John Duncanson, John Edmunds, Philip Elsmore, David Hamilton, Sheila Kennedy, Keith Martin, John McGavin, Mel Oxley, Owen Oyston, Drew Russell, Bill Steel (1967–1968), Julie Stevens, Clifford Swindells
Anglia	Patrick Anthony (1976–1989), John Bacon, Earle Bailey (1968), Greg Bance, Richard Barnes (1983), Graham Bell (1966–1969; 1988–1997), David Bennett, John Benson, Colin Bower, Malcolm Brown, David Clayton, Richard Crowest (1990–1998), Tom Edwards, Adrian Finighan, Phil Fothergill, Liz Fox, Chris French (1988–1990), Katie Glass (1977–2000), Dick Graham, Sharon Gray, Susan Hampshire, Fiona Honan (2000–2002), Graham James, Chris Kelly, Linda Kennedy, Paul Lavers (1987–1991), Verity Lines, Peter Marshall, Keith Martin, Helen McDermott (1979–1991), Sandy Newman Sanders, Tracy Norris, Valerie Oldfield, Caroline Oldrey, Simon Prebble, Gordon Radley, Caroline Raison, Pam Rhodes, Christopher Robbie, Graham Rogers, Drew Russell, Paul Seed (1995–2002), Clem Shaw, Peter Shoesmith, Michael Speake (1975–2000), Vivien Stuart, Paul Thompson (1994–1998), Christine Webber, Colin Weston, Amanda Youngs (1998–2000).
Associated Rediffusion	John Benson, John Charlton, John Edmunds, Anne Every, Robert Gladwell, Tom Glazer, Redvers Kyle (c. 1956–1968), Keith Martin, Leslie Mitchell, Dick Norton, Christopher Robbie, Bill Steel, Muriel Young (1955–1968)
ATV	Arthur Adair, Pat Astley (late 1950s-early 1970s), Greg Bance, Simon Bates, David Bennett, Lesley Blair, Jill Bletchley, John Braban, Avril Carson, Peter Cockburn, Patricia Cox, Peter Davies, Tom Edwards, Su Evans (late 1970s–1981), Dick Graham, Donald Gray, Derek Hobson, David Jamieson, Maurice Kanarek, Caroline Lloyd, Jim Lloyd, Trevor Lucas, Peter Marshall, John McGavin, Ray Moore, Kevin Morrison, Jean Morton, Dick Norton, Mel Oxley, Antony Parker, Mike Prince (1964–1981), Michael Speake, Shaw Taylor, Peter Tomlinson, John Toye, Norman Tozer, Noel Trevarthen, Stewart White (1979–1981), Peter Wilson
Border	Helen Aitken, Craig Austin (1988–1997), Isabel Begg (early 1970s), Derek Batey, Susanna Boccaccio, Colin Bower, Andrew Burns (1989–1996), Allan Cartner (1961–1988), Clive Champney (1963–1990), Tracey Crawford, Fiona Cunningham, Simon Davies (1995–1997), Neil Didsbury (2001–2002), Pat Doody, John Duncanson, Tom Edwards, Jenny Farish, Kerrie Gosney (2000–2002), John Harkins, Pete Haslem, Colin Lamont (1988–1989), Heather Larcombe (1994–2002), Carole MacLean, Lesley Manners [née Cairney], Mary Marquis (1961–1963), Keith Martin, John Myers, Daphne Neville, John Phillips (1990–1995), Sue Radford (1988–1995), Karen Roberts, Clem Shaw, Bill Steel, Mark Thornton (late 1990s), Roger Tilling, Colin Weston, Amanda Youngs (1998–2000)
Carlton	David Allan (1995–2002), Samantha Balshaw, Graham Bannerman (1993–2004), Mike Cooper (1994–1997), Adrian Finighan, Fiona Goldman (1993–2002), Hilary Holden (1994–1997), Mark Lipscomb (1993–2002), Erica Longdon (2000–2002), Andrea McDowell, John McKenzie (2000–2002), Peter Tompkins (2000–2002), David Vickery (2000–2002), Colin Weston, Stephen Westwood
Central	David Allan, Kevan Brighting, (1982–2002), John Caine, Avril Carson, Mike Cooper (1993–1996), Linda Cunningham, Su Evans (1982–2002), Simon Davies (1993–1996), Evadne Fisher (1984–1989), Tasneem Gates (1985), Hilary Holden, Helen Lloyd, Andy Marriott (1991–2002), Verity Martindill, Ted May (1985–2002), Daphne Neville, Ted Elliott (1990–1994), Terry Pearson (1988–2000), Mike Prince (1982–1992), Pam Royle, Allan Sherwin, Vivien Stuart, Gary Terzza (1982–1991), Alan Turton (1988–1998), Paul Veysey (1985–2002), Jo Wheeler, Stewart White (1982–1984), Simon Willis, Amanda Youngs (1999–2002)
Channel	Jane Bayer, Sharon Campbell, Gordon de st Croix, Francis Hamon, Russell Hookey, Russell Habey, Alastair Layzell, Liam Mayclem (1989–1994), Kevin Pamplin, Charles Pitter, Tony Scott-Warren, Jane Stuart
Grampian	Anna Maria-Ashe (1983–1986), Tony Allan (late 1960s–early 1970s), Craig Austin (2003–2004), Isabel Begg (late 1960s–early 1970s), David Bennett (late 1970s–mid-1980s), Lesley Blair (1962–1965), Colin Bower (late 1960s–early 1970s), Anne Brodie (1971–1975; 1980–87), Scott Brown (c. 1993–1998), Christine Burn (1973), Elizabeth Burns (1962–1963), Susan Calland (1982–1984), David Chalmers (1963–1968), Tracey Crawford (1990–1995), Lyn Cunningham (1971–1979), James Copeland (1961), Margaret Donald (1980–1988), Anne Duguid (early-mid 1970s), Kay Duncan (1985–1992), John Duncanson (1980–1998), Kate Fraser (1993–1998), Robin Galloway (1986–1995), Maggie Grant (mid-late 1970s), June Imray (1961–1979), John Jason (1983–1988), Isabelle Jarrett (1983–1984), Douglas Kynoch (1961–1967), Colin Lamont (1984–1985), Elizabeth Mackenzie (1961–1963), Lesley MacLeod (1977–1984), Kate Matheson (1963–1968), Jack McLaughlin (1968–1974), Beverley Nield (1966 - 1967) Daphne Neville (1983), James O'Hara (early-mid 1970s), Fiona Pagett (1993), Maggie Palmer (1979–1980), Daphne Penny (1961–1965), Gordon Radley (late 1970s–early 1980s), Barrie Redfern (1980–1983), Graham Roberts (1963–1968), Rachael Robertson (1995–1998), Anne Scott (1998–2006), James Sleigh (early 1960s), Derek Smith (2005–2006), Jimmy Spankie (1961–1979), Diana Speed (1986–1998), Gary Stein (1996–1998), David Strachan (mid-late 1970s), Arlene Stuart (1988–1993), Jim Symon (1998–2000), Kennedy Thomson (1970–1996), Alan Todd (2001–2006), Jane Turner (mid-1960s), Marion White (late 1960s - early 1970s)
Granada	Helen Aitken (1999–2002), Beverley Ashworth (1987–1999), Greg Bance, Andrew Brittain (1989–1999), Malcolm Brown (1971–1982), Tracey Crawford, Bill Croasdale (1960s), Neil Didsbury (2001–2002), Pamela Dodd (1989–1999), Charles Foster (1971–1992), Kerrie Gosney (2000–2002), Pete Haslam, Philip Hilton, McDonald Hobley, Bob Holness (1961–1964), Graham James, Chris Kay, Jan Leeming, Lynette Lithgow, Maggie Mash (1999–2002), John McKenzie, J.M. Mead, Michael le Moighan, Ray Moore, Don Murray-Henderson (early 1960s–1971), Nick Oliver, Jim Pope (1971–1999), Bob Preedy (1999–2002), Sue Robbie (1982–1983), Phil Sayer, Norman Summers, Roger Tilling (1997–2002), Peter Tomlinson, Colin Weston (1968–1970; early 1980s–1999), R. Williams, Bernard Youens, Amanda Youngs (1998–2000).
HTV Wales	Greg Bance, Philip Banks, David Bennett, Colin Berry (1971), Polly Boyes, Malcolm Brown, Liz Carse, David Charles (late 1980s), Edward Cole, Vincent Daniels, Rhodri Davies, Terry Dyddgen-Jones (late 1970s), Endaf Emlyn, Arfon Haines Davies (1975–1994), Hywel James, Leighton Jones (2003–2006), Monette Lee, Dan Lewis (1993–2000), Sara Llewellyn, Don Moss, Jenny Ogwen, Eiry Palfrey, Gwyn Parry, Su Porter, Sue Powell-Reed (1979–2006), Mike Prince, Margaret Pritchard (1977–1994), Liz Scourfield, Lorna Stevens, Alan Taylor, Peter Tomlinson, Colin Weston, Jonathan Wheatley (1993–1994), Margaret Williams, Dilwyn Young Jones (1982–2006)
HTV West	Sally Alford (1968–1985), Philip Banks (1994–2000), David Bennett, Colin Berry (1971), Malcolm Brown (late 1960s–early 1970s), Liz Carse, Peter Crawford (1985–1997), Victoria Crawford, Sara Edwards, Tom Edwards, David Fitzgerald, Fiona Honan (2000–2002), Jenny Hull (early 1980s), Russell Hurn, Gill Impey (1987–1994), Graham James (2000–2002), Peter Lewis, Peter Marshall, Sam Mason (c. 1989–1994), Annie McKie, Diana Moran, Daphne Neville, Susan Osman, Jim Pope, Su Porter (c. 1989–1994), Mike Prince, Elise Rayner (c. 1988–1991), Graham Rogers, Peter Rowell, Paul Seed (1995–2006), Annie St John (1981–1983; 1987–1990), Michael St John, Lorna Stevens, Alan Taylor, Peter Tomlinson, Colin Weston, Jonathan Wheatley (1993–1998), Patricia Yorston (1980s)
ITV	Graham Bannerman, Stephanie Bower, Dominic Green, Paul Jamieson, Natalie Jaque, David Johnson, Chris Langmore, Mark Manchester, Gina Mellotte, Graham Rogers, Paul Seed, Catherine Whale
LWT	Ruth Anders (1982–1994), Greg Bance, Jill Bechley, Trish Bertram (1982–2002), Mike Carson, Gayle Coleman, Pat Doody, Tom Edwards, Adrian Finighan, Sharon Gray, Keith Harrison, Barri Haynes (late 1970s-early 1980s), Robin Houston (1977–1979), Annie St John, Sarah Kennedy, Peter Lewis (1968–1998), Andy Marriott (1991–2002), Keith Martin (1970-1980s), Verity Martindill, Don Moss (1970s–1980s), Hilary Osborn (1979–1981), Sue Peacock (1981–1984), Pam Rhodes, Andrea Simmons, Alec Taylor (1968–1977), Glen Thompsett (1989–2002), Roger Tilling (1998–2003), David Vickery, Colin Weston, Nigel Williams
Meridian	Samantha Balshaw, David Bradford, Malcolm Brown, Keith Butler, Mike Carson, Pauline Eyre, Fiona Honan (2000–2002), Guy Hornsby, Graham James (2000–2002), Hilary Osborn, Howard Pearce, Graham Rogers, Paul Seed (1995–2002), David Vickery, Jonathan Wheatley
Scottish	Archie Aikman (late 1950s - early 1960s), June Andrews (mid-1970s), Bill Aitken (late 1960s), Clem Ashby (early 1970s–early 1980s), Craig Austin (2003–2004), Alistair Biggar (early-mid 1970s), Lesley Blair (mid-1960s), Arthur Boland (mid-1970s), Raymond Boyd (1959–1966), Anne Brodie (1975–1978), Gerry Burke (1987–2007), Douglas Cameron (early-mid 1960s), Alma Cadzow (early-mid 1990s), Bob Christie (early 1970s), David Chalmers (early-late 1970s), Paul Coia (late 1970s–early 1980s), Fraser Coutts (mid-late 1980s), Jay Crawford (late 1970s - early 1980s), Bryce Curdy (late 1970s–early 1990s), Tony Currie (1976–1989), Nick Dixon (1992–1998), Nicky Docherty (late 1980s-mid 1990s), Pamela Donald (early-mid 1960s), John Douglas (late 1980s–early 1990s), Sheila Duffy (1967–1973), Brian Durkin (late 1970s–early 1980s), Bernard Falk (late 1960s–early 1970s), Brian Ford (1983–2006), Alison Forsyth (mid-late 1980s), Kate Fraser (1998–2006), John G Temple (1958–1960, 1962–1969), David Grant (early-mid 1990s), Jimmy Gordon (1958 - 1965) Mike Gower (1980–1990), Kenny Gregory (1994–1997), Denise Guthrie (late 1980s–early 1990s), Steve Hamilton (1977–1988, late 1980s–2000s), John Hinton (mid-1970s), Morag Hood (mid-1960s), Arlene Hutton (mid-1970s), Hazel Irvine (late 1980s), Bill Jack (late 1960s–early 1970s), Liz Kristiansen (1981–1994), Colin Lamont (1985–1988), Maggie Lavender (1987–2019), Colin MacIntyre (early 2000s) Suzie Maguire (1996–2004), Dave Marshall (mid 1970s-early 1980s), Kate Matheson (1968–1981), Jenny McBain (late 1980s), Fiona McGrady (late 1980s–early 1990s), John McGregor (1958–1961) Sheena McDonald (1981–1986), Christina McIntyre (early 1990s) Cameron McKenna (2000–2016), Steve McKenna (mid-1990s), Jack McLaughlin (early-mid-1970s), Paul Meisak (late 1980s - early 1990s) Nancy Mitchell (early-mid 1970s), Alec Monteath (1964–1969), Arthur Montford (1957–1989) Pauline Muirhead (1979–1994), Jimmy Nairn (1957–1958), Michael O'Halloran (late 1950s–mid 1960s), Maggie Palmer (1980), Ivor Phillips (late 1960s–early 1970s), Ron Robson (late 1960s), Gordon Roddick (1957–1958, 1961–1973), Geoffery Roger (early 1990s), Ian Ross (early 1960s), Drew Russell (1958–1959, late 1960s–early 1970s), Anne Scott (1998–2006), Annie Scott (2000–2008), Ethel Scott (mid-1960s), James Sleigh (late 1950s–early 1960s), Clem Shaw (1974–1975), Bill Simpson (1959–1962), Derek Smith (2005–2015), Jimmy Spankie (1979–1980), Celia Stevenson (late 1980s–early 1990s), Bill Tennant (late 1950s–early 1960s), Alan Todd (2001–2006), Pat Trevor (1964–1969, 1973–1976), Jane Turner (mid-1960s), Jack Webster (1957) Elaine Wells (early-mid 1960s), Marion White (1976 - 1978), Hamish Wilson (early-mid-1970s)
Southern	Michael Alexander, Philip Ashley, Greg Bance, John Benson, Guy Blackmore, Sidonie Bond, Peter Brook, Jane Criddle, John Crosse, Ian Curry, Richard Davies, Clifford Earl, Adrian Edwards (1975–1980), Tom Edwards, Philip Elsmore, Su Evans, Bill Flynn, Liz Fox, Sharon Gray, David Hamilton, Gill Hewitt, Aline James, Lesley Judd, Martin King, Peter Marshall, Keith Martin (1958–1981), Verity Martindill, John McGavin, Diana Moran, Martin Muncaster (1958–1960), Brian Nissen (1958–1981), Meryl O'Keefe (1958–1960), Mel Oxley, Julian Pettifer, Simon Prebble, Mike Prince, Christopher Robbie, Peter Shoesmith, Clifford Swindells, Vanessa Thornton, Nicholas Tresillian, Christine Webber, Colin Weston, Stewart White, Muriel Young
Teledu Cymru	Iris Jones, Robin Jones (1962–1964), Ivor Roberts
Thames	John Benson, Guy Blackmore, Victoria Crawford (1986–1989), Tom Edwards, Philip Elsmore (1968–1992), Evande Fisher (mid-1980s–1991), David Hamilton (1968–1982), Gill Hewitt, Hilary Holden (1980s), Bob Holness, Robin Houston (1978–1992), John Jason, Sheila Kennedy, Mark Lipscomb (1980s–1992), Mark Longhurst, Sarah Lucas (late 1970s-early 1980s), Peter Marshall (1976–1992), Sally McLaren (mid-late 1980s), Jenny Ogwen, Denise Palmer, Laura Penn (1989–1990), Mike Prince, Christopher Robbie, Bill Steel, Lorana Stevens, Vivien Stuart, Patricia Yorston (1980s)
TSW	Samantha Balshaw, Jilly Carter, Jeremy Curry, David Fitzgerald (1985–1992), Jennifer Gavin (1983–1989), Sally Gilbert, Jenny Hull (mid-1980s), Stuart Hutchison, Ruth Langsford (1985–1992), Dinah Lawley (early 1990s), Sally Meen (1990–1992), Gillian Miles (1980s), Caroline Oldrey, Tris Payne, Lawrie Quayle, David Rodgers, Mark Seaman, Roger Shaw (1982–1992), Diana Speed (1982–1986), Judi Spiers (1982–1985), Ian Stirling (1982–1992)
TVS	Anna Maria-Ashe (mid-1980s), John Benson, Trish Bertram, Malcolm Brown (1982–1992), Keith Butler, Mike Carson, Jennifer Clulow, Clifford Earl, Fiona Goldman (early 1990s), Keith Harrison, Guy Hornsby (1980s), John Jason (late 1980s-early 1990s), Heather Lynn, Keith Martin, Verity Martindill, Judy Matheson, Sally McLaren, Richard Mitchley, Brian Nissen (1982–1987), Hilary Osborn, Laura Penn, Gordon Radley, Christopher Robbie (1982–1988), Graham Rogers (1987–1991), Alison Rooper, Linda Thomas, Olumide (Lu) Thomas (late 1980s), Glen Thompsett, David Vickery, Colin Weston, Jane Wyatt
TWW	Sally Alford, Earle Bailey, Colin Bower, Adrian Cairns, Liz Carse, Linda Lee, Bruce Lewis, Peter Lewis, John Mead, Jon Pepper, Ivor Roberts, Maureen Staffer, Alan Taylor, Guy Thomas
Tyne Tees	Helen Aitken (1996–2002), Andy Archer, Greg Bance, Colin Bower, Malcolm Brown, Adrian Cairns (1959–1964), Allan Cartner (1984; 1988-1996), Tom Coyne, Andy Craig, Tracey Crawford, John Crosse (1996–1998), Neil Didsbury, (2001–2002), Pat Doody, Tom Edwards (1979), Liz Fox, Kerrie Gosney (2000–2002), David Hamilton, Pete Haslam, Jane Jermyn (1985–1992), Annie St John (1983–1987), Jon Kelley, Judi Lines (1984–1992), Jim Lloyd, Lesley Manners [née Cairney], Phil Martin, Maggie Mash (1996–2002), Ray Moore, Jonathan Morrell (1990s), Sally Morton, John Mundy, Mike Neville (1962–1964), Valerie Oldfield, Nick Oliver, Karen Petch, Valerie Pitts, Bob Preedy (1996–2002), Pam Royle (1984), Kathy Secker (1976–1984; 1990–1996), Clem Shaw, Lyn Spencer (1975–1979; 1983; 1988–1993), Susan Spencer, Bill Steel (1976–1996), Roger Tilling (1998–1999), Neville Wanless (1971–1991), Colin Weston (1980-1984), Stephen Whitlock (1992–1994), Amanda Youngs (1998–2000).
UTV	Bernard Baird, Pamela Ballantine (1984–1993; 2009–2010), Alan Brady, Aidan Browne (1993–2020), Keith Burnside, Lynda-Jane Caithness (1975–1978), Tina Campbell, Audra Cunningham, Denise Dearsley (1962–1963), Sarah Dobson (2007–2009), Janet Donaghy (1983–1984), John Duncanson (1965–1966), Brian Durkin (1959–1968), Liz Fox, Lynda Fulford (2007–2009), James Greene (1959–1965), Anne Gregg, Tracey-Anne Griffiths (1991–1996), Keith Hayes (1980–1989), Alyson Hogg (early 1980s), Gillian Ievers, Marc Mallett (2007–2009), Peter Marshall (1967–1969), Edgar Martin, Raymond Maxwell, Diane McGladdery (late 1970s-early 1980s), Adrienne McGuill (1959–1969), Ivor Mills, Frank Mitchell (1987–1993), J.J. Murphy (early 1970s), Rose Neill, John O'Hara (1978–1984), Barbara Palmer Bradley (1985–1991), Gillian Porter (1993–2020), Patricia Robie, Lata Sharma (1992–1993), Julian Simmons (1984–2020), Bill Smyth (1968–1987), Ernie Strathdee, Robin Taylor (1993–2009), Audra Thomas (1998–2001; 2008–2009), Even White, Joanne Woods (c. 1976–1986)
Westcountry	Trish Bertram, Malcolm Brown, Philip Elsmore (1993–1999), Peter Griffin (1993–2002), Chris Langmore (1994–2002), Lorna Stevens (1993–1994), Roger Tilling (1996–1997)
Westward	John Benson, Colin Bower, Penny Bowles, Fern Britton (1980–1981), Jennifer Clulow (late 1970s–1981), Guy Corey, Jane Criddle, Susan Denny, Linda Goodman (late 1960s), Colleen Gray, Alison Holloway, Stuart Hutchinson, Sheila Kennedy, Jan Leeming (1965–1966), Helen McDermott, Audrey Reebey, Ian Richie, David Rodgers, Roger Shaw (1961–1981), Judi Spiers (1977–1981), Ian Stirling (1974–1981), Jane Turner
Yorkshire Television	Helen Aitken (1995–2002), Tracey Crawford, John Crosse (early 1970s–1999), Neil Didsbury (2001–2002), Brian Durkin, Kerrie Gosney (2000–2002), Pete Haslam, John Jason, Paul Kaye (c. 1970s–1980), Redvers Kyle (1968–1993), Paul Lally (c. 1968–1990s), Peter Lewis (late 1960s), Keith Martin, Maggie Mash (1988–2002), Nick Oliver, Karen Petch, Bob Preedy (1988–2002), Earl Richmond (1968-c. 1970s), Graham Roberts (c. 1968–1993), Andy Siddle, Ian de Stains (1968–1970), Roger Tilling (1998–1999), Colin Weston, Stephen Whitlock (1992–1994), Amanda Youngs (1998–2000).

=== Channel 4 ===
Announcers
Mo Ayoub, Kelsey Bennett, Corie Brown, Amanda Carlton, Danny Cowan, Sam Darlaston, Ciara Dudley, Jeanna Gallagher, Tyler Melville-Griffiths, Jemma McCarthy, Jay McGregor, Adriana Marabese, Simon Moore, Grace Nicoll, Pete Nottage, Dominic O'Shea, Beth Palmer, Isla Paton, Fraser Pender, Gully Singh, Peggy Walker, Lynsey Young

==== Former ====
- Edward Adoo
- Louis Antwi
- Laura Aspinall
- Ali Ballantyne
- John Beasley
- Marcus Bentley
- Bill Bingham (1983-c.1985)
- Sean Bolger
- Carole Bolt
- Jon Briggs
- Robin Brown
- Martin Buchanan
- Robin Burke
- Syd Burke (1983)
- Julia Cameron
- Paul Coia (1982-1983)
- Jane Copland
- Stephen Daly
- Michelle Dunn
- Ben Edwards
- Vanessa Edwards
- Sabrina Farley (1983)
- Adrian Finighan
- Barra Fitzgibbon
- Arlene Fleming
- Claire Gibb
- Alex Harris Goldberg
- Penny Gore
- Keith Harrison (1982-c.1985)
- Tony Hawkins
- Barri Haynes
- Olga Hubicka (1982-1983)
- Veronika Hyks (1983-c.1985)
- Tracy Ifeachor
- Hana Khalique
- Nigel Lambert
- John Leeson
- John Livesey
- Erica Longdon
- David MacLeod
- Tracey-Anne McCoy
- Paula Middlehurst
- David Miles
- Ric Mills
- Richard Mitchley (1984)
- Kate Moon
- Vuyiswa Ngqobougwana
- Trevor Nicholls
- Miles Otway
- Graham Rogers
- Alison Rooper
- Carlo Salvatore
- Paul Seed
- Andrea Simmons
- Kate Stephenson
- David Stranks (1982-1984)
- Ian Swann
- Gary Terzza
- Jess Thom
- Linda Thomas (1983-1985)
- Helen Veysey
- David Vickery
- Paula Vinnick
- Patrick Walker
- Kate Walsh
- Lisa Walters
- Jane Watson
- Martin Weedon
- Gary Whitford
- Soraya Willis
- Hayden Wood
- Joanne Zorian

=== S4C ===
Station	Announcers
S4C	Siân Bassett Roberts, Huw Charles, Rolant Prys Davies, Richard Elfyn, Alwyn Humphreys, Sara Hunter, Alun Ceri Jones, Liz Scourfield
Stwnsh	Eleri Griffiths, Owain Gwynedd, Geraint Hardy, Anni Llyn, Tudur Phillips, Rachel Edmunds
Cyw	Gareth Delve (in-vision), Rachael Solomon (in-vision), Huw Owen, Cati Rhys, Griff Daniels, Elin Haf

==== Former ====
Station	Announcers
S4C	Alan ap Brinley, Gwenno ap Dafydd, Elan ap Robert, Nia Ceidiog, Glenda Clwyd, Dennis Francis, Rowenna Griffin, Heulwen Haf, Elinor John, John Jones, Robin Jones, Rowena Jones-Thomas, Siân Lloyd, Richard Mitchley, Garry Nicholas, Jenny Ogwen, Gwyn Parry, Juli Paschalis, Rolant Prys, Siân Reeves-Daleso, Siân Thomas, Margaret Williams
Planed Plant (now Stwnsh)	Rhydian Bowen Phillips, Elain Edwards, Sarra Elgan, Mari Grug, Lisa Gwilym, Branwen Gwyn, Alex Jones, Alun Williams
Planed Plant Bach (now Cyw)	Martyn Geraint, Lowri Williams

=== Channel 5 ===
Station	Announcers
Channel 5	David Flynn, Jenny Gannon, Andrea McDowell, David Wartnaby, Wesley Theobalds
Milkshake!	Olivia Birchenough, Kiera-Nicole Brennan, Nathan Connor, Kemi Majeks, Derek Moran, Jen Pringle, David Ribi, Sita Thomas, Amy Thompson

==== Former ====
Station	Announcers
Channel 5	Glen Allen, Marcus Bentley, Anna Bernard, Trish Bertram, Vicki Blight, O.J. Borg, Bill Buckley, Jim Colvin, Danie Couchman, Louise Crowley, Rachel Darcy, John Darvall, Andy Davies, Vanessa Edwards, Gema Ensenat, Pauline Eyre, Jane Farnham, Keeley-Jade Flanders, Gavin Inskip, Paul Jacobs, Adrian Lacey, John Last, Ted May, Stuart McWilliam, Dave Payne, Natasha Powell, Lucy Sassoon, Nick Sayce, Kat Shoob, Kelly-Anne Smith, Rosey Thewlis, David Vickery
Milkshake!	Lucy Alexander, Curtis Angus, Elizabeth Bower, Emilia Coxe, Philip Ercolano, Beth Evans, Ellie Harrison, Konnie Huq, Casey-Lee Jolleys, Eddie Matthews, Andrew McEwan, Kate McIntyre, Dave Payne, Lynne Thigpen, Chuck Thomas, Naomi Wilkinson, Hannah Williams, Anna Williamson

=== Sky ===
Station	Announcers
Sky One	Gema Ensenat, Katie Hudson, Kate Morton, Scott Turnall, David Wayne, Nessa Wrafter
Sky Living	Collette Collins, Dave Payne
Sky Movies	Claire Sturgess

==== Former ====
Station	Announcers
Sky One	Glen Allen, Faye Bamford, Philippa Collins, Paul Daniels, Bruce Hammal, Shaun Keaveny, Michelle Lukes, Kelly-Anne Smith, Luke Smith, Claire Sturgess, David Wartnaby, Martin Weedon, Neil Williams

== Radio ==
=== BBC ===
Station	Announcers
BBC Radio 4	Chris Aldridge, Viji Alles, Kelsey Bennett, Ron Brown, Charles Carroll, Lisa Costello, Richard Evans, Arlene Fleming, John Hammond, Danielle Jalowiecka, Jim Lee, Amanda Litherland, Joanna Kean, Caroline Nicholls, Neil Nunes, Andrew Peach, Tina Ritchie, Al Ryan, Tom Sandars, Alan Smith
BBC Radio 4 Extra	Ron Brown, Wes Butters, Kathy Clugston, Arlene Fleming, Jim Lee, David Miles, Joanna Pinnock, Debbie Russ, Neil Sleat, Alan Smith, Steve Urquhart, Chris Berrow, Amanda Litherland
BBC Radio Wales	Sian Howell, Lyn Morgan, Kim Marks, Sian Roberts, David Woodward

==== Former ====
Station	Announcers
BBC; Radio 4	David Anderson, Alice Arnold, Andrew Crawford, Chris Berrow, Bill Bingham, Louise Botting, Carolyn Brown, Louise Bruce, Piers Burton-Page, Pauline Bushnell, Harriet Cass (senior announcer), Edward Cole, Charles Colville, Charles Nove, Corrie Corfield, Susan Denny, Mairead Devlin, Peter Donaldson, Colin Doran, Charlotte Green, John Hedges, Anna Hill, Peter Jefferson, Astley Jones, Jonathan Lampon, Zoe Diamond, Mark Forrest, Jenny Lane, Pennie Latin, Annie McKie, Laurie Macmillan, Bryan Martin, David Miles, Kate Moon, Rory Morrison, Patrick Muirhead, Daphne Neville, Hilary Osborn, Jamie Owen, Brian Perkins, Howard Philpott, Susan Rae, Dalya Raphael, Alison Rooper, Clive Roslin, Andy Rushton, Michaela Saunders, Vaughan Savidge, Neil Sleat, Zeb Soanes, Diana Speed, Moira Stuart, Luke Tuddenham, Steve Urquhart, Catriona Young
BBC; Radio Wales	Alan Christopher, Mari Griffith, Nia Wyn-Jones
