= David Allan (broadcaster) =

English continuity announcer

David Allan (born 7 August 1940, in Bury, Lancashire) is an English broadcaster and journalist, best known for his work as a television continuity announcer and radio presenter.

== Radio career ==
Educated at Bury Grammar School, Allan spent nine years working in theatre as a stage manager before he began broadcasting on the offshore station Radio 390 in 1966. In 1968, he joined BBC Radio 2 to present country music programmes, a role he occupied for much of the 1970s and to a lesser extent in the 1980s, also presenting the station's early Sunday morning show from 1989–91 and deputising for the likes of Ray Moore and Terry Wogan.

In 1994, Allan presented shows on Country 1035 in London, but did not stay long and was a critic of the station's music playlist. From January 1995, he presented country music programmes on Radio 2 again, but was replaced by Bob Harris from April 1999. He also presented a show on Melody FM, and subsequently returned to Country 1035 and was heard at weekends on PrimeTime Radio before the station closed down. In 2002, he won an International Broadcaster award from the American Country Music Association.

Allan also works as a country music journalist, having regularly written opinion pages in the magazine Country Music People and presented country music programming for BBC TV, including coverage of the Wembley Country Music Festival.

== Television career ==
Allan began freelancing as a network continuity announcer for BBC Television in 1969 and became a regular announcer three years later, remaining with the BBC presentation department until 1994. While announcing for BBC One and BBC Two, Allan also announced for BBC World Service Television during the early 1990s. In April 2012, Allan returned to the BBC as the promotional voice for a season of 1970s-themed programming, including a return to his continuity role on 21 April 2012.

From 1995, he was heard announcing for Carlton Television in London on freelance duties, and during the late 1990s and early 2000s, was heard across much of the ITV network as an announcer for overnight programming. Since 2000, he has also worked as an announcer for the British version of History, working alongside former BBC continuity colleagues David Miles and Charles Nove. He is currently providing continuity for Military History Channel in the UK.
