= Beverley Ashworth =

British voiceover artist

Beverley Ashworth is a voiceover artist best known as a former continuity announcer for Granada Television.

Ashworth began her Granada career in the late 1980s, working alongside Colin Weston, Jim Pope and Charles Foster amongst others.

During her time at the station, she also read late night and weekend Granada Reports news bulletins. Her voice was also heard during Granada's part-networked Night Time service, which was also broadcast in the Grampian, Border, Tyne Tees, TSW and Ulster regions.

Ashworth left Granada during the mid-1990s to set up 'Tongue & Groove', a Manchester-based voiceover agency, alongside John Basham. As well as running the agency, Beverley continues to provide voiceovers for various companies and is also involved with corporate work.
