= Richard Hurst =

British writer and director

Richard Hurst is a British writer and director of comedy, theatre and television.

== Biography ==
Born Richard Turner in Surrey, he attended Boston Grammar School and Oakham School before studying at St Hugh's College, Oxford, and training as a director at the Royal Welsh College of Music and Drama and the Royal National Theatre Studio.

== Early career ==
He was a founding member of the sketch group The Four Horsemen, whose series This Is Pop! was broadcast on BBC Choice. His Edinburgh work has included work with Pegabovine and Girl and Dean, Moon The Loon (a play about Keith Moon), the sell-out children's shows Potted Potter, Potted Pirates, which he co-wrote, and Silly Billy Bum Breath. Potted Potter, which condenses all the Harry Potter novels into 80 minutes, has had two off-Broadway runs for a total of 30 weeks, and five West End runs.

In 2004, he directed Bill Hicks: Slight Return, which he co-wrote with Chas Early. The play suggests what would happen if Bill Hicks returned to Earth for one final show. The show toured extensively in the UK, including four West End runs, and also appeared in Éire, Belgium and Australia. In 2010 he co-wrote and directed Potted Panto, which opened at the Pleasance Theatre, Edinburgh, and subsequently transferred to the Vaudeville Theatre, London, where it was nominated for an Olivier Award for Best Entertainment. It has also run for five seasons at the Southwark Playhouse, most recently in 2019–20.

== Cooperative work ==
He has also worked extensively with Miranda Hart as a writer, director and script editor. He co-wrote seventeen episodes of the multi-award-winning Miranda for BBC2, having script edited the first episode. In 2010 he was nominated for a Royal Television Society Award for his work on Miranda. Other television work includes writing three episodes of Secret Diary Of A Call Girl for Tiger Aspect for ITV2 / Showtime.

In March 2013 Bluestone 42, which he co-wrote and co-created with James Cary, was broadcast by the BBC. It was subsequently renewed for its second (2014) and third (2015) seasons. He also co-wrote three episodes of the second series of The Rebel on Gold in 2017.

== Drama festival ==
He has been involved in the National Student Drama Festival in various capacities, since winning the Sunday Times’ Harold Hobson Student Drama Critic Award in 1994 and the RSC Buzz Goodbody Award in 1995.
