= Commercial Neutral Broadcasting Company =

European offshore radio station

- Offshore (North Sea); Netherlands (broadcast origin), United Kingdom (target)
- Broadcast area: North Sea
- Frequencies: (via Radio Veronica, FM/AM)
- Branding: CNBC

Programming
- Language: English
- Format: Pirate radio (English-language programming)
- Affiliations: Radio Veronica

Ownership
- Owner: Ross Radio Productions Ltd

History
- First air date: 1960
- Last air date: 1961

The Commercial Neutral Broadcasting Company (CNBC) was an English language pirate radio station which hired airtime for a few hours each day from the Dutch pirate Radio Veronica in 1960–1961. Programmes were pre-recorded at Veronica's Amsterdam studio together with the Dutch programmes, and broadcast from the Veronica ship Borkum Riff. The address for prospective advertisers was given as Ross Radio Productions Ltd, 23 Upper Wimpole Street, W1.

CNBC has the distinction of being the first pirate station to broadcast to the United Kingdom, almost four years before Radio Caroline, although few British listeners ever heard it as its signal originated from the Dutch side of the North Sea and did not penetrate very far inland. After only a few months Veronica terminated its contract because the advertising revenue from Dutch programming was more lucrative.

== See also ==
- Pirate radio in the United Kingdom
- Keith Martin (broadcaster)
