= Rachael Robertson (television presenter) =

British television continuity announcer and presenter

Rachael Robertson is a former British television continuity announcer and presenter.

Robertson began her career with Grampian Television (now STV North) in the mid-1990s as a staff announcer and newsreader for Grampian Headlines, replacing Tracey Crawford, who had left to join Granada. She also presented a number of regional programmes for the station including The Birthday Spot, The Scottish Tourism Supreme Awards and the BAFTA-nominated Saturday morning children's magazine show Wize Up, alongside announcing colleagues Scott Brown and Kate Fraser. Following the Scottish Media Group's takeover of Grampian in 1997, Robertson featured as a reporter for Scottish Television's long-running travel show, Scottish Passport.

Robertson left Grampian when the station closed down its Aberdeen-based presentation department in 1998 and soon became an announcer for BBC1 and BBC2. She left the BBC in December 2003. Robertson is no longer working in television.
