= Bluestone 42 =

British TV sitcom (2013–2015)

- Genre: Sitcom
- Written by: Richard Hurst; James Cary
- Directed by: Iain B MacDonald; David Sant
- Starring: Oliver Chris; Gary Carr; Jamie Quinn; Scott Hoatson; Katie Lyons; Stephen Wight; Tony Gardner; Kelly Adams; Keeno Lee Hector; Matthew Lewis; Laura Aikman
- Composer: Vince Pope
- Country of origin: United Kingdom
- Original language: English
- No. of series: 3
- No. of episodes: 21

Production
- Executive producer: Stephen McCrum
- Producer: Michelle Farr
- Production location: South Africa
- Editor: Nigel Williams
- Running time: 30 minutes
- Production company: BBC Productions

Original release
- Network: BBC Three
- Release: 5 March 2013 – 13 April 2015

Bluestone 42 is a British sitcom about a British bomb disposal detachment in Afghanistan during Operation Herrick, first broadcast on 5 March 2013 on BBC Three. The third and final series began on 9 March 2015 and ended on 13 April 2015. In July 2015, writers Richard Hurst and James Cary confirmed the show would not return for a fourth series, citing BBC Three's impending move to online and the withdrawal of troops from Afghanistan as contributing towards the show having run its course.

While the show takes place in Helmand Province, the series was filmed in South Africa.

== Synopsis ==
A mix of black comedy and action, Bluestone 42 focused on the camaraderie between soldiers, situational comedy, bureaucracy, conflicts of interests and relationships, and is contrasted with the deadly situations the soldiers are required to defuse. The show's name refers to the unit's call sign and is rendered verbally as "Bluestone Four-Two".

== Cast and characters ==
=== Overview ===
Character	Actor			
Character	Actor	1	2	3
Captain Nick Medhurst	Oliver Chris	Main	Main	Recurring
Corporal Christian "Millsy" Mills	Gary Carr	Main		
Private Kevin "Mac" McDowell	Jamie Quinn	Main	Main	Main
Private Euan "Rocket" Armstrong	Scott Hoatson	Main	Main	Main
Corporal Lynda Bird	Katie Lyons	Main	Main	Main
Lance Corporal Simon "Skip" Lansley	Stephen Wight	Main	Main	Main
Lieutenant Colonel Philip Smith	Tony Gardner	Main	Main	Main
Reverend Mary Greenstock CF	Kelly Adams	Main	Main	
Faruq Harrif	Keeno Lee Hector	Main	Main	Main
Corporal Gordon "Towerblock" House	Matthew Lewis		Main	Main
Captain Ellen Best	Laura Aikman			Main

== Episodes ==
Series	Episodes	Originally released	
Series	Episodes	First released	Last released
1	8	5 March 2013	23 April 2013
Christmas Special		26 December 2013	
2	6	27 February 2014	27 March 2014
3	6	9 March 2015	13 April 2015

=== Series 1 (2013) ===
No. overall	No. in season	Title	Directed by	Written by	Original release date
1	1	"Episode 1"	Iain B MacDonald	Richard Hurst & James Cary	5 March 2013
A visit to Bluestone 42’s base from a CIA operative ends in disaster when he is killed by the Taliban. None of the unit show any signs of grief towards the deceased Colonel Carter, while Captain Nick Medhurst pretends to have felt nothing when Carter died as a way to seduce Mary, the new Padre, whom he takes an immediate liking to, but she quickly knocks him back.
2	2	"Episode 2"	Iain B MacDonald	Richard Hurst & James Cary	12 March 2013
Nick is desperate to find some decent food to use in an attempt to seduce Mary, whilst Simon gets into trouble on roadside ops.
3	3	"Episode 3"	Iain B MacDonald	Richard Hurst & James Cary	19 March 2013
After Bluestone 42 join a midnight raid on a bomb factory and rescue a kidnapped Danish aid worker (Birgitte Hjort Sørensen), they find more than they bargained for. Simon tries to get a book deal for his memoir.
4	4	"Episode 4"	Iain B MacDonald	Richard Hurst & James Cary	26 March 2013
Mary reveals a secret about her past before she became a padre and Nick tries to take full advantage. Bird is offered a promotion.
5	5	"Episode 5"	Iain B MacDonald	Richard Hurst & James Cary	2 April 2013
Nick tries to prove he is not superstitious to the padre, while Simon tries to earn respect by joining in dangerous homemade games with Mac and Rocket.
6	6	"Episode 6"	Iain B MacDonald	Richard Hurst & James Cary	9 April 2013
Nick and Simon help each other to learn to dance, whilst the arrival of veterinary corps Captain Parikh reveals Bird as a terrible flirt.
7	7	"Episode 7"	Iain B MacDonald	Richard Hurst & James Cary	16 April 2013
A mortar attack on the patrol base sends Bluestone 42 diving for cover.
8	8	"Episode 8"	Iain B MacDonald	Richard Hurst & James Cary	23 April 2013
Nick faces a gruelling challenge with a booby-trapped car bomb, while Simon finally stands up to his fiancée.

=== Christmas Special (2013) ===
No. overall	No. in season	Title	Directed by	Written by	Original release date
9	1	"Christmas Special"	Iain B MacDonald	Richard Hurst & James Cary	26 December 2013
This episode was originally due to air on 23 December but was postponed after a British soldier was killed during active service in Afghanistan.

=== Series 2 (2014) ===
No. overall	No. in season	Title	Directed by	Written by	Original release date
10	1	"Episode 1"	Iain B MacDonald	Richard Hurst & James Cary	27 February 2014
Mac tries to get the camp's "filthiest bastard" award by lying about how he contracted crabs. Nick tries to bluff his way through a Glock Weapons Handling Test
11	2	"Episode 2"	Iain B MacDonald	Richard Hurst & James Cary	6 March 2014
A blast from the past knocks Nick off his game. Bird tries to teach Mary a lesson that the padre is out of touch with the troops.
12	3	"Episode 3"	Iain B MacDonald	Richard Hurst & James Cary	13 March 2014
Nick and the Lt Colonel find themselves in a battle of wills. Rocket gets a pet rat.
13	4	"Episode 4"	Iain B MacDonald	Richard Hurst & James Cary	20 March 2014
The team gets a visit from a government minister, to whom Mary unexpectedly takes a shine.
14	5	"Episode 5"	Iain B MacDonald	Richard Hurst & James Cary	27 March 2014
Bird hatches a plan to stop Nick and Mary going on about each other once and for all.
15	6	"Episode 6"	Iain B MacDonald	Richard Hurst & James Cary	3 April 2014
Simon's lack of trust in Mac and Rocket comes back to bite him.

=== Series 3 (2015) ===
No. overall	No. in season	Title	Directed by	Written by	Original release date
16	1	"Episode 1"	David Sant	Richard Hurst & James Cary	9 March 2015
We rejoin the Bluestone 42 team after the IED explosion has hit their Mastiff. Have they all survived?
17	2	"Episode 2"	David Sant	Richard Hurst & James Cary	16 March 2015
The team are called out to a major operation, where events take a worrying turn when an infantryman snagged on a tripwire is saved by ATO Captain Nick Medhurst but then triggers the device from a second tripwire by taking a path that had not been cleared, injuring them both. Nick is medevacked to Bastion Hospital in critical condition while the rest of the team are stood down and return to their FOB to await news of Nick. Simon makes a life-changing discovery, and despite devastating news from the medical unit, the Colonel insists that the pub quiz night must go on and 'accidentally' reveals a clue to the location of the question sheet to the unit, thus starting a treasure hunt around the base (setup by the Colonel to take their minds off of Nick's condition).
18	3	"Episode 3"	David Sant	Richard Hurst & James Cary	23 March 2015
Bluestone 42 meets their new ATO Captain Ellen Best, who has replaced Nick for the remainder of the unit's tour. A certain new arrival on base attracts Simon's attention. Towerblock is put through his paces after challenging Rocket to a battle of the fittest
19	4	"Episode 4"	David Sant	James Cary & Mark Evans	30 March 2015
The team incur a major Taliban attack on their base while Simon suspects a member of the Afghan National Army who are there for bomb diffusion training. The attack distracts Ellen and Bird from their bickering and Towerblock from a difficult phone call to his wife. The team work together, alongside Simon's suspected ANA soldier, to foil a Green on Blue attack when another member of the ANA group lets four insurgents into the base. Rocket gets addicted to service issue orange-flavoured powdered squash during several interrupted dares.
20	5	"Episode 5"	David Sant	Richard Hurst & Mark Evans	6 April 2015
Ellen has to learn to bend the rules, Mac and Rocket do gladiatorial combat and Bird sets Simon up for a fall.
21	6	"Episode 6"	David Sant	Richard Hurst & James Cary	13 April 2015
As the team prepare to leave Afghanistan for good, Simon receives some devastating news.

== Reception ==
Bluestone 42 has been met with positive reviews. In The Independent, James Rampton described the show as "The Hurt Locker meets Miranda" and said that it "strikes the right balance between edgy and entertaining". Rich Johnston of BleedingCool.com compared the show favourably to M*A*S*H. Corporal Daniel Whittingham, a British Army bomb disposal expert, said the series' black humour was "spot-on" and its action scenes "pretty accurate".

== Distribution ==
=== DVD ===
Series	Release name	No. of discs	UK release date (region 2)	Notes
1	Bluestone 42 – Series 1	2	29 April 2013	Out-takes; Mac and Rocket: Uncut
2	Bluestone 42 – Series 2	1	23 March 2015	
3	Bluestone 42 – Series 3	1	16 November 2015	
4	Bluestone 42 – The Complete Collection	4	16 November 2015	The Complete Series contains 21 Episodes including Out-takes and Mac and Rocket: Uncut

=== Broadcasts ===
In December 2014 Series 1 was broadcast on the Australian ABC network, and online player ABC iView.
