= Redvers Kyle =

British television presenter (1929–2015)

- Redvers Kyle on Calendar in 1993
- Born: November 25, 1929; Germiston, South Africa
- Died: November 18, 2015 (aged 85); Leeds, West Yorkshire, England
- Occupation: television announcer
- Years active: 1953-1998
- Known for: ITV continuity announcer, presenter of education programmes
- Television: Looking and Seeing; How We Used to Live; The Giddy Game Show

Redvers Buller Kyle (25 November 1929 – 18 November 2015) was a South African-born British broadcaster, voice over artist, actor and composer, best known for his work on the ITV network in the United Kingdom over forty years.

== Biography ==
Redvers Kyle was born in Germiston, South Africa and named after General Sir Redvers Buller, the British military commander in the early stages of the Anglo-Boer War. During his university studies, he began his broadcasting career with the South African Broadcasting Corporation in Johannesburg, mostly in children's programmes, and appeared in dramatic productions including Boy with a Cart, which won him an award at a national drama festival.

Kyle emigrated to England in August 1952, and spent a year as a primary school teacher in south London before becoming a freelance radio and television broadcaster. His involvement with ITV began in its first month - September 1955 - when he appeared in the series Sunday Afternoon for ATV. He also made early contributions to ITN, providing commentary to news film.

His career as a continuity announcer began when he joined Associated-Rediffusion in February 1956, working alongside Muriel Young and the station's head of presentation Leslie Mitchell. Kyle later became Chief Announcer and continued with Rediffusion until the company lost its franchise. He was on duty for the station's final night of transmission on Monday 29 July 1968.

It was during Kyle's time at Rediffusion that he presented the first schools programme on British television in 1957. The programme was called Looking and Seeing and he was criticised for talking too much and trying "to cover too much ground in too short a time".

He then hosted other schools and children's programmes produced by A-R in the late 1950s and early 1960s, voiced over local adverts for ATV in the Midlands, was heard as a narrator on a number of LP records, and composed light music such as "Busy Bachelor", which was used as startup music for ABC in the late 1950s.

Following Rediffusion's closure, Kyle moved to the new Yorkshire Television in Leeds, where he served as its chief continuity announcer for nearly a quarter of a century. During this period, his voice was heard nationally on trails and promos for networked programming as well as the long-running schools series How We Used To Live and during the 1980s, the YTV children's series The Giddy Game Show. He also worked on comedian Les Dawson's first television programme Sez Les.

Kyle retired from YTV in 1993, alongside announcing colleague Graham Roberts - both announcers made a rare in-vision appearance on the regional news programme Calendar the same evening to mark their retirement although he continued to work freelance as a voiceover artist, providing announcing cover for both YTV and Tyne Tees Television until around 1998.

In recognition of his work for Rediffusion, his voice was also heard in programmes made by Victor Lewis-Smith, who had revived the Associated-Rediffusion name for his own production company.

Kyle was known for his rich voice, described as "deep and distinctive" by BAFTA, and like "plum brandy" by former Yorkshire Television presenter Austin Mitchell.

Redvers Kyle's voice
Redvers Kyle's shutdown script for Yorkshire Television in 1984 demonstrating his rich voice

Kyle died on 18 November 2015 at the age of 85, one week before his 86th birthday.
