= Alpha Television =

British television studio operator

- Company type: Limited company
- Founded: 1956; 70 years ago
- Founder: Associated Television and ABC Weekend TV
- Defunct: 1970; 56 years ago
- Headquarters: Alpha Tower, Aston

Alpha Television was a British limited company which operated television studios in Aston, Birmingham from 1956 to 1970.

== History ==
The company was formed in 1956 as a joint venture between two newly created Independent Television (ITV) companies, ATV and ABC. The former operated the contract to broadcast programming to the Midlands during the week, the latter at weekends.

The respective companies would later establish production centres near London and Manchester (ATV at Elstree, ABC at Teddington and Didsbury), but despite conflicts over contract applications and rivalry over the corporate acronym, the costs of creating separate facilities in the Midlands led to a decision to cooperate. A separate holding company to operate the centre, Alpha Television Services (Birmingham) Limited, was formed.

The new company purchased the former Astoria Cinema in Aston Road North which had closed a few months earlier.

Initial alterations created one studio with production facilities supplied by an outside broadcast vehicle, telecine facilities and separate presentation suites for ATV and ABC.

In 1963, ATV and ABC decided to upgrade facilities at Aston and a substantial investment saw the creation of an office block, canteen and second studio adjacent to the existing site (52.497425°N 1.884092°W), while the facade of the original cinema was re-constructed to match. New facilities included an enlarged telecine facility, master control and presentation suites.

== Closure ==
In 1967, the regulatory body for ITV, the Independent Television Authority, announced significant changes to the regional contracts to broadcast ITV. ABC Weekend Television lost its Midlands weekend contract as the authority decided to create a seven-day licence for the area, which they awarded to ATV. ABC were offered the London weekday contract upon condition of a merger with the existing holder Rediffusion, in the process becoming Thames Television.

As a result, ABC decided to sell their stake in Alpha Television to ATV as their interest in the Midlands had ended. However the Alpha studios were designed for monochrome broadcasting and as the ITV network was planning to launch colour transmissions in late 1969, ATV decided to construct new purpose-built colour studios in central Birmingham.

In October 1968, work started on the Paradise Centre (later known as ATV Centre), a £15 million (equivalent to £229 million today) complex known as Alpha Tower off Broad Street. By early 1970 the Alpha Studios were closed with all employees being transferred to ATV (renamed as ATV Network), and Alpha Television Services (Birmingham) Limited went into voluntary liquidation and ceased trading.

== Later use ==
The site had a variety of uses until purchased by the Independent Local Radio station BRMB in 1974. The station vacated the site in 1996 to new facilities at Brindleyplace, a few hundred yards from the former ATV studios on Broad Street. The office block remains although the converted cinema was demolished.
