= James Cary (writer) =

21st-century British TV and radio writer

- Education: Durham University (Theology)
- Occupations: TV and radio writer
- Notable work: creator and writer of Think the Unthinkable

James Cary is a British television and radio writer.

== Career ==
Cary is the creator and writer of BBC Radio 4's Sony Radio Academy Awards Silver Award-winning comedy series, Think the Unthinkable (four series) and lead writer on the sketch show, Concrete Cow. Cary co-created and co-wrote the BBC Three series Bluestone 42 with Richard Hurst. He has also written for My Hero, My Family and co-written two radio series with comedian Milton Jones, as well as contributing to a number of sketch shows and children's and animation programmes. His radio comedy series Hut 33 about Bletchley Park boffins, starring Robert Bathurst and Olivia Colman, ran for three series. He has contributed to some episodes of Miranda, the television version of the comedy show Miranda Hart's Joke Shop which was nominated for a Sony Radio Academy Award.

His script editing work includes Almost Never (CBBC), Recorded For Training Purposes (BBC Radio 4), Gigglebiz (CBeebies) and Mr Bloom's Nursery (CBeebies).

== Books ==
In 2013, he published his first book, Death By Civilisation, based on articles written for the magazine Third Way. A novel, Crossword Ends In Violence, followed in 2014.

In 2019 he published the Sacred Art of Joking followed by The Gospel according to a Sitcom Writer in 2021. Both are mix of comedy and religious commentary.

== Sitcom Geek ==
Cary has been blogging and podcasting about the mechanics of writing sitcoms, in his blog Sitcom Geek since 2010, and his podcast since 2015, Sitcom Geeks with fellow comedy writer Dave Cohen.

== Personal ==
Cary has a degree in Theology from Durham University (Hatfield College).

In April 2017, he was identified as one of the very few pro-Brexit comedians in the United Kingdom, noting that other comedians should be wary of suggesting that people sharing these views might be 'backward, nationalistic and patriotic and racist'.
