= Colin Weston =

British broadcaster

Colin Weston (born 26 July 1948) is an English broadcaster, best known for his work at Granada Television and Tyne Tees Television.

== Biography ==
Born on 26 July 1948, in London, Weston attended Streatham Modern School in Lambeth. Upon leaving school, he began working in the press and publicity department of ABC Weekend TV's studios in Teddington and stayed with the company for four years. After ABC lost its weekend franchises in 1968, he applied for various continuity announcing roles around the ITV network.

Weston was successful at Granada, which had won the seven-day franchise for North West England. He was trained by then-chief announcer Don Murray Henderson. However, on his first announcing shift, he earned the nickname Fluff after forgetting the name of the Winter Hill transmitter during the opening authority announcement, despite it being taped to his desk.

After 18 months, Weston's contract with Granada was not renewed but he moved onto Anglia Television in Norwich, spending four years at the station before going freelance, working for BBC Television, LWT, HTV, Westward, Border and Southern. His most notable freelance stint came at Tyne Tees, which he joined permanently in 1979.

Weston continued to freelance after returning to Granada in the early 1980s, when in-vision continuity had been introduced to the station. Weston had become one of the best known television personalities in North West England, winning many fans for his unique style of announcing. His duties at Granada extended when he became Chief Announcer, leading a team of contemporaries including Andrew Brittain, John MacKenzie, Beverley Ashworth, Pamela Dodd and Roger Tilling.

Weston was the announcer on Friday, 12 February 1988, the evening of the last closedown from Granada before the start of 24-hour transmissions, and then for seven years, he provided continuity for the part-networked Night Time service, broadcast in the Border, Grampian, Granada, TSW, Tyne Tees and Ulster regions.

Alongside all other Granada announcers, until 1992, Weston also read regional news bulletins throughout the day. He also voiced Granada-produced networked trails and promos for the ITV network and made a cameo appearance during the first series of the long-running Granada sitcom, Watching, in 1987.

In 1998, Granada's presentation operation moved to the studios of Yorkshire Television in Leeds. Not wanting to make a move to Yorkshire, and having been made redundant, Weston left Granada after an announcing career spanning 30 years.

Aside his television career, he has also worked for Piccadilly Radio in Manchester and Radio City in Liverpool.

Weston works as a film extra and voiceover artist for videos and commercials and presents on community radio stations in Greater Manchester, previously at NMFM and now at Salford City Radio on Thursday evenings at 7.00.
