= Scott Hoatson =

Scottish actor (born 1984)

- Born: Scott William Hoatson; 23 December 1984 (age 41); Portobello, Edinburgh, Scotland
- Occupation: Actor
- Years active: 2002–present

Scott William Hoatson (born 23 December 1984 in Portobello, Edinburgh, Scotland) is a Scottish actor best known for portraying Rocket (aka Private Euan Armstrong) in the BBC Three comedy drama Bluestone 42.

== Early life and education ==
Hoatson was born and raised in Portobello, Edinburgh, where he attended Duddingston Primary and Portobello High School. He studied Drama and trained as an actor at Queen Margaret University School of Drama in Edinburgh.

== Career ==
Prior to Bluestone 42, his television appearances included the 100th episode of crime drama Taggart, and one episode of BBC prime time drama series Case Histories Hoatson fronted the television advertising campaign for Scottish supermarket chain Farmfoods in 2008. In 2011 Hoatson played the part of Carl in The Wicker Tree, director Robin Hardy's follow-up to his 1970s film, The Wicker Man.

Scott is also BBC One & Two Television continuity announcer.

Scott has appeared in recent global tours to the USA, Canada, Dubai, Australia and Hong Kong playing Harry Potter in the Olivier nominated theatre show Potted Potter.

Radio appearances included BBC Radio 4's production of MacMillan's Marvelous Motion Machine and BBC Radio Scotland's Sybil Law.

Hoatson played lead roles in several theatrical productions, including the part of Cuddy in The Empty Space's 2011 production of Heartbreak Soup and Davie Balfour in Cumbernauld Theatre's 2012 production of Kidnapped by Robert Louis Stevenson. In 2008, Hoatson played "Barry" in D.C. Jackson's award-winning play, The Wall. He reprised the role of Barry in Jackson's 2010 follow-up, The Chooky Brae. Hoatson currently lives in London.

He has previously lived in the United States of America in Washington DC.
