= Chas Early =

British actor and playwright

Chas Early is a British actor and playwright. He has appeared on TV shows such as Casualty, EastEnders, Skins, Mayo and Call the Midwife. He is probably best known for portraying the late comedian Bill Hicks in his one-man show, Bill Hicks: Slight Return. In September 2021, he portrayed Andy Goddard in an episode of the BBC soap opera Doctors.

== Works ==
- Bill Hicks: Slight Return Apollo Shaftesbury Avenue, London and Australian Tour 2008 (2005, written with Richard Hurst, about the US comedian)
- Moon the Loon (2006, with Martin Keady, about Keith Moon, the drummer of The Who).
- The Edinburgh Love Tour (Pleasance Courtyard Edinburgh 2005, written with Richard Hurst)
