= Adrian Finighan =

Welsh journalist

- Born: Adrian Richard Finighan; 20 December 1964 (age 61); Newport, Monmouthshire, Wales
- Occupations: Newsreader, journalist and reporter
- Years active: 1983–present
- Known for: Al Jazeera English

Adrian Richard Finighan (born 20 December 1964) is a Welsh journalist, working as a presenter and reporter for the television channel Al Jazeera English (AJE). He is now based at AJE's World headquarters in Doha but has also presented programmes from London.

Finighan's interest in broadcast news journalism began in his early teens. After leaving school, he was offered the chance to study 'on the job' for a recognised journalism qualification with the South Wales radio station where he had been working part-time since the age of 16.

After a period at a local radio station in Norwich, Finighan joined the BBC in 1988, working at BBC Local Radio as a reporter and producer. He later moved on to national radio, becoming a newsreader on BBC Radio 1 and BBC Radio 2 and an occasional presenter of the latter station's overnight programmes in the final years when the station's newsreaders were used in this role. Subsequently, he moved into television news by joining the BBC's Business Unit, and also fronted Newsroom South East. He later became a regular presenter on international news channel BBC World News, as well as appearing on UK domestic counterpart, BBC News 24. He joined CNN International from the BBC in early 2006 and worked there until 2010. He also owns a company with his brother.

Finighan made a short appearance as a news anchor in the film V for Vendetta (2005).
