= Kelly-Anne Smith =

British voice-over artist and presenter

Kelly-Anne Smith (born 9 July 1979 in Winchester, Hampshire) is a voice-over artist and presenter based in London. Smith is a continuity announcer for Channel 5 in the UK. She started as a radio presenter and was the Drivetime DJ on national station Virgin Radio.

== Education ==
Smith has a BA Communication, Culture and Media from Coventry University. Whilst at university she created the student radio station Phoenix Radio now known as Source Radio.

== Early career ==
Smith started with a work placement at local Coventry radio station Kix96 whilst at university and was also a broadcast assistant for BBC CWR. In June 2001 she began hosting the breakfast show at Loughborough station Oak FM. From there she moved to the East Midlands regional station Century 106. She presented the new music evening show, interviewing new bands and doing live sessions.

== Virgin Radio ==
Smith joined Virgin Radio in 2003 to present a brand new evening show "Most Wanted". Being sandwiched in between Daryl Denham and Jeremy Kyle. After five months of being on the station, she was promoted to the drivetime slot. Kelly-Anne did a lot of the interviews for the station and at the Isle of Wight Festival and V festival including Roger Daltrey, Pink and Hollywood superstar Will Smith. She has since returned to cover at the station as Virgin Radio and more recently as Absolute Radio.

== Radio voice-over ==
Smith's radio branding voice work includes Global Radio's Capital network, in London and across the UK and Bauer Radio Big City Network. She was the imaging voice for the Virgin Radio Canada network, which won an RAP Gold award for imaging. She voiced the Free Radio Network in the UK, and is on stations in Pakistan, Canada, Switzerland and France as well as across America as the voice of Akon's Hitlab Radio Show and the Remix Top 30 Countdown with Sean Hamilton.

== Continuity ==
Smith started as a continuity announcer for Five Life (now 5Star). She went to Sky One as a live announcer briefly but then moved to Channel 5 as a live continuity announcer on their public broadcasting channel. She is always the announcer around CSI and once interviewed the elusive William Petersen for a CSI special. She is also a continuity announcer for BBC Entertainment, Sky Atlantic, TLC (TV channel) and Sony Entertainment Television (UK & Ireland).

== On-screen ==
Smith presents on the Game of Thrones Thronecast for Sky Atlantic where she interviews the cast. Kelly-Anne presented coverage of the Eurovision Song Contest 2013 for MSN International
