= Karen Petch =

English broadcaster and journalist (1969–2019)

Karen Armstrong (19 June 1969 – 21 June 2019), known professionally as Karen Petch, was an English broadcaster and journalist, best known for her work with ITV Yorkshire.

Petch was a presenter for 96.9 Viking FM in Hull before moving to Leeds to become a continuity announcer for Yorkshire Television during the 1990s. Whilst working in continuity, Petch also worked as a relief in-vision announcer on Tyne Tees Television.

She later switched from YTV's Presentation department to the newsroom, as a reporter and presenter for the regional news programme Calendar, fronting many of the short Calendar News bulletins, including the opt-out service for the East of the region. She was also a presenter for short-lived digital lifestyle channel Wellbeing in 2001.

Petch died in June 2019 at the age of 50 after a battle with breast cancer.
