= Alec Monteath =

British actor (1941–2021)

Alexander William Monteath (22 May 1941 – 9 March 2021) was a Scottish television actor and broadcaster. He was best known for playing the part of crofter Dougal Lachlan in Take the High Road from 1980 until 1992.

Monteath was born in Doune, Perthshire on 22 May 1941. He was a graduate of the Glasgow College of Dramatic Art and went on to act at leading Scottish theatres (including Kilmarnock, Pitlochry and Perth) before entering broadcasting. His wife, Caroline Grant, was also an actress. Their eldest son David Monteath is an actor and has appeared in Coronation Street, Dramarama, Take the High Road and Endeavour amongst various other TV shows and films.

Monteath's earliest acting appearances on TV were in a half-hour drama for St. Andrew's Day called Rory Aforesaid in 1961, where he appeared as an extra alongside Hannah Gordon followed by guest roles in episodes of Witch Wood and Judith Paris (both 1964) and appeared in an episode of Scottish Playbill as a TV announcer in 1966.

Monteath joined Scottish Television as an continuity announcer and newsreader in 1964. After doing some relief announcing for the first two years, Monteath was brought in as STV's new weekday announcer in the Autumn season of 1966, then joined the announcing team at BBC Scotland in 1969. In addition to his announcing and newsreading duties on TV and radio, Monteath presented some radio shows on Radio 4 Scotland, including a weekly lunchtime show 'Twelve Noon' in the early 1970s.

After a season working at Pitlochry Festival Theatre (1963), Monteath returned to acting in the late 1970s, including two more seasons at Pitlochry (1976-1978). Some of his TV credits include appearances in The Omega Factor (1979); Grange Hill (1996); Taggart (1997); and Monarch of the Glen (2000), but he is perhaps best known as one of the original characters – Dougal Lachlan – in STV’s Take the High Road, a role he played for 12 years (1980 – 1992).

In January 1992, it was announced that his character would be retired from Take the High Road. Monteath said he was "paying the price for one too many rows with the series' scriptwriters".

In November 2021, it was announced by Equity that Monteath had died. His death occurred in Balfron, Stirlingshire on 9 March, at the age of 79.

== Bibliography ==
- Elder, Michael (1990). Ten Years of Take the High Road. London: Boxtree. ISBN 978-1-85283-109-7.
