= Kate Fraser (announcer) =

British television announcer

Kate Fraser is a former continuity announcer for Grampian Television and Scottish Television.

She joined Grampian in 1993 and remained until the station's presentation department closed in June 1998. During that time, she was also a presenter of Grampian Headlines (short local news bulletins), The Birthday Spot, the business interview programme The Buck Stops Here and the BAFTA-nominated Saturday morning children's programme Wize Up, alongside announcing colleagues Rachael Robertson and Scott Brown.

Fraser continued with announcing for Grampian when presentation and continuity was switched to Scottish Television in Glasgow - a move which also allowed her to start announcing for Scottish TV.

She left Scottish/Grampian during the early 2000s and is currently inactive in the television business.
