= Neville Wanless =

English broadcaster (1931–2020)

Neville Wanless (28 July 1931 – 4 December 2020) was an English broadcaster from North East England, best known for his work at Tyne Tees Television.

== Biography ==
Born in Wallsend-on-Tyne, Wanless was educated at St Bees School in the Lake District and trained at the London Academy of Music and Dramatic Art, where he won gold, silver and bronze medals for acting, verse speaking and elocution.

His broadcasting career started in 1961 as a freelance announcer and newsreader for the BBC Home Service's regional opt-outs in the North East and Cumbria, based in Newcastle. He continued with the opt-out bulletins (later broadcast as Radio 4 North East) until 1975.

Wanless joined Tyne Tees Television in 1971 as a continuity announcer, newsreader and promotions writer and as part of his announcing duties, he presented two daily features - the what's on guide Lookaround and The Birthday Spot for children.

Latterly, he became the station's longest serving announcer and held the posts of Senior Announcer and Head of Presentation until his retirement in 1988, when Bill Steel took over the role although he continued to be a relief announcer at Tyne Tees until around 1991.

Wanless also worked as a voiceover artist on TV and radio commercials and for corporate videos. During the early 1970s, he also freelanced as a continuity announcer at Border Television in Carlisle.

As an actor, he had a number of TV roles, including the drama series Spender and the Tyne Tees adaptation of the C. P. Taylor play And a Nightingale Sang in 1989. On stage, he appeared in productions at the Theatre Royal in Newcastle and other North East venues.

After retiring from television, Wanless continued his radio work, including stints with Radio Tees, Great North Radio and Century Radio North East. In later years, he hosted My Way, a Sunday evening show on hospital radio station Radio Tyneside, where he was a long-serving presenter.

Wanless died at North Tyneside General Hospital in North Shields on 4 December 2020, aged 89. He is survived by his wife, Pat, whom he married in July 1960, and their daughter Melanie.
