= Tony Currie (broadcaster) =

Scottish broadcaster and historian (1951–2026)

Tony Currie (5 December 1951 – 26 September 2026) was a Scottish broadcaster, historian and executive, best known for his work as a television continuity announcer and radio presenter.

== Career ==
From 1963 until his death, Currie ran Radio Six International, which went on to become an internet station and syndicated programming to 56 radio stations around the world. He presented various weekly shows, including Nothing But The Best and The Lively Lounge.

Currie began working at KPFK Radio in Los Angeles in 1972, before joining Scotland's first independent local radio station, Radio Clyde, the following year as its first voice on the air.

In April 1976, Currie joined Scottish Television as a continuity announcer, after freelancing at the station as a voiceover for trailers. He went on to become chief announcer, reading the daily lunchtime and late-evening Scottish News bulletins and during the regional news programme, Scotland Today.

After leaving STV in January 1987, he became Controller of Programmes for the Cable Authority and, latterly, cable programming controller for the Independent Television Commission.

In 1993, Currie led a failed bid for Radio Six to win the new regional FM license for Central Scotland as a 24-hour news and speech station. The consortium lost out to Scot FM (now Heart Scotland).

After a spell as chief executive of AsiaVision, he set up Irish satellite television station Tara Television as director of programmes before becoming chairman and chief executive of Cambridge Cafe Radio.

He then became a television announcer-director for BBC Scotland's television channels, BBC ONE Scotland and BBC TWO Scotland, until he officially retired in January 2020.

Currie took a year out from his TV work to schedule, produce, and present BBC Radio Scotland's overnight strand, Nightshift. As host of that programme, he was the first to broadcast from the Corporation's new headquarters at Pacific Quay, Glasgow.

He chaired both the Royal Television Society of Scotland and the Radio Academy in Scotland.

As a writer, he contributed to Radio Times, TV Times, The Guardian, The Herald, Scotland on Sunday, and the Glasgow Evening Times, and was a regular columnist for Broadcast magazine, Broadcast Systems International, The Times Educational Supplement, and Communications Monthly.

Currie wrote three published books: A Concise History of British Television, The Radio Times Story, and Not Quite Altogether Now!, in 2009 (the story of the launch and early days of radio Clyde).

In 2024, Currie acquired the company name and trademark of Pye Records, and relaunched the label, now based on the Scottish Isle of Lismore, with vinyl records pressed at Sea Bass Vinyl's wind-powered pressing plant in Tranent. The relaunched label's first release was Race the Sun by the Tony Currie Orchestra, conducted by Gavin Sutherland (principal guest conductor for the English National Ballet), and Callum Au. Race the Sun was conceived to pay tribute to the pop orchestras of the original Pye Records.

== Personal life and death ==
Currie was born in Ardrossan, on the North Ayrshire coast, on 5 December 1951.

In June 1975, he married Karin Spalter, a production manager who he met through his work in broadcasting. They had three children. Karin died in January 2023.

Currie died at his home at Port Ramsay on the Isle of Lismore, on 26 September 2026, aged 74, shortly after being diagnosed with tonsil cancer.
