= Allan Cartner =

Television continuity announcer

Allan Cartner (13 December 1933 – 24 October 1997) was a television continuity announcer, working primarily for Border Television.

Cartner, born and brought up in Carlisle, graduated from Durham University with a BA before starting his career in 1957 as an outside broadcast cameraman based at the BBC's Lime Grove studios in London and latterly, Manchester. He joined Border Television on 5 October 1961, five weeks after the station went to air for the first time. His first on-air link consisted of a five-minute long Farming Prices bulletin.

He would remain at Border Television for the next 27 years – 26 of those as chief announcer. Along with other Border TV announcers, Cartner read regular Border News bulletins during the day and until the mid-1980s, the main news round-up within Lookaround. He also presented Border Diary (a local events round-up), Pigeon Release Times (on Saturdays) and The First Day of The Week (a weekly Epilogue at close down on Sunday nights).

Cartner's voice was also heard on various Border-produced documentaries, networked as part of the daytime About Britain strand on ITV.

As well as working for Border, Cartner was a regular announcer for Tyne Tees Television during the 1970s. He returned to the Newcastle station as a freelancer after resigning from Border in 1988. Unlike other such announcers as Bill Steel and Kathy Secker, Cartner opted to make the majority of his announcements on Tyne Tees out-of-vision.

On 16 March 1996, Cartner made the last announcement from the Tyne Tees studios at City Road (where the station's continuity department was being closed down). He died 17 months later, aged 63.
