= Gary Terzza =

British television announcer (born 1960)

- Born: 24 January 1960 (age 66)
- Occupation: television announcer
- Years active: 1982–present
- Known for: continuity announcing for Channel 4

Gary Terzza (born 24 January 1960) is a British television announcer who is most commonly known for his continuity announcing for Channel 4.

Gary was raised in Nottinghamshire and now lives in Redbourn, Hertfordshire.

Gary worked on radio before becoming a continuity announcer for Central Independent Television in 1982 (including presenting Children's ITV between 1987 and 1988), before joining Channel 4 in 1991.
