= Peter Lewis (announcer) =

British television continuity announcer

Peter Lewis is a former British television continuity announcer. He was the first person to broadcast from London Weekend Television's new centre on the south bank of the River Thames, when it opened in 1971. He was promoted to senior announcer in 1977 and stayed in this role until 1997 when he left the station to pursue a management consultancy career in the United States.

== Life and career ==
Lewis was educated at school in his native city of Cardiff in Wales. His father, Bruce Lewis, had already been a presenter for Television Wales and West (TWW), where Peter Lewis began announcing during the mid to late 1960s. During this period, he became one of the youngest people on British television to present his own programme – Movie Magazine (the precursor to Cinema and Film Night) – an original idea devised by his father and Peter Duval.

Lewis joined London Weekend Television during its opening month in August 1968 and around the same time, freelanced for Yorkshire Television. Later, he concentrated on his work for LWT, becoming the first person to broadcast from the company's then-new South Bank Television Centre headquarters on the south bank of the River Thames in 1971.

In 1974, Lewis helped to launch the first independent commercial radio station in North East England – Metro Radio. Lewis was the station's first programming controller while his father was the first managing director and wrote the original proposal to the IBA for Metro and later for GWR in Swindon.

In 1977, Lewis was made chief announcer with LWT – a role which he remained until leaving the station in 1997. He returned to the station briefly in 1998 to record continuity links for the 30th anniversary weekend.

During his time at LWT, Lewis was a regular newsreader for London News Headlines (later LWT News Headlines) between 1982 and 1988. He also announced for HTV West on weekdays.

Lewis then moved to Tampa, Florida after a brief stint in Houston, Texas. He now runs a management consultancy company in Florida.
