= John Edmunds (presenter) =

British academic (1929–2023)

John David Edmunds (3 April 1929 – 3 May 2023) was a British academic who set up the Drama Department at the University College of Wales, Aberystwyth which he headed from 1973 to 1985. Edmunds trained as an actor but was best known as an ABC Weekend TV and Associated Rediffusion continuity announcer.

== Early years ==
John Edmunds was born in London on 3 April 1929 to Welsh parents. He attended Ardwyn Grammar School in Aberystwyth before attending the University College of Wales, Aberystwyth where he studied English and French in the late 1940s and early 50s, and where he also performed as an amateur actor before being asked to join a local repertory company during the holidays. Alongside his early TV announcing work, Edmunds was a part-time teacher in English. He taught at Battersea Grammar School in Streatham, London from the early to mid sixties. He also taught French at Henry Thornton Grammar School in Clapham in 1954 to 1955.

Edmunds was best known as an ABC Weekend TV and Associated Rediffusion continuity announcer who later presented BBC Children's TV's Top of the Form from 1966 to 1967. He was a BBC TV newsreader from September 1968 until September 1973, and then again in October 1974 and between September 1979 and June 1981. Edmunds also presented the BBC's regional London TV magazine, Town and Around from 1968 to 1969 and BBC Radio 4's You and Yours in 1972.

== Later career ==
From 1973 to 1985, Edmunds was head of drama at the University College of Wales, Aberystwyth, where his students included Neil Brand and Sharon Maguire. He was professor of drama at the University of the Americas, Mexico, and University of California, Santa Cruz, from 1985 to 1997.

Edmunds returned to the UK and appeared in several theatre productions, including his own drama, verse, and prose recitals. His translations of works by French dramatists Racine and Molière have been published by Penguin and performed on BBC Radio.

Edmunds also appeared in cameo roles in the films Lifeforce (1985), Love in Limbo (1993), Rendezvous with Zack (2000), and The Faces of the Moon (2002).

== Death ==
Edmunds died in Brighton on 3 May 2023, at the age of 94.
