= Keith Martin (broadcaster) =

British radio DJ and television broadcaster (1934–2024)

- Born: 2 April 1934; Sandwich, Kent, England
- Died: 21 February 2024 (aged 89)
- Other name: Gary Courtney
- Occupations: Radio DJ, television presenter and continuity announcer
- Years active: 1959–2024

Keith Martin (2 April 1934 – 21 February 2024) was a British disc jockey and broadcaster born in Sandwich, Kent, known for his involvement in UK pirate radio from its earliest days and extensive work as a television continuity announcer.

== Life and career ==
Keith Martin was born in Sandwich, Kent, England on 2 April 1934.

Martin was involved with offshore radio from the very earliest days of pirate radio in the United Kingdom. He worked as an announcer on the first pirate station to broadcast to the United Kingdom, the Radio Veronica English-language broadcast CNBC, which ran from 1960 to 1961. He recorded programmes for the subsequent ventures GBOK and GBLN (known as the Voice of Slough) in 1962, but these were never aired. Later he joined Radio Atlanta as a disc jockey, staying on until in 1964 when it merged with the offshore radio station Radio Caroline, at which point Martin presented broadcasts alongside then future BBC DJ Tony Blackburn from the MV Mi Amigo.

Following his stints in offshore radio Martin had a longer career as a continuity announcer for various TV stations, however not completely severing his links he broadcast on Radio 390 under the alternate moniker Gary Courtney. He worked regularly for ABC, the North and Midlands weekend contractor until 1968. From 1971 to 1998 he worked as an announcer for Anglia TV. He also announced for ATV, Yorkshire Television, Southern Television, Television South, LWT, Pearl and Dean, and the BBC. Martin subsequently became a voice coach with a client list that included British Prime Minister John Major.

Martin died from cancer on 21 February 2024, at the age of 89.
