= John Duncanson (broadcaster) =

Scottish TV presenter and journalist (1940–2020)

John Duncanson (14 April 1940 – 25 October 2020) was a Scottish television presenter and journalist, best known as a main anchor of Grampian Television's nightly regional news programme, North Tonight.

== Biography ==
Born in Prestwick and raised in Selkirk, Duncanson started his career in the theatre, initially in stage management before he became an actor.

Duncanson switched to television in 1964 when he joined Border Television in Carlisle as a continuity announcer. The following year, he moved to Ulster Television, before going onto work at ABC Weekend TV in Manchester and Birmingham - where his colleagues included David Hamilton and John Benson.

He went onto work at several ITV stations, including Anglia, Harlech Television (HTV) and Tyne Tees.

In December 1974, he joined BBC Scotland to co-anchor Reporting Scotland, initially from Glasgow, and later, Edinburgh. After two years, he switched to BBC radio, presenting programmes for the opt-out service 'Radio Highland'.

In 1979, Duncanson joined Grampian Television (now STV North) as a news reporter and presenter for the regional news programme Grampian Today. The following year, the programme was relaunched as North Tonight - with Duncanson anchoring initially alongside Selina Scott, followed by the likes of Anna Soubry, Anne MacKenzie and his eventual successor, Norman Macleod.

He continued to anchor the programme for eighteen years and signed off each edition by saying 'Oidhche Mhath' (Scots Gaelic for good night) to acknowledge Gaelic-speaking viewers, who originally did not have their own news programme.

Also during that time, he worked on a number of regional programmes - including North Tonight's summer spin-off Summer at Six - and contributed to Grampian's local and networked coverage of the ITV Telethons, Duncanson also covered irregular shifts as a relief continuity announcer at Grampian TV (often in-vision) on occasions of holidays, illness or other staff absences - where he would often read the lunchtime and evening Grampian news bulletins, announce the daytime and evening programmes as billed and close the station at around midnight with, of course, the friendly and reassuring closedown sequence when “we hoped you enjoyed our programmes today and you will join us again in the morning at 9.30am”.

He left Grampian in 1999, shortly after stepping down from North Tonight, but returned in 2001 to co-present a special to commemorate the programme's 21st anniversary, alongside Kirstin Gove, and again in 2011 to report on the station's 50th anniversary.

After retiring from broadcasting, Duncanson moved to Inverness, but he remained active in speech training and political campaigning.

On 25 October 2020, it was reported Duncanson had died at the age of 80, following a short illness.
