= Tracey Crawford =

Tracey Crawford (c. 1970) is a former British television continuity announcer and radio presenter.

Crawford, originally from Largs in North Ayrshire, began her career at Northsound Radio in 1989 as a producer of programming, promotions and commercials. While at Northsound, she joined Grampian Television (now STV North) in 1990 as a staff announcer and Grampian Headlines newsreader. At the time of her appointment, she was the youngest on-air announcer on British television, at the age of 19.

Crawford soon became a co-presenter of Northsound's breakfast show, alongside Grampian announcing colleague Robin Galloway. She continued in this role for four years.

Crawford left Grampian in 1995 to join Granada Television in Manchester as an announcer and trail voiceover. When presentation and transmission was moved from Manchester to Yorkshire Television in Leeds, she was one of two Granada announcers (alongside Roger Tilling) to make the move and in 1998, became the Head of Presentation for the Granada Media Group's ITV stations in Northern England and Southern Scotland - Granada, Yorkshire, Tyne Tees and Border. As well as managing other departments including continuity, trails & promos, weather and graphics, she continued to announce on occasions for the four stations.

Crawford left Leeds in October 2002 when the Leeds presentation department was scaled back to become a playout centre and soon became a presentation manager in London for the then-new ITV network continuity service, covering ITV regions in England and Southern Scotland, and later, Wales. She was also a business manager for ITV plc's Broadcast Business Development team before leaving ITV in 2007.

In 2008, Crawford became a partner of a company of entrepreneurs and consultants in creative business.
