= Philip Elsmore =

British actor and broadcaster (1937–2025)

- Born: Philip Robert Elsmore; 16 November 1937; Stourport-on-Severn, England
- Died: 3 August 2025 (aged 87); Richmond-upon-Thames, London, England
- Occupation: Actor, Television presenter
- Years active: 1963–2025
- Known for: Senior continuity announcer at Thames Television
- Spouse(s): Joan Scott (m. 1962–1988), Sabine Immenkamp (m. 2008)

Philip Robert Elsmore (16 November 1937 – 3 August 2025) was a British actor and broadcaster, best known for his role as senior continuity announcer for Thames Television between the station's launch in 1968 and its closure in 1992, having made both the first and last announcements for the station.

== Life and career ==
After National Service with the RAF in West Germany, he trained as an actor, playing minor roles and understudying at the Old Vic, followed by repertory and tours.

In 1963, he started work as a freelance continuity announcer and over several decades became one of Britain's most familiar voices lending his avuncular tones to a number of ITV franchisees including Border and Tyne Tees.

Elsmore was also a continuity announcer for ABC Weekend TV, which was the main influence and majority shareholder for what became Thames, and also announced for Southern Television at weekends while London Weekend Television was on the air in London. After 1992, he concentrated on reviving his original career as an actor, although he also freelanced as an announcer for Westcountry Television in Plymouth during the mid-late 1990s.

As an actor, Elsmore has played parts in various films and television series including The Bill, Lovejoy, The Governor, Casualty and Doctors.

While working for Thames, he also made cameo and guest appearances in networked productions such as Rainbow, Pauline's Quirkes, The Kenny Everett Video Cassette and Eric & Ernie's Christmas Show, often parodying his role as a continuity announcer. In the case of the latter, he held the distinction of appearing in Morecambe and Wise's last TV sketch.

Elsmore died in Richmond-upon-Thames, London on 3 August 2025, aged 87.
