= Jim Lee (broadcaster) =

- Born: James Lee; 21 April 1953 (age 72); Nuneaton, Warwickshire, England
- Occupation(s): Newsreader, announcer
- Known for: BBC Radio 4

James Lee (born 21 April 1953 in Nuneaton, England) is a freelance continuity announcer and newsreader on BBC Radio 4 as well as a presenter of links for BBC Radio 4 Extra. Lee is also an amateur radio licence holder in the U.K., operating with the callsign G4AEH.

== Early life ==
Lee was born in Nuneaton, England and lived in Camp Hill (to the west towards Hartshill). He went to the King Edward VI Grammar School in Nuneaton (now the King Edward VI College). He worked for two years in a bank, and then decided to go to college. At Liverpool Polytechnic (now Liverpool John Moores University), he studied business.

== Career ==
He worked in hospital radio at Walsgrave Hospital, and in 1980 was asked to join Mercia Sound in Coventry. He joined the BBC in 1989. He did the Breakfast Show on BBC CWR for 18 months from 1990, and then the Afternoon Show for two years. The BBC then decided to merge BBC CWR with BBC Radio WM in Birmingham.

In the early 1990s, he was involved in trials of DAB (Digital Audio Broadcasting – i.e. Digital Radio) as part of the Cambridge Digital Interactive TV Trial, but was made redundant on 2 May 1997.

=== Freelance ===
Shortly after he re-joined as a freelance continuity announcer on Radio 4 and the BBC World Service, and joined BBC Radio 7 in 2002. He is known for his distinctive accent, and often interjects humour into his announcements. After the Radio 4 UK Theme made it into the UK popular music charts in 2006, Lee introduced it by saying "You don't often hear a hit single on Radio 4 ... but here's the UK theme".
