= Graham Roberts (actor) =

English actor

- Graham Roberts on Calendar in 1993
- Born: 10 October 1929; Chester, Cheshire, England
- Died: 28 October 2004 (aged 75)
- Occupation: television announcer
- Years active: ?-1998
- Known for: YTV continuity announcer

Graham Roberts (10 October 1929 – 28 October 2004) was an English actor best known for his work on BBC Radio 3 and BBC Radio 4, including 31 years playing George Barford, the gamekeeper in Radio 4 soap opera The Archers. He was born and raised in Chester, and was educated at King's School in the city. Later, he studied at Bristol and later Manchester University.

He also appeared on film and television, including the series Z Cars.

He was also a continuity announcer with Yorkshire Television from its early days in the late 1960s until 1993. He retired from Yorkshire on the same day as Redvers Kyle, who had also been with YTV since its launch 25 years earlier, and both announcers made a rare in-vision appearance on the regional news programme Calendar to mark their retirement. He also worked at Grampian Television.

Roberts died on 28 October 2004, 18 days after his 75th birthday. His wife Yvonne survived him.
