= Louise Hulland =

British journalist and radio presenter

- Education: Clitheroe Royal Grammar School; St Chad's College, Durham
- Occupations: Journalist; broadcaster

Louise Hulland is a British broadcaster and journalist.

== Background ==
Hulland attended Read St John's Primary School, in Read, Lancashire, and Clitheroe Royal Grammar School. Whilst at secondary school, she carried out work experience at the Clitheroe Advertiser. She was a student at St Chad's College of Durham University where she read criminology and theology.

== Career ==
Hulland's media career began at the Clitheroe Advertiser. Her career in radio started at BBC Radio Lancashire. Hulland worked at BBC Radio 1 in the mid-2000s. Whilst at BBC Radio 1, Hulland was a researcher on various shows. Hulland was awarded a 2005 Sony Radio Academy Award for her BBC Radio 1 documentary, Missing the Message, which explored the experiences of teenagers who were HIV positive.

In the 2010s and possibly later, Hulland presented and produced in-depth reports for various TV programmes. In the early half of the 2010s, Hulland appeared regularly on Simon Lederman's programme on BBC London 94.9 as a commentator, and sat in for other presenters on BBC Radio Cambridgeshire. From 2015 until 2017 at the earliest, she continued to sit in for other presenters on BBC Radio Cambridgeshire and other BBC Local Radio stations.

By 2014, Hulland had been a continuity announcer or voiceover for QVC, Trouble TV, Channel 1 and BBC Three. As of 2014, Hulland was producing and presenting a number of documentaries for London Live. Also in 2014, Hulland played a TV news reporter in the television series Babylon. In the latter half of the 2010s, Hulland appeared on Mysteries at the Museum, a programme on the Travel Channel. As of 2018, Hulland was a reporter for Woman's Hour on BBC Radio 4.

In 2020, she began presenting the Friday and Sunday breakfast shows on BBC Radio Cambridgeshire between 6am and 10am. In 2023, it was announced that Hulland would present the new 2pm-6pm weekday afternoon show, covering three counties in the East of England, on BBC Radio Suffolk, BBC Radio Norfolk and BBC Radio Cambridgeshire. At Christmas 2023, Hulland presented a special programme which was broadcast on all BBC Local Radio stations.

Hulland has presented the ITV2 programme FYI Daily and presented for the ITN YouTube channel. She has presented the news on BBC Radio 6 Music.

=== Writing ===
Hulland writes for HuffPost and Independent Voices. She is a regular newspaper reviewer for Talkradio and BBC Radio London. Hulland's first book, Stolen Lives, which investigated human trafficking in the UK, was published in 2020.

=== Narration work ===
- Kate & Wills: A Royal Love Story (2010)
- The Killer in My Family. (2019–2024)
