= Anne Scott (journalist) =

Anne Scott is a former broadcast journalist with Grampian Television, Anglia Television, Sky TV and the BBC.

== Life ==
After a postgraduate diploma in journalism studies, she began her career as a reporter with the Grimsby Evening Times. After two years she moved to BRMB Radio in Birmingham to work as a reporter and news reader under Brian Shepherd.

During the early 1990s, Scott was a news reporter for Anglia Television, covering North Cambridgeshire, South Lincolnshire and West Norfolk from a newsroom in Peterborough. She was one of the launch reporters for the sub-regional news programme Anglia News West.

In the mid nineties, she moved to Grampian Television (now STV North) and became a reporter and a presenters of North Tonight.

Scott was a reporter for Sky News before joining BBC Scotland as a radio news reader, television broadcast continuity announcer and transmission director. She retired in 2020.
