= Kerrie Gosney =

British television presenter (born 1976)

Kerrie Gosney (born 9 June 1975) is an English weather presenter employed by ITV Yorkshire.

== Personal life ==
She is originally from the Hope Valley in Derbyshire.

== Career ==
Gosney undertook a Film, Media and Communication degree at Sheffield Hallam University and graduated in 1998.

Gosney joined Granada Media Group (now ITV plc) in May 2000 as a continuity announcer at Yorkshire Television studios in Leeds, where she provided links for Border, Granada, Tyne Tees and Yorkshire. In November 2002, she became a weather presenter for the aforementioned regions.

On 1 August 2022 she was promoted to lead weather presenter for Yorkshire.
