= Tom Edwards (broadcaster) =

British radio presenter (1945–2025)

- Born: 20 March 1945; Norwich, England
- Died: 25 October 2025 (aged 80); Lincoln, England
- Occupations: Radio presenter; Television announcer
- Years active: 1960s–2025
- Known for: Radio City; Radio Caroline; BBC Radio 1; BBC Radio 2; Thames Television
- Notable work: Is Anybody There (autobiography)

Tom Edwards (20 March 1945 – 25 October 2025) was a British radio presenter and television announcer, known for his work on offshore pirate radio stations Radio City and Radio Caroline in the 1960s, and for his later career with BBC Radio 1, BBC Radio 2 and television networks, including Thames Television, ATV and HTV West. He started his career as a journalist on the Eastern Evening News before transitioning to broadcasting and became a prominent voice on British radio. He also worked as a television newsreader and announcer. He later overcame personal struggles with alcoholism and chronicled his life in an autobiography Is Anybody There.

== Early life and career ==
Edwards was born in Norwich. His father, who ran a grocery business, died when he was five. He began work as a teenager, writing a music column for the Eastern Evening News. He went to drama school in London and began a career in broadcasting in 1963 when he became a presenter of the Border Television music programme Beat in the Border.

In 1964 he was working as a bluecoat entertainer at a Pontins holiday camp in Suffolk when he heard offshore pirate radio station Radio Caroline for the first time, broadcasting from a ship off the coast of East Anglia. Edwards, who had "always loved music", was inspired to create his own 'radio station' on the camp's loudspeaker system in imitation of Caroline's style and format, and he sent a tape of his show to another pirate radio station, Radio City, which was broadcasting from a wartime army tower off the coast of Kent. In September 1965, aged 20, Edwards was taken on by Radio City and became the station's chief presenter. In February 1967 Radio City was shut down by the government and Edwards moved to Radio Caroline South on the ship Mi Amigo, which in turn was closed down in August 1967.

He joined the BBC in late 1967 as a television newsreader and presenter on a nightly news programme BBC Look East and in 1968–1969 presented the Saturday morning BBC East regional radio programme Happy Weekend, Everybody. In 1968 he started working for BBC Radio 1, initially replacing Simon Dee on Midday Spin and later became a staff announcer and newsreader on both Radio 1 and BBC Radio 2.

In 1970 he presented the weekday morning regional opt-outs from the Today programme on BBC Radio 4 called This is East Anglia. During the 1970s he presented Radio 2 programmes including the weekday and Saturday Early Show, Night Ride, Music Through Midnight, Radio 2 Ballroom and shows featuring the BBC Radio Orchestra. In the late 1970s he went freelance and was an in-vision announcer for Thames Television for most of the 1980s, also working for ATV and HTV West.

Edwards moved to Los Angeles and hosted a weekly show called 'Hollywood Stars'. He also worked as a DJ, and on the strength of his English accent appeared in a television adaptation of Jules Verne's 'Around the World in 80 Days'. He returned to Britain in the early 1990s and presented BBC Radio Norfolk's 'Look East'. He lost his job in 1992 and a "long tussle with alcohol and cocaine" eventually led to living on the streets and begging. After three years in rehab in Lincolnshire recovering from alcoholism, he was given a job by his friend Bob Monkhouse as the voice-over artist on the game show Wipeout in the late 1990s.

In 2009, Edwards and David Clayton, editor of BBC Radio Norfolk, compiled an hour-long story of his life titled Edwards the Confessor. In 2018 Edwards published a memoir of his life titled Is Anybody There? In 2022 he auctioned off "half a century of showbiz memorabilia".

== Personal life and death ==
Edwards lived in the village of Heckington in Lincolnshire for nearly 30 years. He moved to Lincoln shortly before his death to be nearer to medical facilities.

His autobiography, "Is Anybody There" was published by Kaleidoscope on 8 December 2018. (Edwards used to open his radio show by knocking on the microphone three times and saying: "Is anybody there?") During an interview to promote the book, he said, "My book is a turbulent read but I hope you enjoy it, and you can join me on a journey that took me here, there and just about everywhere."

The book related his varied career as a DJ in pirate and commercial radio, as a TV broadcaster working for the BBC and several other TV companies, and a period in Hollywood. The book also described Edwards' personal battle with alcohol and drug addiction, which he successfully overcame after spending three years in a rehabilitation centre in Lincolnshire.

Edwards died in a hospice in Lincoln in October 2025, aged 80, after a long battle with cancer.

Tom Edwards ashes were scattered by Shimmering Sands fort from P S Waverley Paddler Steamer on Sunday 11th October 2026
