= Pat Doody =

British television announcer

Patrick Doody (11 November 1938 – 28 February 1990) was a British broadcaster.

Born in Birmingham, his father was the owner of a theatre company. Doody chose to go into broadcasting work rather than acting. After serving time in the Royal Signals, he began his career with the British Forces Broadcasting Service in Cyprus. He later moved to BBC Radio, where he became best known for presenting Night Ride for Radio 1 and Radio 2.

Doody moved into television and worked as a continuity announcer for Border Television in Carlisle and Tyne Tees Television in Newcastle, latterly becoming Senior Announcer at Border. He freelanced at LWT and voiced many local commercials for Metro Radio in Newcastle. His voice was also heard as the announcer of Border's popular networked series, Mr. and Mrs. He also ran his own broadcast facilities company, Videoforce Ltd.

Doody died from carbon monoxide poisoning on 28 February 1990 at the age of 51. An inquest heard that he had money problems and was found dead in a fume-filled car in his garage by his second wife Jill He was on announcing duty at Border two nights before his death.

== Microbe ==
The 1969 single "Groovy Baby" by Microbe featured the voice of Pat Doody's then three-year-old son, Ian. The song was written by Chris Andrews and came about after Ian, brought into Radio 1 from time to time by his father (who was employed as the station's newsreader at the time), appeared on-air uttering late 1960s slang such as 'Groovy' on shows hosted by radio presenters such as Dave Cash. Cash heavily championed the record (and was involved with the recording of the B-side "Your Turn Now" credited to the Microbe Ensemble), which resulted in the record spending seven weeks in the UK charts, with a peak of number 29. This makes Ian Doody the youngest male artist ever to get a top 40 hit in the UK charts (as seven month old Jessica Smith appeared on the Teletubbies' number one hit in 1997).
