= Alan Smith (radio presenter) =

Newsreader and media presenter

Alan Smith is a British radio presenter and newsreader. He can be heard on BBC Radio 4, as well as sister station Radio 4 Extra. He is well known as one of the readers of the Shipping Forecast, which NPR called "a national institution, almost as much as Manchester United".

== Career ==
Smith got his start in broadcasting in 1989 and has been on the air daily for over three decades. He joined BBC Radio 4 as an announcer in 2002 after presenting on regional radio programmes such as the Lamb Bank on BBC Radio Cumbria, as well as a daily phone-in and specialist music shows.

Alan Smith is well known as one of the voices of the BBC Radio 4 Shipping Forecast. In 2007, he gained recognition in British tabloids and music magazines for his "soothing tones" when the British DJs The Young Punx sampled his voice reading the Shipping Forecast on their hit single "Rockall".

== Personal life ==
Born in the Simpson Memorial Maternity Pavilion, Edinburgh, Scotland, Alan Smith moved with his family to the Lake District in Cumbria when he was two. As a child, he was an extra in the 1974 film Swallows and Amazons.
