= Scott Brown (broadcaster) =

British television presenter

Scott Brown is a Scottish television producer.

Brown, a former local radio presenter, was a continuity announcer for Grampian Television (now STV North) during the mid – late 1990s. He also presented various regional programmes including Grampian Headlines regional news bulletins, the BAFTA-nominated children's programme Wize Up alongside announcing colleagues Rachael Robertson and Kate Fraser and the antiques show Under The Hammer alongside Fiona Armstrong – a programme he continued to present after Grampian's in-house presentation department was closed during the summer of 1998.

In March 1999, Brown teamed up with Bill Shand, a resources supervisor and studio director for STV North, to form Midas Multimedia, an Aberdeen-based company specialising in television & video production and media training.

Brown runs Midas Multimedia alongside former Grampian/BBC Scotland presenter & producer Patricia Macleod.
