= Sue Powell-Reed =

Welsh Radio & Television Broadcaster

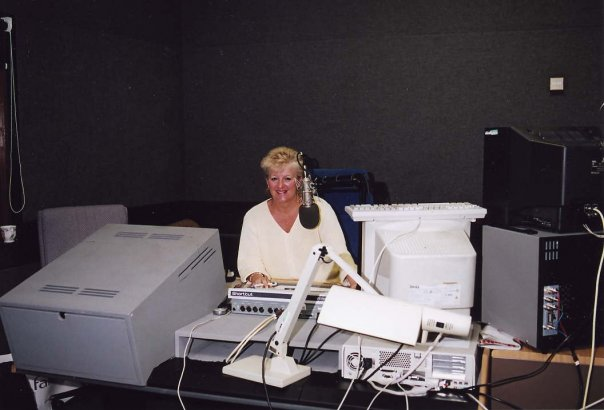
Sue Powell-Reed at the HTV Studios

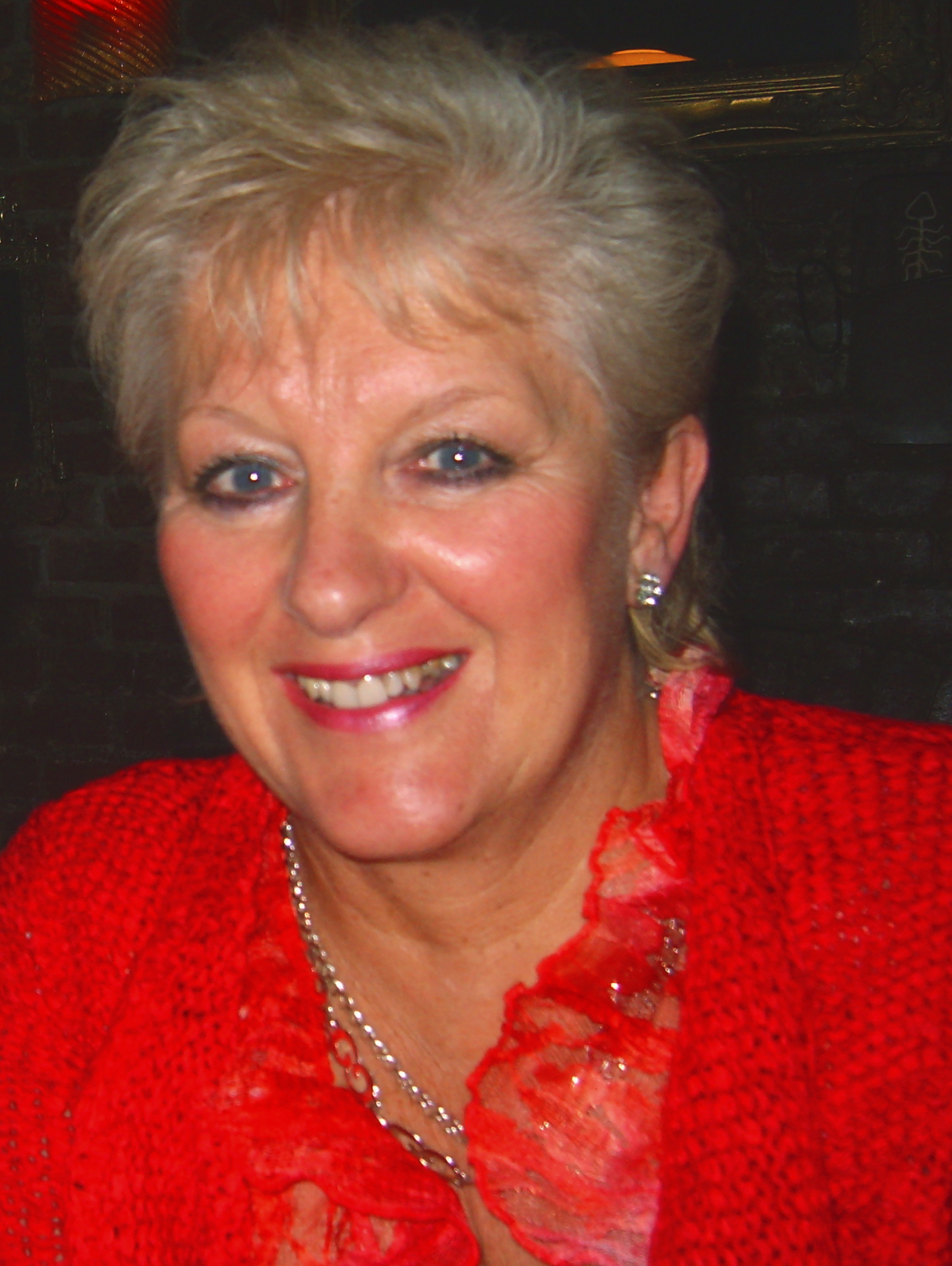
Sue Powell-Reed

Sue Powell-Reed was a Welsh Radio & Television Broadcaster and now heads up two corporate companies, Vibe Live Limited and SSC Europe Limited.

Sue Powell-Reed was born in Swansea, and spent her childhood and teens studying at the Llwyn-y-Bryn grammar school where she developed her love for Speech, Drama and became a keen sports player. Sue quickly excelled in swimming and by the age of 13 won the title of Welsh Individual Medley Swimming Champion. Sue was the captain of several sports teams at her school, and this along with her love of the arts would later help her become the Sports Presenter for HTV.

After leaving Llwyn-y-Bryn Sue Powell-Reed began a course at Barry Teachers Training College. However Sue left after a short time and instead graduated as a Speech & Drama Teacher (LLAM)at the London Academy of Dramatic Arts, and also became an Associate (AVCM Hons) of The Victoria College of Music & Drama.

Sue by now had gained qualifications as a Swimming, Speech and Drama instructor and launched her media career working for the South Wales Evening Post as a features writer and a contributor to local radio station Swansea Sound/The Wave.

In 1980, Sue joined HTV Wales as a sports correspondent and was the first female TV sports correspondent in the UK.

Later, Sue went on to become the station's longest-serving staff announcer and a familiar face on Welsh Television. From 1990, she also read regular HTV Wales News bulletins and read the weather reports as part of her duties.

On 15 January 2006, Sue Powell-Reed made the final announcement when continuity from Wales was discontinued.

After leaving ITV Wales, she and announcing colleague Leighton Jones set up the audiobook company Audio Stories for Kids for which she managed the creative side of the business. Before starting her own production company Vibe TV.

Vibe Live (Formally known as Vibe.TV) has been trading since 2008 and is based in Swansea Marina.

The company works on projects with Broadcasters, Organisations, Authorities, Associations and Universities.

Sue Powell-Reed is CEO of the Vibe Brand and continues to play a part within the local and broader media through Voice Overs, Appearances and Talks.

In 2018, Sue opened a sister company called SSC Europe Limited which specialises in outdoor digital billboard signage.
