= Bob Christie (announcer) =

Bob Christie (born 1941) is a former Scottish continuity announcer, newsreader and programme presenter.

Christie began his broadcasting career as an hospital radio presenter with HBS Glasgow (Hospital Broadcasting Service) in the 1960s then went onto work with Scottish Television as an continuity announcer and newsreader in the early 1970s before joining BBC Scotland in January 1973 as an announcer for the Radio 4 Scotland opt-out service (replaced in 1978 by BBC Radio Scotland) and BBC Scotland's television opt-outs, In his last few years with the BBC, Bob tended to work on radio rather than TV.

Christie also worked as a part-time religious programme presenter at various churches across Scotland on BBC Radio 2's Sunday Half-Hour and BBC One's Songs of Praise programmes (some network, some Scotland only) throughout the early-mid 1970s, Bob was a Christian and regularly worshipped at St George's Tron church in Glasgow.

By 1977, Christie along with all other BBC Scotland announcers began to announce all evening and weekend afternoon television programmes, their duties were expanded in 1986, when the BBC Scotland announcers began to announce all daytime television programmes in addition to evening and weekend programming.

Until 1988, Christie regularly appeared in-vision as a Scottish News/Reporting Scotland bulletin presenter.

He retired from announcing in 2000.
