= Bill Steel =

British broadcaster, actor (born 1939)

- Born: Newcastle Upon Tyne, England
- Presenting career
- Show: ITV Tyne Tees, Metro Radio
- Style: Presenter
- Country: United Kingdom

Bill Steel (born 20 May 1939) is a broadcaster and actor from North East England, best known for his work at Tyne Tees Television and Metro Radio.

== Personal life ==
In April 2021, Steel's son Christian told BBC News that his father was suffering from Alzheimer's disease and was receiving end-of-life care.

== Career ==
=== Early career ===
Born in Newcastle upon Tyne, Steel was educated at Pendower Boys School in Newcastle and at Durham University.

He began his working life at the General Electric as a trainee accountant, and moved into television in the 1960s, first working in the Presentation department at Tyne Tees Television as an assistant transmission controller and at the age of 23, a presentation director. Later, he progressed into the advertising section, which involved doing voice over work for over 10,000 local adverts produced in-house.

In 1967, he moved to Manchester, where he presented weekend regional news bulletins for ABC Weekend TV. Steel later moved to ABC's Midlands operation in Birmingham and became its chief announcer until 1968, when the station's staff were redeployed to Thames Television in London, where ABC had a majority stake. There, Steel worked in various departments, most of which he had previous experience, such as commercial voice overs, newsreading and transmission control. Through his voiceover work, he ended up doing a short spell of continuity announcing for Thames, before returning to the north in 1971.

=== Tyne Tees Television ===
Employed once again by Tyne Tees, Steel worked as one of a number of presenters for the station's regional news programming and became its main anchor for the flagship 20-minute evening programme, Today At Six, and from September 1976, the newly launched Northern Life.

In 1980, Steel moved from news presenting back to continuity announcing for Tyne Tees, taking over as Chief Announcer in 1988, from incumbent Neville Wanless. Despite returning to announcing, he continued to read regular local news bulletins until the late 1980s.

Alongside Kathy Secker, he remained as one of the last Newcastle-based announcers until March 1996 when the station's owners, Yorkshire-Tyne Tees Television, centralised all Presentation operations in Leeds. Steel signed off from continuity announcing on 16 March 1996 - one of his colleagues, the late Allan Cartner, made the final announcement from the City Road studios later that night.

At Tyne Tees, he had also presented many programmes including Songs of the Swinging Sixties, The Birthday Spot and Lookaround. He also appeared as a features reporter during the late 1980s and 1990s; including the regional magazine shows Tyne Tees Weekend and Tonight. Steel continued his work as a features reporter until the end of 1996, when his contract with Tyne Tees was not renewed.

=== Radio ===
While working in the Tyne Tees newsroom, Steel was also a presenter on local radio. In 1973, he became the first breakfast show presenter of the North East's first commercial radio station, Metro Radio. Later, he went on to present The Bill Steel Show for BBC Radio Newcastle.

In 1994, Steel began presenting a weekly Sunday afternoon request programme for Gateshead-based Century FM. His work for the regional station later expanded into other weekend and evening slots. He continued presenting overnight shows at the weekend for Century until these were replaced with networked programming from Manchester in 2008.

=== Acting ===
As an actor, Steel developed a theatre career which included a nationwide tour of Side by Side by Sondheim, where he replaced Ned Sherrin as its narrator. He later performed as Professor Henry Higgins in My Fair Lady, the lead role of Herbie in Gypsy and The Dancing Years.

In 1997, he returned to television with an eight-month stint as Bernard McKenna in the ITV soap Coronation Street. That same year, he also appeared in Tyne Tees' adaptation of Catherine Cookson's The Rag Nymph as Mr. Sponge, the night school teacher.

After retiring from Tyne Tees, he still enjoyed occasional work as an actor.

In April 2021, Steel's son Christian told BBC News that his father was suffering from Alzheimer's disease and was receiving end-of-life care.
