= Charles Nove =

British radio broadcaster (born 1960)

- Born: Charles Alexis Nove; London, England
- Occupations: Radio broadcaster; voice artist
- Years active: 1976–present
- Employer: Boom Radio
- Known for: BBC Radio; Epic History
- Father: Alexander Nove

Charles Alexis Nove is a British radio broadcaster and voice artist, who currently presents the weekday breakfast show for classical music station Magic Classical. Earlier in his career, he was a newsreader and relief presenter for BBC Radio 2.

== Career ==
=== Early career ===
His earliest presentational experience was at Glasgow's Hospital Broadcasting Service in 1976. From 1981 he was a member of BBC Radio 2's continuity team and, in common with many of the station's announcers and newsreaders, he had many stints presenting the station's overnight and early morning output, culminating as regular host of the weekend overnight show for several years until 1998. For BBC television, Nove has been a co-presenter and announcer on the original Come Dancing, and announcer for the gameshow Wipeout in the 1990s. In 1991 he commentated for BBC One on the Lord Mayor's Show. He has also worked as a BBC TV continuity announcer and has presented radio programmes on various stations such as Jazz FM and Magic FM.

For several years, he was also the presenter of the EuroMix in-flight audio entertainment channel, exclusive to Emirates. Between 1995 and 2016, Nove was the stand-in for regular National Lottery announcer Alan Dedicoat.

=== Later career ===
In later years he provided holiday relief for Radio 2 and what used to be Saga Radio in Scotland, and following John Marsh's semi-retirement in February 2007 he became one of the regular newsreaders on Radio 2's flagship breakfast show Wake Up to Wogan until the end of its run in December 2009. Nove continued to read news on Radio 2 until his final bulletin on 8 September 2012. He was also the London studio technical operator when Terry Wogan presented his Radio 2 show from various locations around Europe during coverage of the Eurovision Song Contest, and during other outside broadcasts in the UK.

Nove is the co-owner of an AEC Routemaster bus, with Ken Bruce, Alan Dedicoat, Steve Madden and David Sheppard. On the Wogan show, Nove was known for his impersonation of Cyril "Blakey" Blake, the inspector from the 1970s television sitcom On the Buses.

Nove founded the A1 VOX audio recording studios in London in 1999, and was the company's managing director. The company entered voluntary liquidation in 2021.

From May 2011, Nove was a presenter on BBC Radio Oxford, where, until 2016, he presented the religious programme on Sundays between 6 and 9 am in addition to the Early Breakfast sequence on certain weekdays. Between March 2015 and December 2018 he presented Early Breakfast on Monday to Friday between 6 and 7 am, and was then a contributor to, and newsreader on, the main Breakfast Show.

Nove is a narrator for Toby Groom's YouTube channel Epic History which began on 10 March 2015.

Nove became a BBC Radio 4 continuity announcer in August 2018 but left in March 2019, when he began presenting the weekday breakfast show on the national digital station Scala Radio, subsequently renamed Magic Classical. In 2025 Nove joined Boom Radio as a presenter.
