= Jim Pope =

English announcer (1933–2001)

Jim Pope (2 October 1933 – 18 August 2001) was an English radio and television continuity announcer who was known for providing the announcements on Granada TV's University Challenge.

He began his career in radio and moved to TV to deliver continuity links for HTV in the 1960s and early 1970s. He later joined Granada TV where he devoted his career as a continuity announcer and newsreader of Granada Reports bulletins. He was also a narrator for the current affairs programme, World in Action.

Pope performed the role of voice-over announcer for Granada's University Challenge until his death in 2001, when he was succeeded by Roger Tilling.

Preceded by Don Murray Henderson; 1962–1972	University Challenge announcer 1972–2001	Succeeded by Roger Tilling; 2001–present
