= David Miles (radio announcer) =

British continuity announcer

David Miles (born 1954) is a British continuity announcer and newsreader on BBC Radio 4.

== Biography ==
David Miles joined the BBC in 1975 as a studio manager. Initially working at Bush House, he then transferred to Broadcasting House. Between 1983 and 12 June 1995, he worked as a BBC Television announcer. In the summer of 1995 he became an announcer on Channel 4, but he later rejoined Radio 4. He has also announced for the UK version of the History Channel.
