= ABC Weekend TV =

Former ITV service for Midlands & North England

ABC Weekend Television ABC Television Limited
- The two ABC regions when it lost its franchises in 1968
- Type: Region of television network
- Branding: ABC
- Country: United Kingdom
- First air date: 18 February 1956; 70 years ago in the Midlands; 5 May 1956 in the North West; 3 November 1956 in Yorkshire
- TV transmitters: Winter Hill; Emley Moor; Lichfield; Membury; Scarborough
- Headquarters: Manchester; Birmingham; London
- Broadcast area: Midlands North
- Owner: Associated British Picture Corporation
- Dissolved: 28 July 1968; 58 years ago
- Former names: Associated British Cinemas (Television) Limited
- Picture format: 405-line black and white
- Affiliation: ITV
- Language: English
- Replaced by: As ITV franchisee: Granada Television (North West); Yorkshire Television (Yorkshire); ATV (Midlands); As company: Thames Television

ABC Television Limited, popularly known as ABC Weekend TV, was a British broadcaster which provided the weekend service in the Midlands and Northern England regions of the Independent Television (ITV) network from 1956 to 1968. It was one of the "Big Four" companies that between them produced the majority of ITV networked programmes during this period.

Originally created as Associated British Cinemas (Television) Ltd, ABC was one of a number of commercial television companies established during the 1950s by cinema chain companies, in an attempt to safeguard their business by becoming involved with television, which was taking away their cinema audiences. In this case, the parent company was the Associated British Picture Corporation (ABPC)—owner of ABC Cinemas—which initially did not wish to become involved with the new broadcasting system, but was persuaded to do so by the Independent Television Authority (ITA) and the manager of its Pathé News subsidiary Howard Thomas, who became the new company's managing director.

ABC operated two franchises, one in the Midlands, which was the fourth ITA franchise to go on air, in 1956, and the other in the North of England, which was the sixth franchise to go on air, later the same year. It lost both its franchises in 1968, but merged with another franchisee to form Thames Television, which held the London weekday franchise for 24 years.

From 1967, ABC's sister company, ABC Television Films, used the name Associated British Corporation on its exports to the US, such as the last two series of The Avengers.

== History ==
=== Formation ===
When Kemsley-Winnick, one of the consortia that had been awarded two franchises in the new Independent Television network in 1954, collapsed, the ITA approached ABPC to step into the breach. The Corporation agreed to assume the franchises to broadcast on Saturdays and Sundays to the Midlands and the North of England. The contract agreeing to do so was signed on 21 September 1955, the day before Independent Television (ITV) began in London.

This left the new ABC five months to begin broadcasting in the Midlands, the service beginning on 18 February 1956. Soon afterwards, it was also up and running in the North; it began broadcasting in the North West on 5 May 1956, and in Yorkshire on 3 November 1956. It was aided in part by the failure of the original contractor; Kelmsley-Winnick had ordered over £1 million (equivalent to £22.7 million today) of production equipment from manufacturer Pye, which it sold to ABC at a much-discounted price.

=== Relations with ITA, ITN and ATV ===
==== ATV ====
The London weekend contractor had launched under the name "Associated Broadcasting Company" (ABC), but ABPC wanted to use the ABC brand for its own service, to match its existing ABC Cinemas brand, so it took legal action against the Associated Broadcasting Company who subsequently agreed to rename as Associated Television (ATV) after broadcasting for three weeks as "ABC". This allowed ABPC to launch its own station as "ABC".

==== ITN ====
ABC's late entry into Independent Television meant that some of the details of how the new system would run were already agreed between the ITA regulator and the other three contractors. ABC felt that some of these details were unfair on itself as the smallest contractor, and the only contractor that broadcast only at weekends.

In particular, ABC objected to paying one-quarter of the costs for ITN, provider of national news broadcasts for the network, as there would be fewer news programmes at the weekend than on weekdays. ABC's managing director Howard Thomas, former head of Pathé News, felt that ABC could provide its own news for a fraction of ITN's price, but the ITA would not allow this: regional companies were responsible only for regional news, and national news should be independent of the regional companies. ABC lobbied both ITN and the ITA for change, which eventually resulted in a cutback to the amount of programming to be provided by ITN to the network and a substantial reduction in ITN's costs.

==== Presentation ====
Once the "Big Four" companies were in profit, the ITA reviewed the performance each of them. ABC escaped with little criticism, except for its presentation, which was considered to be dull and too closely aligned with its sister "ABC Cinemas" brand. ABC took this to heart and launched a new look in September 1959.

==== ATV again ====
Of the original four ITV contractors, ABC had difficulty getting its programmes shown in the London region, which was hampering its reputation. Two of the other contractors had London franchises, and Granada seemed to have a good working relationship with Associated-Rediffusion to show its programmes. ABC found itself in a head-to-head battle with ATV, as, in the early years, these were the only two companies whose franchises operated at the weekend.

ATV had close connections with the Moss Empires theatre chain (through ATV's Val Parnell) and the Grade Organisation theatrical talent agency (through ATV's Lew Grade and his brother Leslie) and felt they had the expertise to make expensive, high-status drama, variety and comedy shows, and leave the cheaper "provincial" off-peak weekend programming to ABC. This would have been to ABC's financial disadvantage, since ABC (with its two regions to ATV's one region at the weekends) would have to pay two-thirds of the expensive costs of ATV London's shows, while ATV would pay only one-third of the costs of ABC's cheaper shows.

ABC fought back, first of all, by selling some of its pre-recorded shows to Associated-Rediffusion (instead of ATV) to broadcast to London on weekdays. Secondly, it refused to buy some of ATV's top-rated shows such as Sunday Night at the London Palladium and broadcast its own alternatives such as Blackpool Night Out. Eventually ATV gave way and agreed to buy more of ABC's shows.

=== Loss of franchise ===
Structural changes in the regional contract areas meant that ABC no longer had a contract to reapply for in 1967. The Northern area (split into North West and Yorkshire) was to become a seven-day operation, as would the Midlands. Existing weekday contractors (Granada and ATV respectively) were correctly considered the favourites. ABC consequently submitted two applications: one for the service for London at the weekend, the other for the Midlands seven-day operation, although it favoured the first contract.

It was expected that ABC would be awarded the weekend London licence, but the strength of another application (from the London Weekend Television consortium) ruled this out. This led to a situation where a successful company could be closed down through no fault of its own. To prevent this, the governing body of ITV, the Independent Television Authority, ordered a merger with the existing London weekday company Rediffusion, with ABC having majority control of the new operation.

Despite protests from Rediffusion, the two companies eventually became Thames Television. ABC ceased weekend broadcasting in the North and Midlands regions on Sunday 28 July 1968 and resumed on Tuesday 30 July in the London region as weekday company Thames.

== Studios ==
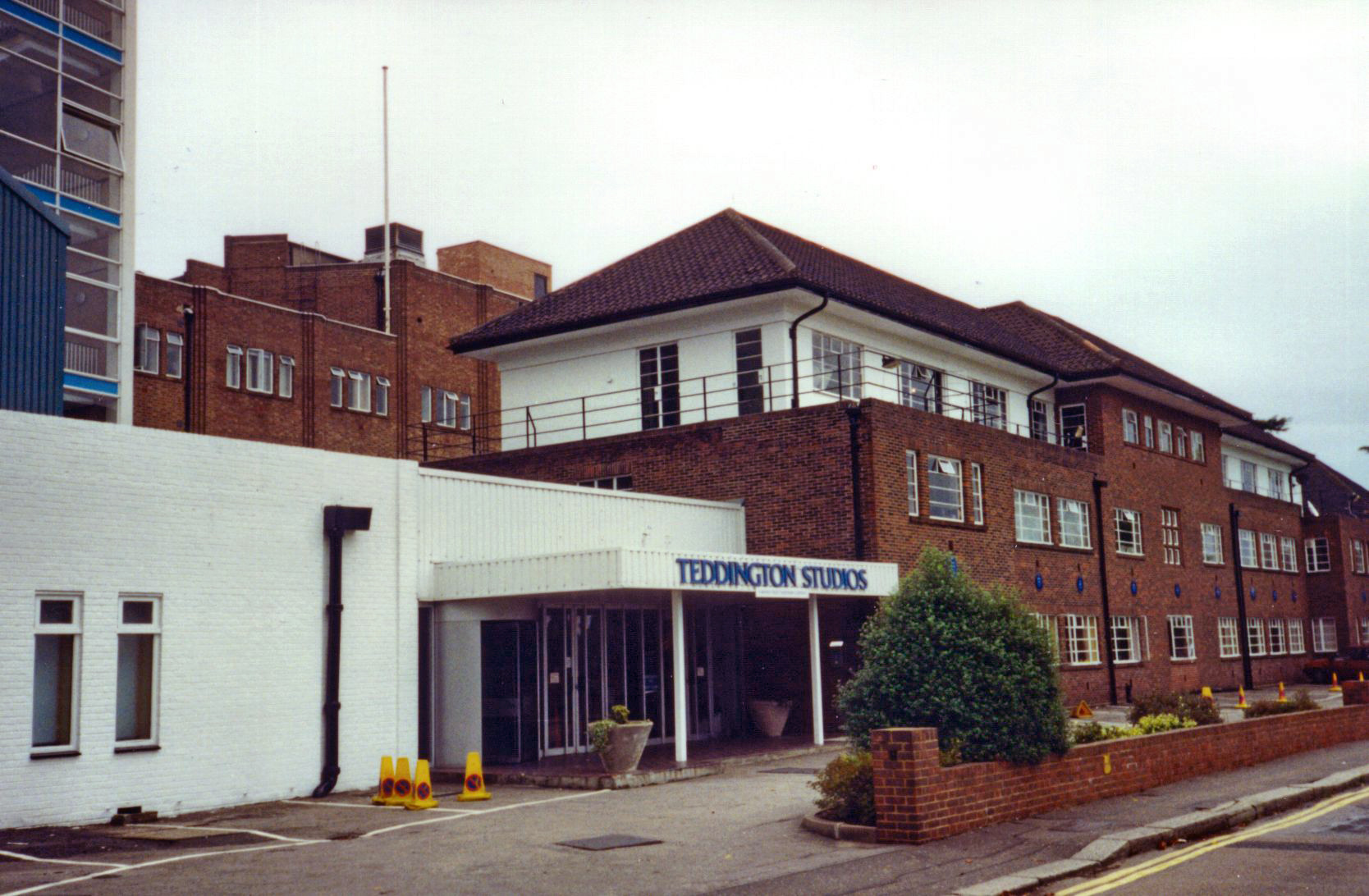
ABC's former studios in Teddington, Greater London.

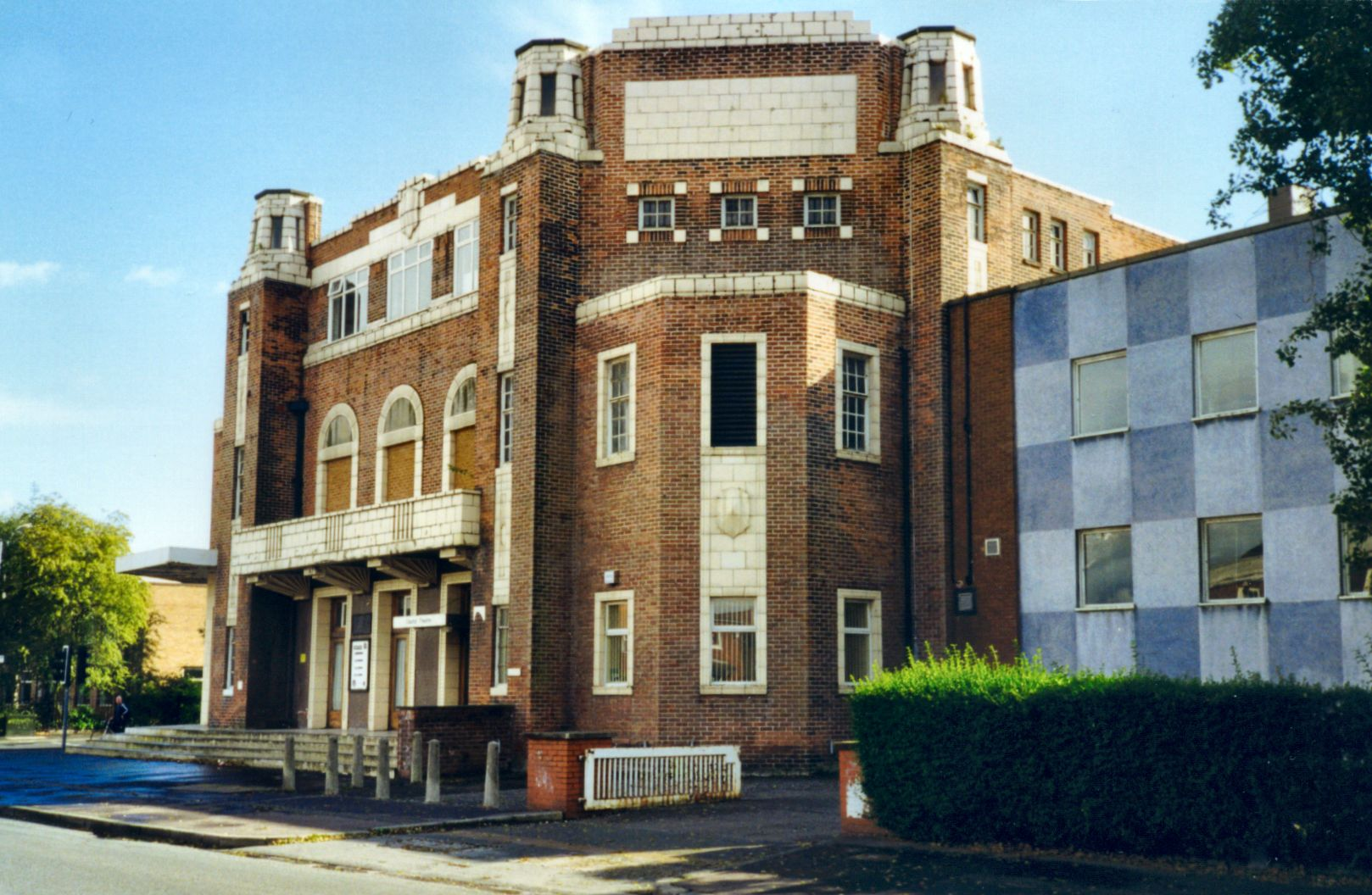
ABC's former studios in Didsbury, Manchester

ABC operated three production sites and had a further sales office. The main production facilities were the former Warner Studios in Teddington, Middlesex. Although this was outside its contract area, ABC wanted a London base, as many performers could not venture outside of the capital to record programmes because they were often committed to runs of theatre plays in the West End. Upon the merger with Rediffusion, this site became the main production base for the new company Thames Television.

In the Midlands, ABC formed a joint venture with Midlands weekday licensee ATV to oversee the running of a production and transmission facility to be used by both. Alpha Television purchased a former cinema in Aston, near Birmingham, and extended it by the construction of additional studios and office space; the site was known as the Alpha Studios.

ABC operated a northern studio centre in Manchester and a sales office based in Television House in the city centre. The production facility was converted from a former Capitol cinema in Didsbury. ABC vacated both premises during 1968. ABC also made some entertainment shows such as Blackpool Night Out and The Blackpool Show at the ABC Theatre in Blackpool (owned by ABC-TV's sister company ABC Cinemas). For its pre-filmed series, such as The Avengers (from 1965), ABC used its parent company's Associated British Elstree Studios, having previously made earlier series at Teddington Studios.

== Identity ==
When ABC first went on the air, it used the branding of its sister company ABC Cinemas. This featured a triangular shield with the letters ABC upon it, and a bar across it with the caption 'Television'. This lasted from the station's launch in 1956 until September 1959. The ITA had criticised ABC's original presentation style for being bland and too much attached to the existing ABC Cinemas chain.

As a result, ABC created a new brand ident featuring three arrows pointing to the bottom of the screen to reveal the letters ABC in turn and leaving a triangle behind and on top of the letters. At the end of this, the three triangles would snap together into the new ABC logo. This ident lasted until 1964 when the lettering font was altered slightly from a serif font to the latest bold used by the company, this revision lasting until the company's demise.

The logo uses the notion of threes, three triangles making another triangle, with the points of a triangle often being labelled 'A', 'B' and 'C' in geometry. The tune that was used for all of ABC's idents was a vibraphone playing the notes A-B-C (la-te-doh). Out of this look, ABC Television developed a strong corporate identity, effectively becoming the first British TV station to recognise the importance of corporate branding.

The company itself was originally called Associated British Cinemas (Television) Limited, which by 1957 had been shortened to A.B.C. Television Limited. However, from about 1967, on exports made by its sister company A.B.C. Television Films Ltd. (such as the last two series of The Avengers), the name 'Associated British Corporation' was used, to avoid confusion with the US ABC network. As for on-air, the name was for a few months 'Associated British', before becoming 'ABC Television', or just 'ABC'. The names 'ABC Television Network' and 'ABC Weekend Network' were also used, for example in TV Times listings. The station received a joke nickname from Bob Monkhouse, namely "All Bloody Commercials".

The station's spoken slogan varied through time, starting off as "ABC – Associated British in the North/Midlands" before being replaced in 1958 to "ABC, your weekend TV" and again changed in 1964 to "ABC, your weekend television in the North/Midlands".

== Continuity announcers ==
The following who have served as announcers for ABC Weekend TV include:

- Jill Bechley,
- John Benson
- Sidonie Bond
- John Braban
- John Duncanson
- John Edmunds
- Philip Elsmore
- David Hamilton
- Sheila Kennedy
- Keith Martin
- John McGavin
- Mel Oxley
- Owen Oyston
- Bill Steel
- Julie Stevens
- Clifford Swindells

== Programming ==
Networked programmes from ABC included the drama series Police Surgeon, The Human Jungle, Undermind, Redcap, The Avengers, the Armchair Theatre series of single plays, the Habatales cartoons, the popular shows Thank Your Lucky Stars, Opportunity Knocks, Big Night Out, Doddy's Music Box and Oh Boy!, Tommy Cooper's shows Cooperama and Life with Cooper, the UK and international artist folk and blues music series Hullabaloo, the children's science fiction serials Emerald Soup, Target Luna and its sequels Pathfinders in Space, Pathfinders to Mars and Pathfinders to Venus, and the gritty drama series Callan and Public Eye (both of which continued as Thames productions after 1968). ITV's first weekly series devoted to the arts, Tempo, was introduced by ABC, as was its first hidden camera show, Candid Camera, and its first attempt to challenge the BBC's dominance of television sport, with World of Sport. ABC also introduced British television's first late night chat show, The Eamonn Andrews Show and, together with ATV, British television's first regular weekly series of adult education programmes.

== Service areas ==
Areas are described in terms of the county boundaries at the time. After ABC's closure there were significant county boundary changes in 1974, and ITV's regional boundaries have also changed over time.

Franchise	Start date	Transmitter	Principal service area	Significant overlap into adjacent regions	Studios
Midlands	18 February 1956	Lichfield; Channel 8	West Midlands and parts of East Midlands	Some areas of Lincolnshire and Northamptonshire (Anglia) Cheshire (ABC North)	Alpha Studios, Birmingham
Midlands	30 April 1965	Membury; Channel 12	Thames Valley	Parts of Hampshire (Southern)	
North	5 May 1956	Winter Hill; Channel 9	Lancashire and Cheshire	North Wales coast (Teledu Cymru) Staffordshire (ABC Midlands)	Didsbury Studios, Manchester
North	3 November 1956	Emley Moor; Channel 10	West Riding of Yorkshire, some areas of Lincolnshire and North and East Ridings	Some areas of Lincolnshire and East Riding (Anglia)	
North	11 June 1965	Scarborough; Channel 6	Scarborough		
	1959				Teddington Studios, London

ABC's two franchise regions each had their own continuity announcers, advertisements and regional programmes (mainly news and weather, and the magazine shows ABC of the Midlands and ABC of the North). Apart from those exceptions, both regions usually showed the same programmes simultaneously.

== See also ==
- Timeline of ABC Weekend TV
- Associated Television – ABC's successor in the Midlands
- Granada Television – ABC's successor in the North West
- Yorkshire Television – ABC's successor in Yorkshire
- ITV (TV network)
- History of ITV

ITV regional services
New service	Midlands (weekends); 18 February 1956 – 28 July 1968	Succeeded by ATV Network; Midlands (7-day)
New service	North of England (weekends); 5 May 1956 – 28 July 1968	Succeeded by Granada Television; North West (7-day)
New service	North of England (weekends); 5 May 1956 – 28 July 1968	Succeeded by Yorkshire Television; Yorkshire (7-day)
