= Roger Tilling =

British voice artist and broadcaster (born 1971)

Roger Tilling (born 17 October 1971, in Hertfordshire, England) is a British voice-over artist, and broadcaster. Since 2001 he has been the announcer for the BBC television quiz programme University Challenge.

== Biography ==
Tilling is a graduate of Queen Mary University of London. He holds a degree in Aeronautical Engineering and is a qualified private pilot.

He began his broadcasting career in local radio. He worked at Chiltern Radio in Hertfordshire, Bedfordshire and Buckinghamshire and Oasis Radio (later Mercury 96.6 and Heart Hertfordshire) in Hertfordshire in 1995. He then moved into television working as a continuity announcer for Westcountry Television (the ITV region in the South West of England) in 1996. In 1997, he joined Granada Television as a continuity and promo voiceover. A year later, he moved to Leeds and worked as a continuity and trailer voice-over for Yorkshire Television, Granada, Tyne Tees and Border Television, as well as being a regular on-air voice of London Weekend Television in London (at the weekends from 1998 to 2002) and then for national ITV after the amalgamation of the ITV regions to London.

Whilst at Granada Television, he was asked to be the temporary announcer of University Challenge for the 1997 series, and then returned permanently in 2001. He has remained the voice of the programme to date. His voice is heard at the start of every show introducing the presenter, Amol Rajan, and whenever a contestant buzzes or rings in for a starter question announcing their college and surname. The voice-overs are performed live in the studio and his voice is famously known for becoming noticeably more energetic towards the end of the programme.

As well as voicing radio and TV commercials for Ford and Travelocity, he emerged on Granada Sky Broadcasting in 1999, before becoming the voice of the Hallmark Channel (now Universal Channel) since 2001 in 40 countries worldwide and Movies 24 since 2006.

Tilling has also been the voice of other game shows on various channels, including the 70-episode series of Family Fortunes aired from 2 September to 6 December 2002. BBC's Panorama producers have regularly brought him in for vocal contributions for their current affairs programmes since 2003.

In 2005 Channel 5 chose Tilling to voice the Man Eaters series of wildlife documentaries, and Naked Science series of science documentaries. He has been the voice of I Can't Believe It's Not Butter!, Formula One and Deep Heat television commercials in the UK. His voice can also be heard narrating documentaries for National Geographic Channel which are broadcast worldwide. In 2009 Tilling re-voiced Man Eaters for ITV Global for worldwide distribution.

In April 2010 Tilling was chosen as the voice of Shreddies television commercials starring Leslie Phillips, promoting the advertising campaign for "More Knitting Nanas Needed". Sky Sports chose him for its Soccer AM sponsorship campaign with Head & Shoulders.

In November 2012 Tilling was asked to be the announcer at the 100th Royal Variety Performance, introducing Her Majesty Queen Elizabeth II and Prince Philip, Duke of Edinburgh to the Royal Albert Hall. He has also been the voice of The British Soap Awards and many other major television ceremonies.

Denso has used Tilling as the English voice of its in-car satellite navigation systems for factory-fitted models in Land Rover, Range Rover, Jaguar and Toyota cars since 2005. He has over 20 years of live radio and TV experience. In 2010 British Airways selected Tilling as the voice of its worldwide inflight entertainment.

== Personal life ==
Tilling is based in London.

Preceded by Jim Pope; 1972–2001	University Challenge announcer 2001–present	Succeeded by Current announcer
