= The Adventures of Portland Bill =

British stop-motion animated TV series (1983–1986)

- Title card
- Created by: John Grace
- Starring: Norman Rossington
- Country of origin: United Kingdom
- Original language: English
- No. of series: 2
- No. of episodes: 25 (2 stories per episode)

Production
- Running time: 5 mins
- Production company: FilmFair London

Original release
- Network: ITV (CITV)
- Release: 4 October 1983 – 25 June 1986

The Adventures of Portland Bill is a British stop motion animated children's television series made in 1983. It is set in a fictional lighthouse on the Guillemot Rock, just off the coast from the fictional village of McGuillycuddy. Norman Rossington provides the voice of all the characters, with Portland Bill the principal keeper acting as the narrator of each episode.

== Characters ==
Most of its characters were named after British Sea Areas and coastal weather stations and other words that occur in shipping forecasts:

These live in the lighthouse:

- Portland Bill: Principal lighthouse keeper
- Ross and Cromarty (see also Ross and Cromarty): his assistants
- Dogger: his dog

The rest of the characters live elsewhere:

- Fastnet: fisherman, lives on the island
- Mrs. Lundy: owns a cottage on the mainland
- Grandma Tiree: makes oatcakes for the lighthousemen
- Inspector Ronaldsway: belongs to the lighthouse service
- Finisterre: owns a croft
- Eddy Stone: owns the village shop; also is the village's milkman, mayor, postman, electrician, meter-reader and policeman.
- Young Gail: lives in McGuillycuddy
- Miss Shannon: artist, lives in McGuillycuddy

=== Places ===
- McGuillycuddy: a village on the mainland overlooking the lighthouse island: named after the real MacGillycuddy's Reeks in Ireland

=== Location ===
The idea was originated by John Grace and submitted to the competition 'Maritime England'. Most of the characters are named after the areas of the UK Shipping Forecast. Grandma Tiree and Inspector Ronaldsway are named after automatic weather stations and “Gail” is named after the high winds frequently forecast. Portland Bill is likely based on the Dorset lighthouse of the same name. The submission won the prize and was picked up by Graham Clutterbuck at FilmFair who went on to commission two series for ITV. At the time, John Grace and Mik Parsons were colleagues teaching in the Graphic Design Department at Leicester Polytechnic (now DeMontfort University). They collaborated on the music and song content with Mik Parsons recording all the songs on his 4-track cassette based Tascam Portastudio.

=== Boats ===
- The Puffin: rowboat, belongs to Portland Bill.
- The Kipper: used by Eddy Stone and Inspector Ronaldsway.

=== Animals ===
- Flotsam, Jetsam: two sheep
- Boulmer: bull

== Credits ==
Series 1

- Originated by: John Grace
- Director of Animation: Barry Leith
- Designed by: John Grace, Barry Leith
- Assistant Animators: Humphrey Leadbitter, Heather Boucher
- Model Makers: Martin Cheek, Gordon Tait, Linda Thodesen
- Music by: John Grace, Mik Parsons
- Editor: Robert Dunbar
- Assistant Editor: Andi Sloss
- Production Coordinator: Barrie Edwards
- Stories Adapted for TV by: Ian Sachs
- Executive Producer: Graham Clutterbuck

John Grace/FilmFair Ltd MCMLXXXIII

Series 2

- Originated by: John Grace
- Director of Animation: Humphrey Leadbitter
- Designed by: John Grace, Barry Leith
- Assistant Animator: Martin Cheek
- Model Makers: Martin Cheek, Jo Pierpoint White, Gordon Tait
- Music by: John Grace, Mik Parsons
- Lighting by: Ted Martin
- Edited by: Andrew Sloss
- Assisted by: Richard Ireland
- Producer: Barrie Edwards
- Production Assistant: Mark Woodroffe
- Executive Producer: Graham Clutterbuck

John Grace/FilmFair Ltd MCMLXXXVI

== Transmission guide ==
=== Series 1 ===
13 editions from 4 October 1983 – 3 January 1984 (aired on Tuesdays)

- Changeable Weather (4 October 1983) – When Ross and Cromarty's efforts to paint the lighthouse end in slapstick fun, they conjure up rain and snow effects to keep Portland Bill inside.
- The Tourists (4 October 1983) – Portland Bill visits McGuillycuddy, while there he helps his friend Eddy Stone and makes the tourists' day trip a memorable one.
- The Fishing Match (11 October 1983) – When Ross and Cromarty stage a fishing match they catch more than they bargained for.
- The Seaweed Clock (11 October 1983) – How does Portland Bill manage to tell the time by his seaweed clock?
- Portland Bill's Busy Day (18 October 1983) – Portland Bill has a day off on the mainland and manages to help all his friends with their jobs.
- The Sea Monster (18 October 1983) – Laughter on the night watch when Ross and Cromarty find a sea monster in the living room.
- Bedtime For Cromarty (25 October 1983) – Portland Bill recommends an effective but most unusual remedy for Cromarty's hiccups.
- The Birthday Surprise (25 October 1983) – Eddy Stone's delivery day has a surprise in store for him at the lighthouse on the Guillemot Rock.
- The Jam Session (1 November 1983) – Cromarty and Finisterre's unexpected jam session in the lighthouse turns into musical mayhem when Portland Bill joins in on the bagpipes.
- An Inspector Calls (1 November 1983) – The assistant keepers do everything wrong when the lighthouse inspector calls but Portland Bill is pleased with his final report.
- Important Message (8 November 1983) – A misunderstood semaphore message results in a slap-up tea for the lighthouse keepers.
- Buried Treasure (8 November 1983) – Cromarty finds more than he bargained for when he embarks on a treasure hunt in the village of McGuillycuddy.
- Atmospheric Interference (15 November 1983) – Cromarty's weather forecasting kit comes in handy on the day of the cup final.
- Dogger's Best Trick (15 November 1983) – When the water pipe in McGuillycuddy is threatening to burst, Dogger the dog manages to save the day but he takes the sausages when he tries to get Eddy Stone's attention.
- A Knot For Everything (22 November 1983) – Portland Bill's ability to tie all sorts of knots is tested on his visit to McGuillycuddy.
- The Wind Powered Vacuum Cleaner (22 November 1983) – Cromarty invents a wind powered vacuum cleaner to speed up spring cleaning in the lighthouse. All is fine until the wind changes direction.
- The Good News Storm (29 November 1983) – Ross and Cromarty find out that even the fiercest storm can be good news on the Guillemot Rock.
- The Whistling Kettle (29 November 1983) – A whistling kettle helps Eddy Stone to pacify a runaway bull.
- Baking Day (6 December 1983) – Cromarty's expertise as a chef comes into question on the day that Eddy Stone's boat loses its anchor.
- Bird Watching (6 December 1983) – A penguin's visit to the lighthouse has chaotic results, but Ross and Cromarty are too busy bird-watching to notice.
- The Lost Key (13 December 1983) – The keepers search high and low for a special lighthouse key. Valencia the parrot and Dogger the dog know where it is all the time.
- Sick As A Parrot (13 December 1983) – It's riotous laughter for all when Cromarty and Valencia the parrot find that they have something in common.
- Portland Bill And The Mermaid (20 December 1983) – Ross and Cromarty refuse to believe in mermaids until they meet one face to face.
- The Big Shopping List (20 December 1983) – The order from the oil rig is the biggest that Eddy Stone has ever had but he is able to fill it with some help from Portland Bill.
- The Day The Sea Froze (3 January 1984) – The lighthouse keepers use spectacular methods to keep warm on the day that the sea freezes around the Guillemot Rock.
- The Fishermen's Ball (3 January 1984) – Poster pasting ends in fun and laughter at the fishermen's ball.

=== Series 2 ===
12 editions from 9 April 1986 – 25 June 1986 (aired on Wednesdays)

- The Guided Tour (9 April 1986) – Ross and Cromarty await the Lighthouse Inspector only to find they're besieged by tourists.
- Beach Combers (9 April 1986) – Miss Shannon so longs to own her own pottery, what can Portland Bill do to help?
- The Foggy Day (16 April 1986) – Bill jokes that the incoming fog will bring King Neptune to the lighthouse.
- Kite Flying (16 April 1986) – It's a windy day in the village of McGuillycuddy, ideal kite flying weather.
- Football Pie (23 April 1986) – After mistaking a pumpkin for a football, Ross and Cromarty have a surprise treat for tea.
- Gone Fishing (23 April 1986) – Ross and Cromarty have a fishing match but what they catch certainly isn't edible.
- Bad Dogger (30 April 1986) – Dogger is acting very strangely, barking at everybody, what can be wrong?
- The Garden Party (30 April 1986) – Bill invites all his friends to a Garden Party at the lighthouse, but he doesn't have a garden.
- A Quiet Night (7 May 1986) – Being on nightwatch at the Lighthouse can be a bit boring, except when something goes wrong.
- The Phantom Piper (7 May 1986) – Strange music is heard in the village, could the Legend Of The Phantom Piper be true.
- Forty Winks (14 May 1986) – Eddy Stone is so tired he falls asleep, but he's at sea and there's a storm blowing.
- Last Jam Tart (14 May 1986) – Whoever finishes their work first gets the last Jam Tart, but who will it be?
- Penguins (21 May 1986) – Bill's orders to Ross are, Don't feed the penguins, but surely one little biscuit can't hurt.
- Super Sale (21 May 1986) – Eddy Stone decides to have a Super Sale at his shop.
- Painting The Lighthouse (28 May 1986) – Cromarty tries his hand at being an artist.
- Hot Gossip (28 May 1986) – A Royal welcome is in store for Valencia the parrot, when she's mistaken for a Princess.
- Good Ideas (4 June 1986) – Cromarty has a list of chores to do before Bill and Ross get back from the mainland.
- Sky High (4 June 1986) – Ross and Cromarty take a ride of a lifetime when they open a package they shouldn't.
- Weather Forecast (11 June 1986) – Whatever day Cromarty chooses to do the washing it always seems to rain.
- Dogger To The Rescue (11 June 1986) – Dogger hates having a bath, but loves a swim in the sea, which is just as well for Bill.
- St. Bozo's Treasure (18 June 1986) – Ross and Cromarty go in search of St. Bozo's Treasure, but treasure isn't exactly what they find.
- The Runaway Sheep (18 June 1986) – Chaos is caused the day Finisterre's sheep escape in the village.
- The Sea Chest (25 June 1986) – When Ross and Cromarty have a fishing match, Cromarty decides to cheat.
- The Big Catch (25 June 1986) – Fastnet bets he can catch more in his fishing nets than Bill, but can he?

== Trivia ==
- The series was narrated by actor of Spooner's Patch and Big Jim and the Figaro Club, Norman Rossington.
- The show aired on ABC in Australia (10 August 1987 – 28 February 1992). However, whereas two episodes were shown back-to-back in the UK, each episode was screened individually in Australia. The show was also screened in New Zealand on TV One starting in the same year. In Canada the series aired on Knowledge Network during the late 1980s.
- Series 1 of the show aired in Greece on the Channel 2 of Hellenic National Television (known as ERT2) in 1984. It was dubbed in Greek. In Iran the series was aired on IRIB dubbed in Persian.
- Each broadcast and the series 1 episodes that were featured on the VHS releases consisted of two episodes back-to-back connected by a song. Unfortunately, the songs are not featured on the DVD releases, but one song, 'Eddy's Song' has been uploaded to YouTube. In 2021, one of the show's musicians Mik Parsons uploaded four of the songs to YouTube.

== VHS releases ==
FilmFair Fun had released one single video containing five double-length stories from the first series on it:

Title	Catalogue number	Release date	Episodes
The Adventures of Portland Bill	40100	1986	"Changeable Weather"; "The Tourists"; "The Fishing Match"; "The Seaweed Clock"; "Portland Bill's Busy Day"; "The Sea Monster"; "Bedtime for Cromarty"; "The Birthday Surprise"; "The Jam Session"; "An Inspector Calls"

Sometime during 1988, FilmFair Fun had also released an extended single video with six double-length stories from the first series on it:

Title	Catalogue number	Release date	Episodes
The Adventures of Portland Bill I	FF1111	1988	"Changeable Weather"; "The Tourists"; "The Fishing Match"; "The Seaweed Clock"; "Portland Bill's Busy Day"; "The Sea Monster"; "Bedtime for Cromarty"; "The Birthday Surprise"; "The Jam Session"; "An Inspector Calls"; "An Important Message"; "The Treasure Hunt"

Snapdragon Video released a collection of 10 Portland Bill stories from the second series:

Title	Catalogue number	Release date	Episodes
Portland Bill: 10 Stories from the Classic TV Series	SD 9001	7 October 1991	"Dogger to the Rescue"; "Gone Fishing"; "Kite Flying"; "Forty Winks"; "Bad Dogger"; "Last Jam Tart; "Sky High"; "St. Bozo's Treasure"; "Penguins"; "The Phantom Piper"

On 17 July 1995, Castle Communications Plc released three videos with four double-length episodes each:

VHS Name	Castle Vision Catalogue Number	Playbox Catalogue Number	Episodes
Portland Bill: 45 Minutes of Fun	CVS 4040	PVC 145	"The Jam Session"; "An Inspector Calls"; "An Important Message"; "The Treasure Hunt"; "Atmospheric Interference"; "Dogger's Best Trick"; "A Knot for Everything"; "The Wind-Powered Vacuum Cleaner"
Portland Bill: Four Original Episodes	CVS 4041	PVC 146	"Changeable Weather"; "The Tourists"; "The Fishing Match"; "The Seaweed Clock"; "Portland Bill's Busy Day"; "The Sea Monster"; "Bedtime for Cromarty"; "The Birthday Surprise"
Portland Bill: Four Classic Adventures	CVS 4042	PVC 147	"The Good News Storm"; "A Whistling Kettle"; "Baking Day"; "Bird Watching"; "The Lost Key"; "Sick as a Parrot"; "Portland Bill and the Mermaid"; "The Big Shopping List"

== DVD releases ==
Abbey Home Media released two DVDs containing twenty four episodes from the first season. The episodes are presented in single bill format and do not include the songs that were originally featured between two episodes each.

Title	Release date	Episodes
The Adventures Of Portland Bill: Changeable Weather (AHEDVD 3160)	12 June 2006	"Changeable Weather"; "The Tourists"; "The Fishing Match"; "The Seaweed Clock"; "Portland Bill's Busy Day"; "The Sea Monster"; "Bedtime for Cromarty"; "The Birthday Surprise"; "The Jam Session"; "An Inspector Calls"; "Important Message"; "Buried Treasure"
The Adventures Of Portland Bill: Atmospheric Interference (AHEDVD 3219)	26 March 2007	"Atmospheric Interference"; "Dogger's Best Trick"; "A Knot for Everything"; "The Wind Powered Vacuum Cleaner"; "The Good News Storm"; "The Whistling Kettle"; "Baking Day"; "Bird Watching"; "The Lost Key"; "Sick As A Parrot"; "Portland Bill and the Mermaid"; "The Big Shopping List"
