= Shipping Forecast =

British maritime weather report and forecast

- Genre: Maritime weather forecast
- Country of origin: United Kingdom
- Language: English
- Home station: BBC Radio 4
- Created by: Robert FitzRoy
- Original release: 24 August 1867 (telegraph); 1 January 1924 (radio, Morse Code); 4 July 1925 (radio, spoken word)

The Shipping Forecast is a BBC Radio broadcast of weather reports and forecasts for the seas around the British Isles. It is produced by the Met Office and broadcast by BBC Radio 4 on behalf of the Maritime and Coastguard Agency. The forecast dates back over 150 years. There are currently two or three broadcasts per day, at 00:48, 05:34, and 17:54 (weekends only) UK local time. It was first broadcast on BBC Radio on 4 July 1925.

In the forecast, the waters around the British Isles are divided into 31 sea areas, also known as weather areas. The forecast begins by listing areas with gale warnings, followed by a general synopsis of pressure areas, then a forecast for each individual sea area covering wind speed and direction, precipitation, and visibility. Extended forecasts at 00:48 and 05:34 include information from coastal weather stations and an inshore waters forecast.

The unique and distinctive presentation style of these broadcasts has led to their attracting an audience much wider than that directly interested in maritime weather conditions. It is frequently referred to and parodied in British popular culture.

== History ==
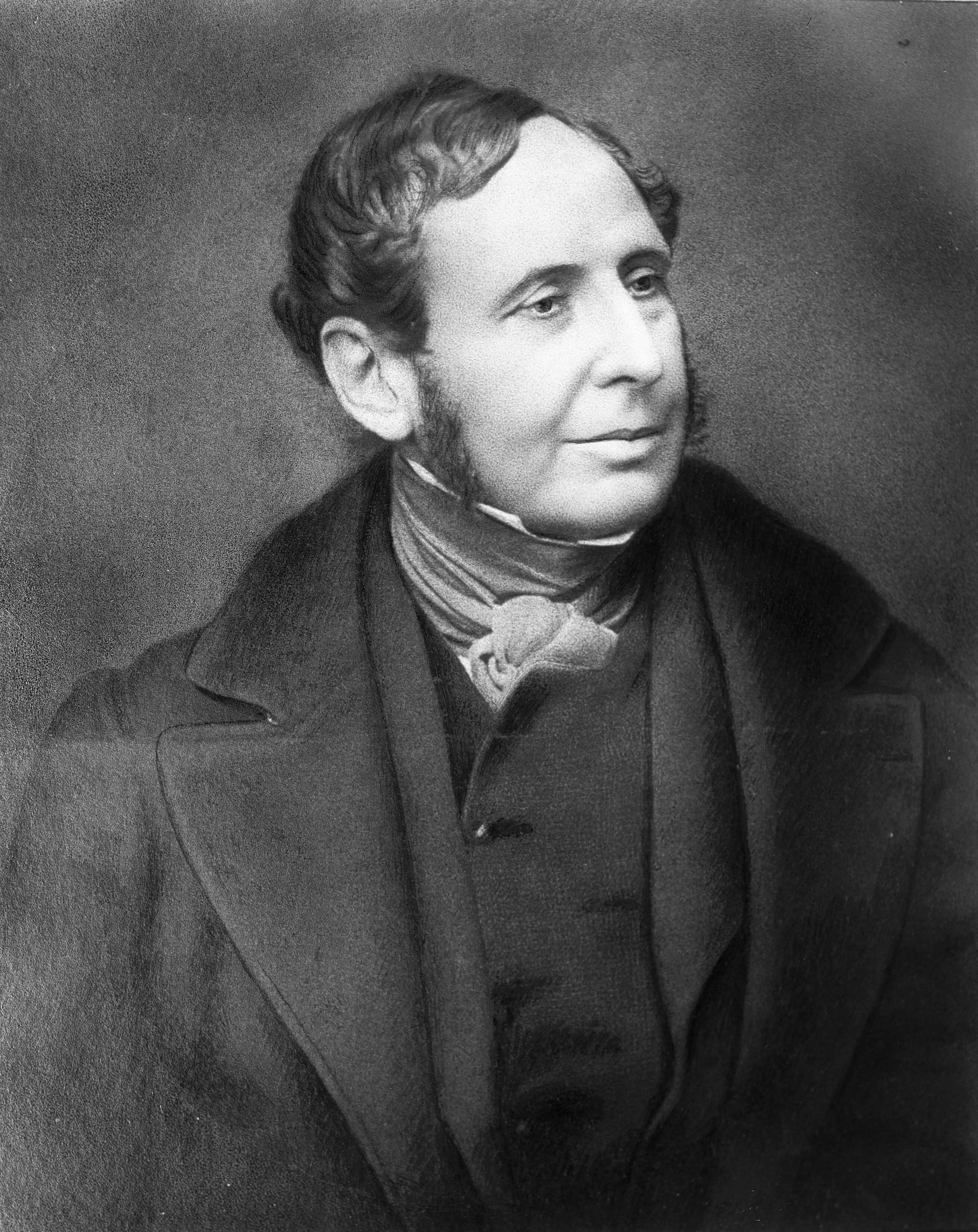
Robert FitzRoy circa 1850

The Shipping Forecast was established by Vice-Admiral Robert FitzRoy, the first professional weather forecaster, captain of HMS Beagle and founder of the Met Office. In October 1859, the steam clipper Royal Charter was wrecked in a strong storm off Anglesey; 450 people lost their lives. In response to this loss, FitzRoy introduced a warning service for shipping in February 1861, using telegraph communications. This remained the United Kingdom's Met Office primary responsibility for some time afterward. In 1911, the Met Office began issuing marine weather forecasts which included gale and storm warnings via radio transmission for areas around the British Isles. This service was discontinued during and following the First World War, between 1914 and June 1921, and again during the Second World War between 1939 and 1945.

The programme, then called Weather Shipping, first took the form of a radio broadcast on 1 January 1924 in Morse Code over the Air Ministry's radio station. From 4 July 1925, it has been transmitted as a spoken word broadcast by the BBC.

Today, although most ships have onboard technology to provide the Forecast's information, they still use it to check their data.

On Friday 30 May 2014, for the first time in more than 90 years, BBC Radio 4 failed to broadcast the Shipping Forecast at 0520. Staff at Broadcasting House were reading out the report but it was not transmitted. Listeners instead heard BBC World Service.

The 150th anniversary of the shipping forecast was on 24 August 2017, while the 100th anniversary of the BBC's version was on 4 July 2025.

Between 30 March 2020 and 5 July 2020, as a result of emergency rescheduling because of the COVID-19 pandemic, the number of bulletins a day was reduced to three, at 00:48, 05:33, and either 12:03 (weekdays) or 17:54 (weekends).

== Broadcast times and frequencies ==
From 1 April 2024, there is no longer a separate long wave schedule for Radio 4, so the number of broadcasts per day has been reduced to two on weekdays and three at weekends, at the following (UK local) times. They can be received on FM, DAB, Sky, Freeview, Freesat, Virgin Media and online via BBC Sounds.

- 00:48. Includes weather reports from an extended list of coastal stations at 00:52 and an inshore waters forecast at 00:55 and concludes with a brief UK weather outlook for the coming day. The broadcast finishes at approximately 00:58.
- 05:34 (from 24 March 2025 - previously at 05:20). Includes weather reports from coastal stations at 05:38, and an inshore waters forecast at 05:40.
- 17:54 (Saturdays and Sundays only).

The forecasts are read by the duty announcer. Until 23 March 2025, the 05:20 forecast was read by the weather forecaster.

Until 31 March 2024, there were four broadcasts per day at the following (UK local) times:

- 00:48 – transmitted on FM and LW.
- 05:20 – transmitted on FM and LW.
- 12:01 – normally transmitted on LW only.
- 17:54 – transmitted only on LW on weekdays, as an opt-out from the PM programme, but at weekends transmitted on both FM and LW.

=== Longwave ===
The Shipping Forecast has been broadcast on BBC longwave radio services so the signal can be received clearly at sea all around the British Isles, regardless of time of day or radio conditions. The forecast was broadcast on the BBC National Programme until September 1939, and then after the Second World War on the BBC Light Programme (later BBC Radio 2) until November 1978. When BBC Radio 4 took over the longwave frequency from Radio 2 on 23 November 1978, the Shipping Forecast moved to Radio 4 to keep it broadcasting on longwave.

As part of the BBC's plans to switch off BBC Radio 4 longwave transmissions, it reduced daily broadcasts of the Shipping Forecast to the FM simulcast schedule of twice on weekdays and three times on weekends in April 2024.

The BBC stopped broadcasting on long wave on 27 June 2026.

=== Online ===
The Shipping Forecast is published online by the Met Office and the BBC. It is also available on BBC Sounds.

=== Television broadcasts ===
On 18 December 1993, as part of the Arena Radio Night, BBC Radio 4 and BBC 2 collaborated on a one off simulcast so the shipping forecast – read that night by Laurie Macmillan – could be seen as well as heard. To date, it is the only time that it has been broadcast on television.

== Region names ==
Map of Sea Areas and Coastal Weather Stations referred to in the Shipping Forecast

The 31 sea areas covered in the forecast are as shown in this table and map. The forecast follows the order shown, going clockwise around the British Isles, with each area except Trafalgar, Irish Sea, Shannon, and Fair Isle bordering the previous. Trafalgar is included only in the 00:48 forecast, except when gales or more are due there.

Order	Name	Origin of Name
1	Viking	Viking Bank
2	North Utsire	Utsira (island)
3	South Utsire	Utsira (island)
4	Forties	Long Forties
5	Cromarty	Cromarty Firth
6	Forth	Firth of Forth
7	Tyne	Tyne Estuary
8	Dogger	Dogger Bank
9	Fisher	Fisher Bank
10	German Bight	German Bight
11	Humber	Humber (estuary)
12	Thames	Thames Estuary
13	Dover	Dover (port)
14	Wight	Isle of Wight
15	Portland	Isle of Portland
16	Plymouth	Plymouth (port)
17	Biscay	Bay of Biscay
18	Trafalgar	Cape Trafalgar
19	FitzRoy	After Robert FitzRoy
20	Sole	Sole Bank
21	Lundy	Lundy (island)
22	Fastnet	Fastnet Rock
23	Irish Sea	Irish Sea
24	Shannon	Shannon Estuary
25	Rockall	Rockall (islet) / Rockall Basin
26	Malin	Malin Head
27	Hebrides	Hebrides (archipelago)
28	Bailey	Bill Bailey's Bank
29	Fair Isle	Fair Isle
30	Faeroes	Faroe Islands
31	Southeast Iceland	Iceland

These areas still largely follow the format of the chart adopted in 1949. In 1955, meteorologists from countries bordering the North Sea met and recommended the following changes: that the area Heligoland be renamed German Bight, to conform with the name generally used by other countries; that a new area, Fisher, be split off from the north-eastern half of Dogger; that a new area, Viking, be split off from the northern half of Forties; and that the area Iceland be renamed Southeast Iceland to clarify its position. After international consultation, these were adopted in 1956. In August 1984, to conform with common North Sea area boundaries agreed upon by neighbouring countries, the areas North Utsire and South Utsire were created. In 2002, the area Finisterre was renamed FitzRoy, to avoid confusion with a different area called Finisterre used by the Spanish meteorological service.

The sea areas match the forecast areas used by other North Sea countries, though some names differ. The Dutch KNMI and Norwegian counterpart names Forties the Fladen Ground, while Météo-France uses Pas-de-Calais for Dover, Antifer for Wight, Casquets for Portland and Ouessant for Plymouth.

=== Coastal weather stations ===
The coastal weather stations named in the Shipping Forecast (and labelled on the map) are:

- Tiree Automatic (1)
- Stornoway (2)
- Lerwick (3)
- Wick Automatic (a) (0048 only)
- Aberdeen (b) (0048 only)
- Leuchars (4)
- Boulmer (c) (0048 only)
- Bridlington (5)
- Sandettie Light Vessel Automatic (6)
- Greenwich Light Vessel Automatic (7)
- St. Catherine's Point Automatic (d) (0048 only)
- Jersey (8)
- Channel Light Vessel Automatic (9)
- Scilly Automatic (10)
- Milford Haven (e) (0048 only)
- Aberporth (f) (0048 only)
- Valley (g) (0048 only)
- Liverpool Crosby (h) (0048 only)
- Valentia (11)
- Ronaldsway (12)
- Malin Head (13)
- Machrihanish Automatic (i) (0048 only)

=== Inshore waters ===
The inshore waters forecast uses the following coastal areas of the United Kingdom:

1. Cape Wrath – Rattray Head including Orkney
2. Rattray Head – Berwick-upon-Tweed
3. Berwick-upon-Tweed – Whitby
4. Whitby – Gibraltar Point
5. Gibraltar Point – North Foreland
6. North Foreland – Selsey Bill
7. Selsey Bill – Lyme Regis
8. Lyme Regis – Land's End including the Isles of Scilly
9. Land's End – St David's Head including the Bristol Channel
10. St David's Head – Great Orme Head including St George's Channel
11. Great Orme Head – Mull of Galloway
12. Isle of Man
13. Lough Foyle – Carlingford Lough (covers the entire coastline of Northern Ireland)
14. Mull of Galloway – Mull of Kintyre including the Firth of Clyde and the North Channel
15. Mull of Kintyre – Ardnamurchan Point
16. Ardnamurchan Point – Cape Wrath
17. Shetland Isles

== Broadcast format ==
Shipping Forecast
An extract of the area forecasts

The Shipping Forecast follows a very strict format. Excluding the header line, it has a limit of 350 words—except for the 0048 broadcast, where it is increased to 380 to accommodate Trafalgar's inclusion.

Forecast times are spelled out as digits on the 24-hour clock, for example "two-three-double-O", and barometric pressures are pronounced as whole numbers, for example "a thousand and five". With regard to the timing of weather events, the words "Imminent", "Soon" and "Later" are used and are tightly defined. "Imminent" means within 6 hours, "Soon" means within 6 to 12 hours and "Later" means within 12 to 24 hours.

The basic order of the forecast is:

1. Gale warnings in force (if any)
2. General synopsis
3. Area forecasts: wind direction/speed, weather, visibility, ship icing if any
4. Coastal weather stations (00:48 and 05:20 only): wind direction/speed, precipitation if any, visibility, pressure
5. Inshore waters (00:48 and 05:20 only): wind direction/speed, weather, visibility

=== Introduction, gale warnings, and general synopsis ===
The forecast begins with "And now the Shipping Forecast, issued by the Met Office on behalf of the Maritime and Coastguard Agency at xxxx today." This format is followed quite strictly, although some continuity announcers read out the actual date of issue as opposed to the word "today".

This is followed by gale warnings (winds of force 8 or more on the Beaufort scale), if any (e.g., "There are warnings of gales in Rockall, Malin, Hebrides, Bailey, and Fair Isle"). This sometimes follows the opposite format (e.g., "There are warnings of gales in all areas except Biscay, Trafalgar and FitzRoy").

The general synopsis follows, giving the position, pressure (in millibars) and track of pressure areas (e.g., "Low, Rockall, 987, deepening rapidly, expected Fair Isle 964 by 0700 tomorrow"). With the information provided in the Shipping Forecast it is possible to compile a pressure chart for the coasts of northwestern Europe.

=== Area forecasts ===
Each area's 24-hour forecast is then read out. Several areas may be combined into a single forecast where the conditions are expected to be similar. Wind direction is given first, then strength (on the Beaufort scale), followed by precipitation, if any, and (usually) lastly visibility.

Change in wind direction is indicated by "veering" (clockwise change) or "backing" (anti-clockwise change). Winds at or above force 8 are also described by name for emphasis, i.e., Gale 8, Severe Gale 9, Storm 10, Violent Storm 11 and Hurricane force 12. The word "force" is only officially used when announcing force 12 winds.

Visibility is given in the format "Good", meaning that the visibility is greater than 5 nautical miles (9.3 km; 5.8 mi); "Moderate", where visibility is between 2 and 5 nautical miles (3.7 and 9.3 km; 2.3 and 5.8 mi); "Poor", where visibility is between 1,000 metres and two nautical miles and "Fog", where visibility is less than 1,000 m (3,300 ft). When severe winter cold combines with strong winds and a cold sea, icing can occur and, if expected, icing warnings (light, moderate or severe) are given as the last item of each sea area forecast.

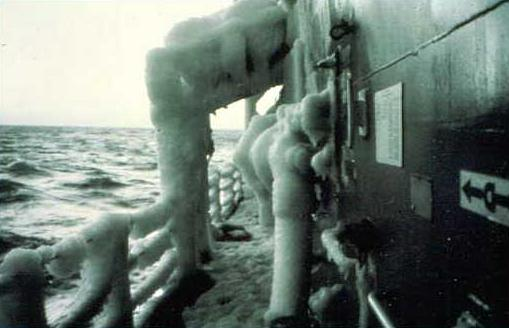
Icing can be a dangerous problem for ships; accurate forecasting can save lives by ensuring crews are prepared

Examples of area forecasts:

- "Humber, Thames. Southeast veering southwest 4 or 5, occasionally 6 later. Thundery showers. Moderate or good, occasionally poor."
- "Tyne, Dogger. Northeast 3 or 4. Occasional rain. Moderate or poor."
- "Rockall, Malin, Hebrides. Southwest gale 8 to storm 10, veering west, severe gale 9 to violent storm 11. Rain, then squally showers. Poor, becoming moderate."
- "Southeast Iceland. Northerly 7 to severe gale 9. Heavy snow showers. Good, becoming poor in showers. Moderate icing."

On 10 January 1993, during the Braer Storm, a record North Atlantic low pressure of 914 mb was recorded. The shipping forecast was:

- "Rockall, Malin, Hebrides, Bailey. Southwest hurricane force 12 or more."

=== Coastal weather stations and inshore waters ===
Extended shipping forecasts (00:48 and 05:34) also include weather reports from coastal weather stations followed by a forecast for the inshore waters of the United Kingdom. This additional information does not fall within the 350/380-word restriction.

The reports for coastal weather stations use the following format: name of the station, wind direction/speed, precipitation (if any), visibility in miles, barometric pressure, and trend in pressure. For example, "Machrihanish Automatic. West by south 6, rain, 1 mile, 981, falling more slowly."

The inshore waters forecast begins with a summary of the general situation, followed by forecasts for coastal sections, moving clockwise, using a format similar to that used for sea areas.

== "Sailing By" ==
The 00:48 Shipping Forecast, at the end of the broadcast day, is traditionally preceded by the playing of "Sailing By", a light orchestral piece by Ronald Binge. This is only very rarely omitted, generally when the schedule is running late. Though occasionally played in full, it is common for only a section of the piece to be broadcast; that section being the length required to fill the gap between the previous programme's ending and the start of the forecast at precisely 00:48. "Sailing By" serves as an identification tool – it is distinctive and as such assists anyone attempting to tune in. The forecast is then followed by a more general weather report, the sign-off, traditionally ending with the presenter wishing the audience a good night, the national anthem "God Save the King" and the closedown of the station for the day, with the BBC World Service taking over the frequencies after the pips of the Greenwich Time Signal at 01:00.

== Related forecasts ==
Similar broadcasts are given by HM Coastguard to vessels at sea tuned into marine VHF and MF radio frequencies. HM Coastguard's broadcasts can only be heard by vessels or persons using or tuned into marine VHF and MF radio frequencies, whereas the Shipping Forecast can be heard by anyone tuned into BBC Radio 4. The Coastguard's broadcasts follow the same format as the shipping forecast using the same terminology and style, but the information only normally applies to the area sector or region covered by that particular Coastguard Co-ordination Centre (such as the Bristol Channel, for instance).

Announcements of pending broadcasts by HM Coastguard are given on marine channel 16 VHF and are announced with (e.g.), "Sécurité. All stations. This is Milford Haven Coastguard... For the Maritime Safety Information, listen on VHF Channel 62. This is Milford Haven Coastguard."

A similar broadcast on MF is initially announced on 2182 kHz, with a further frequency specified, e.g., 1770 kHz. VHF optimum range is approximately 30 nautical miles (56 km; 35 mi), effectively line of sight, whereas MF range is much greater at approximately 150 nmi (280 km; 170 mi), allowing ships in the Atlantic Ocean and North Sea to receive the broadcast.

The forecasts sent over the Navtex system use a similar format and the same sea areas.

RTÉ Radio 1 broadcasts coastal reports for Ireland similar to those in the Shipping Forecast for the UK. In Sweden, Sveriges Radio P1 broadcasts maritime weather broadcasts (Land- och sjöväderrapporten) similar to the Shipping Forecast during its weather forecasts which it receives from the SMHI. In the areas covered by the British Shipping Forecast, the Swedish forecast uses the same names but translated into Swedish; for example, German Bight is known as Tyska bukten.

== Influences on popular culture ==
The Shipping Forecast is immensely popular with the British public; it attracts listeners in the hundreds of thousands daily – far more than actually require it. In 1995, a plan to move the late night broadcast by 12 minutes triggered angry newspaper editorials and debates in the UK Parliament and was ultimately scrapped. Similar outcry greeted the Met Office's decision to rename Finisterre to FitzRoy, but in that case, the decision was carried through. Peter Jefferson, who read the Forecast for 40 years until 2009, says that he received letters from listeners across the UK saying that the 0048 broadcast helped them get to sleep after a long day. The Controller of BBC Radio 4, Mark Damazer, attempted to explain its popularity:

It scans poetically. It's got a rhythm of its own. It's eccentric, it's unique, it's English. It's slightly mysterious because nobody really knows where these places are. It takes you into a faraway place that you can't really comprehend unless you're one of these people bobbing up and down in the Channel.

Zeb Soanes, a regular Shipping Forecast reader, described it thus:

To the non-nautical, it is a nightly litany of the sea. It reinforces a sense of being islanders with a proud seafaring past. Whilst the listener is safely tucked-up in their bed, they can imagine small fishing-boats bobbing about at Plymouth or 170ft waves crashing against Rockall.

Soanes also wrote the foreword to The Shipping Forecast Puzzle Book (BBC Books, 2020), in which he explains:

The forecast gives the wind direction and force, atmospheric pressure, visibility and the state of the sea. It is a nightly litany with a rhythm and indefinable poetry that have made it popular with millions of people who never have cause to put to sea and have little idea what it actually means; a reminder that whilst you're tucked-up safely under the bedclothes, far out over the waves it's a wilder and more dangerous picture, one that captures the imagination and leads it into uncharted waters whilst you sleep. Dependable, reassuring and never hurried, in these especially uncertain times The Shipping Forecast is a still small voice of calm across the airwaves.

Pick of the Week presenter and Forecast reader Andrew Peach described it as "a late night lullaby: part meteorology, part poetry" and another regular reader of the Forecast, Kathy Clugston, said it was "Like a lullaby, almost". Jo Ellison of Financial Times wrote that "Over time it has become a beloved cultural icon, a tacit expression of our national identity."

The Twentieth Century Society Director Catherine Croft commented:

Initially a utilitarian service for a specific minority, it's been adopted as a much loved emotional comfort blanket by a broader demographic – who never go to sea. It's a poetic reverie and symbol of national caring, whilst at the same time a reminder of our geographical isolation and the uncontrollable power of natural phenomena.

BBC Sounds took inspiration by the comments from people using the forecast to fall asleep and created a podcast called The Sleeping Forecast, where samples of the forecast are paired with classical and ambient music.

=== Music ===
The Shipping Forecast has inspired a number of songs and poems, including the following:

- "Shipping Song" on Lisa Knapp's 2013 album Hidden Seam
- "Mercy" on Wire's 1978 album Chairs Missing includes the lyrics:
  Snow storms forecast imminently in areas
  Dogger, Viking, Moray, Forth, and Orkney
- "This Is a Low" on Blur's album Parklife includes the lyrics:
  Up the Tyne, Forth and Cromarty
  There's a low in the high Forties
  The song also contains references to Biscay, Dogger, Thames ("Hit traffic on the Dogger bank / Up the Thames to find a taxi rank") and Malin Head, one of the coastal stations.
  Blur's early tour film, Starshaped, also uses extracts from the Shipping Forecast during the opening and closing credits.
- The Chumbawamba song "The Good Ship Lifestyle" on the album Tubthumper mentions Shipping Forecast regions (in the wrong order):
  Faeroes, Bailey, Fair Isle, Hebrides
  Malin, Rockall, Shannon, Sole
  Trafalgar, Finisterre, Irish Sea, Biscay
  Humber, Portland, Cromarty, Forth, Tyne
  ...
  Dogger, Fisher, German Bight; Viking, Thames, Dover, Wight (3x)
  Dogger, Fisher, German Bight
  ...
- Radiohead used lyrics relating to the Shipping Forecast in their song "In Limbo" to represent a theme of being lost:
  Lundy, Fastnet, Irish Sea
  I've got a message I can't read
  This song appears on the album Kid A, the vinyl release of which has the names of several of the forecast's sea areas etched into the runoff space.
- Dry the River song "New Ceremony" on the album Shallow Bed includes lyrics:
  But after we danced to the shipping forecast
  the words escaped your mouth...
- The Arctic Monkeys song "Anyways," a B-side of their "Tranquility Base Hotel & Casino" single, includes lyrics:
  Listening to the shipping forecast
  Driving to the airport...
- The Mekons song "Shanty" from The Edge of the World begins with a sample of the shipping forecast, and includes the lyrics:
  Concrete and steel and a flame in the night
  Cromarty Dogger and Bight
- In the opening ceremony for the 2012 Olympic Games in London, the shipping forecast was played in the opening part of the production with Elgar's Nimrod to represent Britain's maritime heritage.
- The Young Punx sampled the shipping forecast as read by BBC presenter Alan Smith for their track "Rockall". The shipping forecast forms the entire lyric for the track, both used in its original form (yet rhyming and scanning) e.g. "Tyne, Dogger, German Bight. Humber, Thames, Dover, Wight" and also with the words re-edited into new orders to form new meanings and puns such as "expected to, Rock All, by midnight tonight".
- Other popular artists who have used samples of the Shipping Forecast include Andy White who added the forecast to the track "The Whole Love Story" to create a very nostalgic, cosy and soporific sound, highly evocative of the British Isles.
- Tears for Fears, whose track "Pharaohs" (a play on the name of the sea area "Faeroes") is a setting of the forecast to a mixture of mellow music and sound effects. The song is also on Tears for Fears' compilation album Saturnine Martial & Lunatic.
- Thomas Dolby, who included a shipping forecast read by the BBC's John Marsh on the track "Windpower".
- The British DJ Rob Overseer's album Wreckage has a final track entitled "Heligoland", where the Shipping Forecast surrealistically alternates between reporting the weather and the emotional states of an individual.
- The band British Sea Power entitled a B-side of their "Please Stand Up" single "Gale Warnings in Viking North".
- Beck includes a 27-second sample five minutes into the track "The Horrible Fanfare/Landslide/Exoskeleton" on the album The Information.
- The experimental electronic musician Robin Storey, recording under the name Rapoon, sampled the shipping forecast for the track "Falling More Slowly" on his 1997 album Easterly 6 or 7, itself named for the Forecast.
- The Prodigy sampled a short section of the shipping forecast in their song "Weather Experience" on their album Experience.
- Manfred Mann's Earth Band extensively used samples of shipping forecasts as a part of the backing track to "Stranded", from their 1980 album, Chance.
- The Jethro Tull album Stormwatch features the shipping forecast between verses of "North Sea Oil". It is read by Francis Wilson, a TV weatherman who also reads the introduction to "Dun Ringill" on the same album.
- Silly Wizard includes a snippet of a gale warning from the shipping forecast in the closing instrumental of "The Fishermen's Song", which tells of the loss of a fishing boat in a North Sea storm.
- Shipping Forecast by the composer Cecilia McDowall was commissioned by Portsmouth Festival Choir and conducted by Andrew Cleary. It was first performed in June 2011. The work combines the poetry of Seán Street, Psalm 107, and the words of the shipping forecast itself.
- There is a three-bell change ringing method named "Shipping Forecast Singles". It was composed by Sam Austin and was rung to a peal in 2004 at St John the Baptist in Middleton, Warwickshire. Other three-bell methods by the same composer are named after various shipping areas.
- Justin Sullivan, lead vocalist and founding member of New Model Army, released a solo album in 2003 called Navigating by the Stars. Featuring a nautical theme, the album samples part of the Shipping Forecast on the track "Ocean Rising".
- In 1966, four English singers calling themselves The Master Singers released a record of "The Weather Forecast" which was a typical Shipping Forecast sung in Anglican chant.
- The Creative Commons-licensed artist Cakeflap's song, "The Bakery Is Open", contains a mock version of the shipping forecast, with several areas and weathers altered.
- The Mull Historical Society's single "The Final Arrears" ends with a twenty-second recording of the Shipping Forecast from "Tuesday 17th October" (presumably 2000).
- The 2018 album Between Wind and Water by British folk band The Longest Johns ends with the bonus track "Shipping Forecast" parodying the BBC forecast format. The band is known for covering sea shanties and their music's maritime theme.
- The 2020 Harry Harris EP Open Up The Pit includes a track, "While The Radio Plays" which features the regions of shipping forecast in its chorus.

=== Radio ===
Frank Muir and Denis Norden parodied the Shipping Forecast in a song written for an episode of Take It From Here:

In Ross and Finistère
The outlook is sinisterre
Rockall and Lundy
Will clear up by Monday

Dead Ringers parodied the Shipping Forecast using Brian Perkins rapping the forecast ("Dogger, Fisher, German Bight – becoming quite cyclonic. Occasional showers making you feel cat-atatatatatata-tonic..."). Many other versions have been used including a "Dale Warning" to warn where Dale Winton could be found over the coming period, and a spoof in which sailors are warned of ghostly galleons and other nightmarish apparitions.

Stephen Fry, in his 1988 radio programme Saturday Night Fry, issued the following "Shipping Forecast" in the first episode of the programme:

And now, before the news and weather, here is the Shipping Forecast issued by the Meteorological Office at 1400 hours Greenwich Mean Time.
Finisterre, Dogger, Rockall, Bailey: no.
Wednesday, variable, imminent, super.
South Utsire, North Utsire, Sheerness, Foulness, Eliot Ness:
If you will, often, eminent, 447, 22 yards, touchdown, stupidly.
Malin, Hebrides, Shetland, Jersey, Fair Isle, Turtle-Neck, Tank Top, Courtelle:
Blowy, quite misty, sea sickness. Not many fish around, come home, veering suggestively.
That was the Shipping Forecast for 0700 hours, Wednesday 18 August.

The BBC Radio 4 monologue sketch show One features a number of Shipping Forecast parodies, written by David Quantick and Daniel Maier, such as the following, originally broadcast on BBC Radio 4 on Thursday 21 February 2008:

And now with the time approaching 5 pm,
It's time for the mid-life crisis forecast...

Forties; restless: three or four.
Marriage: stale; becoming suffocating.
Sportscar, jeans and t-shirt; westerly, five.
Waitress; blonde; 19 or 20.
Converse All-Stars; haircut; earring; children;
becoming embarrassed.
Tail between legs; atmosphere frosty;
Spare room: five or six.

In an episode of the BBC Radio 4 series Live on Arrival, Steve Punt reads the Shopping Forecast, in which the regions are replaced with supermarket names, e.g. "Tesco, Fine Fare, Sainsbury". The sketch ends with the information, "joke mileage decreasing, end of show imminent".

On the broadcast at 0048 on Saturday 19 March 2011, the area forecasts were delivered by John Prescott to raise awareness of Red Nose Day 2011, a charity event organised by Comic Relief. The format then reverted to the BBC continuity announcer Alice Arnold for the reports on coastal areas. On delivering the area forecast for Humber, Prescott (who had represented the parliamentary constituency of Kingston upon Hull East for almost 40 years before retiring) slipped deliberately into his distinctive East Yorkshire accent – "'Umber – without the 'H', as we say it up there".

The comedian Marti Caine listed the Shipping Forecast as one of her eight records when she made her second appearance on Desert Island Discs on 24 March 1991.

The BBC Radio 1 That's What He Said podcast by Greg James featured the shipping forecast being read out by Grace Hopper. This was done to make light of her inability to pronounce certain words.

On his 28 December 2024 BBC Radio 6 show, Gilles Peterson paid tribute to "100 years of The Shipping Forecast" playing "Seamus Heaney The Shipping Forecast - Poem".

On 1 January 2025 BBC Radio 4 broadcast a series of programmes under the title "Shipping Forecast Day", to mark the start of a year of celebrations of the centenary of the Shipping Forecast.

=== Film and television ===
Terence Davies' film Distant Voices, Still Lives, a largely autobiographical account of growing up in Liverpool during the 1940s and 1950s, opens with a shipping forecast from this period.

In an episode of the BBC sitcom Keeping Up Appearances, a soon-to-be-sailing Hyacinth Bucket calls over the telephone for an advance shipping forecast, even though the yacht she and her husband Richard are to visit is moored on the Thames near Oxford. Names mentioned (in scene sequence) are: Fisher, German Bight and Cromarty, Dogger and Heligoland (also known as German Bight).

In an episode of the BBC sitcom Ever Decreasing Circles, Howard and Hilda leave their neighbour Paul's house party early, explaining that they must get back to listen to the Shipping Forecast. Paul asks why, seeing as they have never owned a boat. Howard explains, "Well, it takes us nicely into the news."

Mentioned briefly in the film Kes.

A recording of part of the forecast is played over the opening and closing credits of Rick Stein's 2000 TV series Rick Stein's Seafood Lover's Guide.

In an episode of the Channel 4 television series Black Books, the character Fran Katzenjammer listens to the shipping forecast because a friend from her college (played by Peter Serafinowicz) is reading it. She finds his voice arousing.

In the BBC sitcom As Time Goes By, the character Mrs Bale is obsessed by and constantly mentions The Shipping Forecast much to the befuddlement of the other characters.

Many characters in the 1983 children's cartoon, The Adventures of Portland Bill are named after features mentioned in the Shipping Forecast.

In the 2011 movie Page Eight, the Shipping Forecast plays as the main protagonist Jonnie Worricker drives his car through London late at night.

In the movie I, Daniel Blake, the titular character's late wife is said to have been a listener of the Shipping Forecast, with Daniel playing "Sailing By" on a cassette. The song is played at the end of the film at Daniel's funeral.

In the 2020 movie Supernova, depicting the caravan holiday of an American-British gay couple (Stanley Tucci and Colin Firth), the Shipping Forecast comes on the car radio, prompting the American to wonder aloud, "How many decades do you have to live in this country for that to make any sense?"

The actress Olivia Colman has said that listening to the Shipping Forecast through an earpiece helps her keep her emotions in check while filming some of the more emotional scenes on The Crown, to accurately portray the cool and collected character of the monarch Elizabeth II.

=== Video games ===
In Funcom's massively multiplayer online role-playing game The Secret World, the shipping forecast plays over the radio in a London Underground station, adding to the British flavour distinguishing the setting from other worldwide locations featured in the game.

The shipping forecast is present as a background element in The Chinese Room's 2024 game Still Wakes the Deep, in which it is often heard on radios found around the oil rig.

=== Literature ===
A number of minor characters in Jasper Fforde's first novel, The Eyre Affair, are named after Sea Areas in the shipping forecast.

Charlie Connelly's 2004 book Attention All Shipping (Little Brown: ISBN 0-316-72474-2) describes a project to visit every sea area with any land, and to travel by air or sea over the others.

In the New York Times magazine dated 19 February 2023, the letter of recommendation by Grace Linden was an article on the shipping forecast, in which she stated: "Like the sea itself, the Shipping Forecast is a reminder of the larger, more elemental forces at play, those things that are much more powerful than any of our individual worries or wants."

Moderate Becoming Good Later (Summersdale: ISBN 978-1800076105) is a 2023 book by siblings Toby and Katie Carr, describing Toby's kayaking trip around the shipping areas; Katie completed the book, from Toby's notes, after his death.

In Carol Ann Duffy's poem Prayer, the final line is "Darkness outside. Inside, the radio's prayer - Rockall. Malin. Dogger. Finisterre."

In Amelia Ellis' 2008 novel The Fourth Aspect, the protagonist is overcome by an emotional reaction when by chance listening to the shipping forecast on a road trip from London to the Scottish Highlands, leading her to the realization that "Sometimes we hold on to things or people for reasons that have nothing to do with them at all."

In 2025, Rob Stepney and Kathy Clugston published Good, Occasionally Rhyming: A celebration of the Shipping Forecast in poetry and prose (August Books, ISBN 978-1835983300). The TLS's reviewer described it as "a worthwhile anthology hidden in a lavatory book".

=== Art ===
For his project The Shipping Forecast – an Artist's Journey, which began in 2015, the Troon-based artist Ian Rawnsley plans to travel by sea through each of the sea areas and create a painting inspired by each, to raise funds for Macmillan Cancer Support.

=== Bedtime story ===
In March 2017, Peter Jefferson recorded a reinvented version of the Shipping Forecast as "a bedtime story for grown-ups".
