= Palaeo-Yare =

Submerged river in the North Sea

Coordinates: 52.5662°N 1.9122°E

Palaeo-Yare (North Sea)

The Palaeo-Yare is a submerged river system in today's southern North Sea (part of Dogger Bank) that was above sea level during the early Middle Palaeolithic It is an extension of today's River Yare in Norfolk. Dredging of the sediments of submerged river system provides aggregates for construction and maintaining beaches, but has also been the source of archaeological finds showing human habitation of that area during the Middle Palaeolithic.

== See also ==
- Doggerland
