= Sole Bank =

Sand bank in the Atlantic Ocean

The Sole Bank is a sand bank in the Atlantic Ocean, south-west of Cornwall.

== Bank ==
It gives its name to a sea area in the Shipping Forecast. Conventionally it is divided between the Great Sole Bank and Little Sole Bank. It takes its name from the sole fish, common in these waters.

The areas are defined for fishery protection purposes being bounded by coastline or lines of latitude or longitude which connect specified points:

- Little Sole Bank (ICES Statistical Division VIIh)
  - 48°N 5°W
  - 49°30'N 5°W
  - 49°30'N 7°W
  - 50°N 7°W
  - 50°N 9°W
  - 48°N 9°W
  - 48°N 5°W
- Great Sole Bank (ICES Statistical Division VIIj)
  - 48°N 9°W
  - 9°W on the south coast of Ireland
  - 52°30'N on the west coast of Ireland
  - 52°30'N 12°W
  - 48°N 12°W
  - 48°N 9°W
