= Inshore coastal areas of the United Kingdom =

Coastlines used in weather forecasting

A map indicating the locations of the areas listed in the inshore weather forecast

The inshore coastal areas of the United Kingdom are 15 fixed stretches of coastline that are used in weather forecasting especially for wind-powered or small coastal craft. Each area is delimited by geographical features such as headlands, seaports or estuaries. When used as part of a broadcast weather forecast they are mentioned in the same order, clockwise round the mainland starting and finishing in the north west of the island of Great Britain. The Isle of Man is included in the forecasts but it is not part of the United Kingdom.

== List of inshore coastal areas ==
1. Cape Wrath – Rattray Head including Orkney
2. Rattray Head – Berwick on Tweed
3. Berwick on Tweed – Whitby
4. Whitby – Gibraltar Point
5. Gibraltar Point – North Foreland
6. North Foreland – Selsey Bill
7. Selsey Bill – Lyme Regis
8. Lyme Regis – Land's End including the Isles of Scilly
9. Land's End – St David's Head including the Bristol Channel
10. St David's Head – Great Orme's Head including St George's Channel
11. Great Orme's Head – Mull of Galloway
12. Isle of Man
13. Lough Foyle – Carlingford Lough (covers the entire coastline of Northern Ireland)
14. Mull of Galloway – Mull of Kintyre including the Firth of Clyde and the North Channel
15. Mull of Kintyre – Ardnamurchan Point
16. Ardnamurchan Point – Cape Wrath including the Outer Hebrides
17. Shetland Isles

The BBC's coastal forecast splits some of these into shorter lengths of coast. The points at which they are split are Duncansby Head, Fife Ness, Harwich, Thames Estuary, Beachy Head, The Solent, St Albans Head, Start Point, Hartland Point, Holyhead, Morecambe Bay, Firth of Clyde. Additionally, there is a forecast for the Channel Islands.

== See also ==
- Coastline of the United Kingdom
- Shipping Forecast
- List of coastal weather stations in the British Isles
