= Doggerland =

Former landmass in Northern Europe

Coordinates: 52.°N 3°E

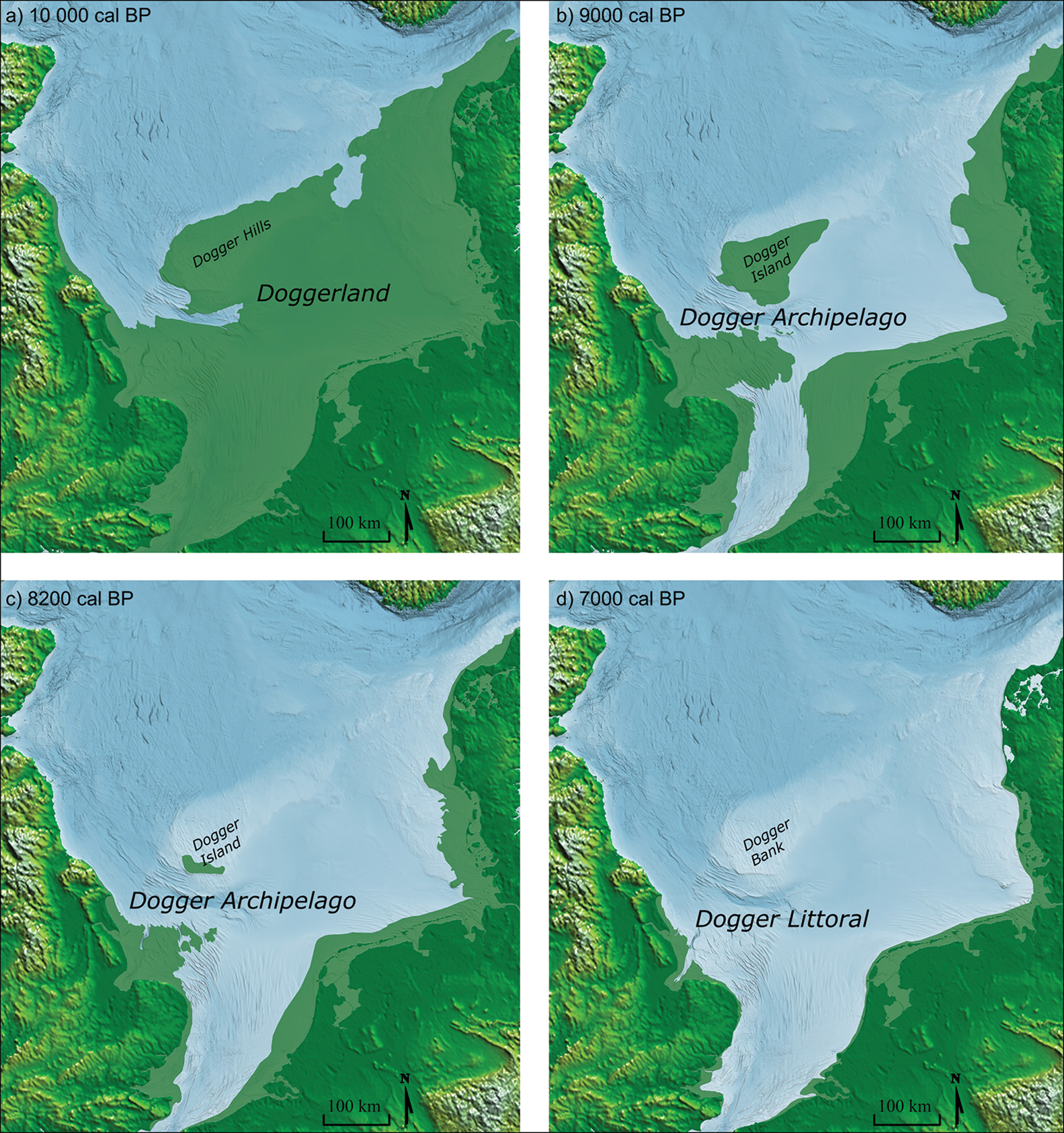
Map of Doggerland c. 10,000 years Before Present (~8,000 BCE) (top left) and its subsequent disintegration by 7,000 BP (~5,000 BCE)

Doggerland was a large area of land in Northern Europe, now submerged beneath the southern North Sea. This region was repeatedly exposed at various times during the Pleistocene epoch due to the lowering of sea levels during glacial periods. However, the term "Doggerland" is generally used for this region during the Late Pleistocene and Early Holocene. During the early Holocene following the glacial retreat at the end of the Last Glacial Period, the exposed land area of Doggerland stretched across the region between what is now the east coast of Great Britain, northern France, Belgium, the Netherlands, north-western Germany, and the Danish peninsula of Jutland. Between 10,000 and 7,000 years ago, Doggerland was inundated by rising sea levels, disintegrating initially into a series of low-lying islands before submerging completely. The impact of the tsunami generated by the Storegga underwater landslide c. 8,200 years ago on Doggerland is controversial. The flooded land is known as the Dogger Littoral.

Doggerland was named after the present-time Dogger Bank (which in turn was named after 17th-century Dutch fishing boats called doggers), which is the remains of a highland region that became submerged later than the rest of Doggerland.

The archaeological potential of the area was first identified in the early 20th century. Interest intensified in 1931 when a fishing trawler operating east of the Wash dragged up a barbed antler point that was subsequently dated to a time when the area was tundra. Vessels have since dragged up remains of mammoths, lions and other animals, and a few prehistoric tools and weapons. Most archaeological evidence of human habitation dates to the Mesolithic period during the early Holocene.

== Formation ==
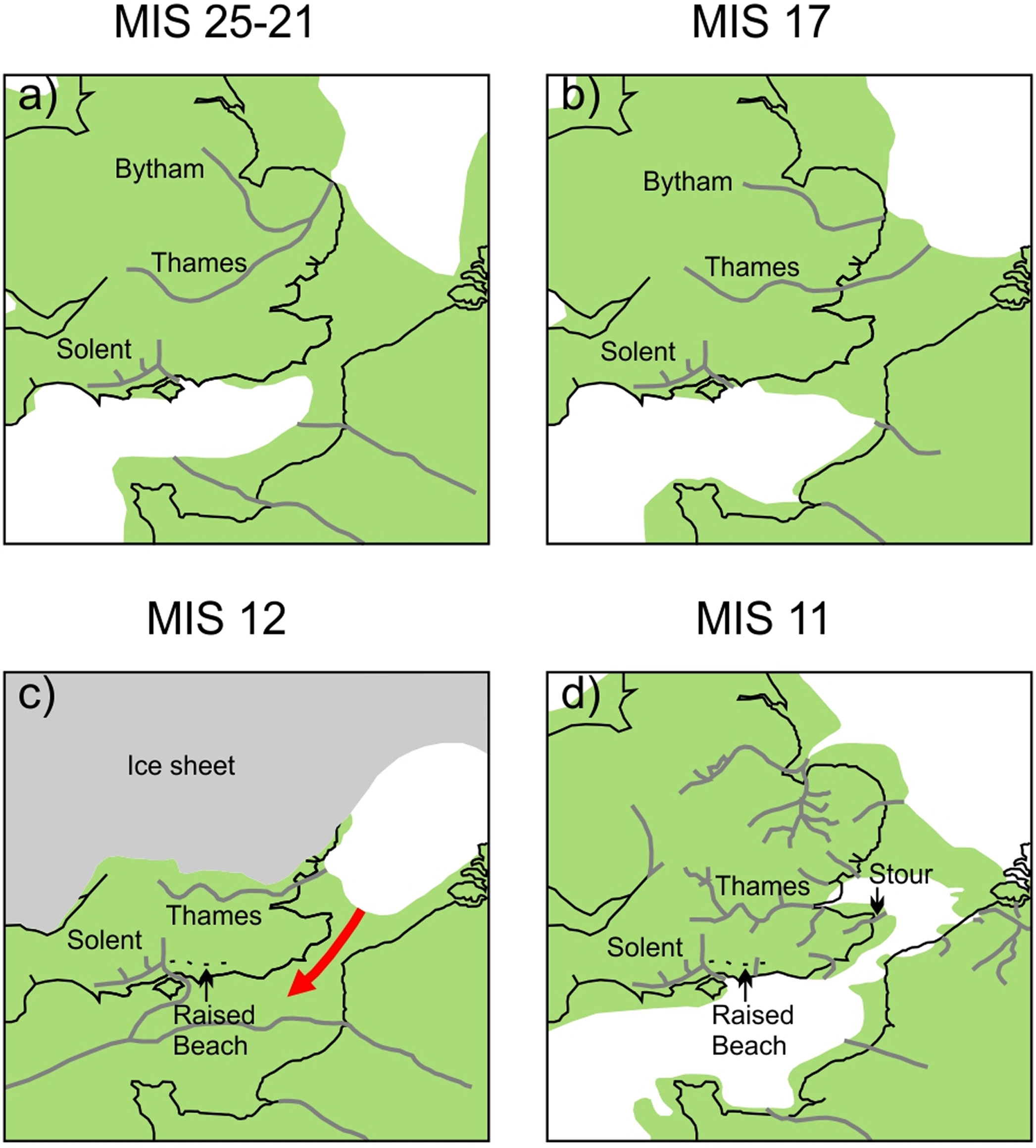
Situation of the southern North Sea during Marine Isotope Stages (MIS) 25-21 (c. 1 million-800,000 years ago) MIS 17 (c. 700,000 years ago), MIS 12 (Anglian) glaciation (c. 480-425,000 years ago) and MIS 11 (Hoxnian) interglacial (c. 425-375,000 years ago)

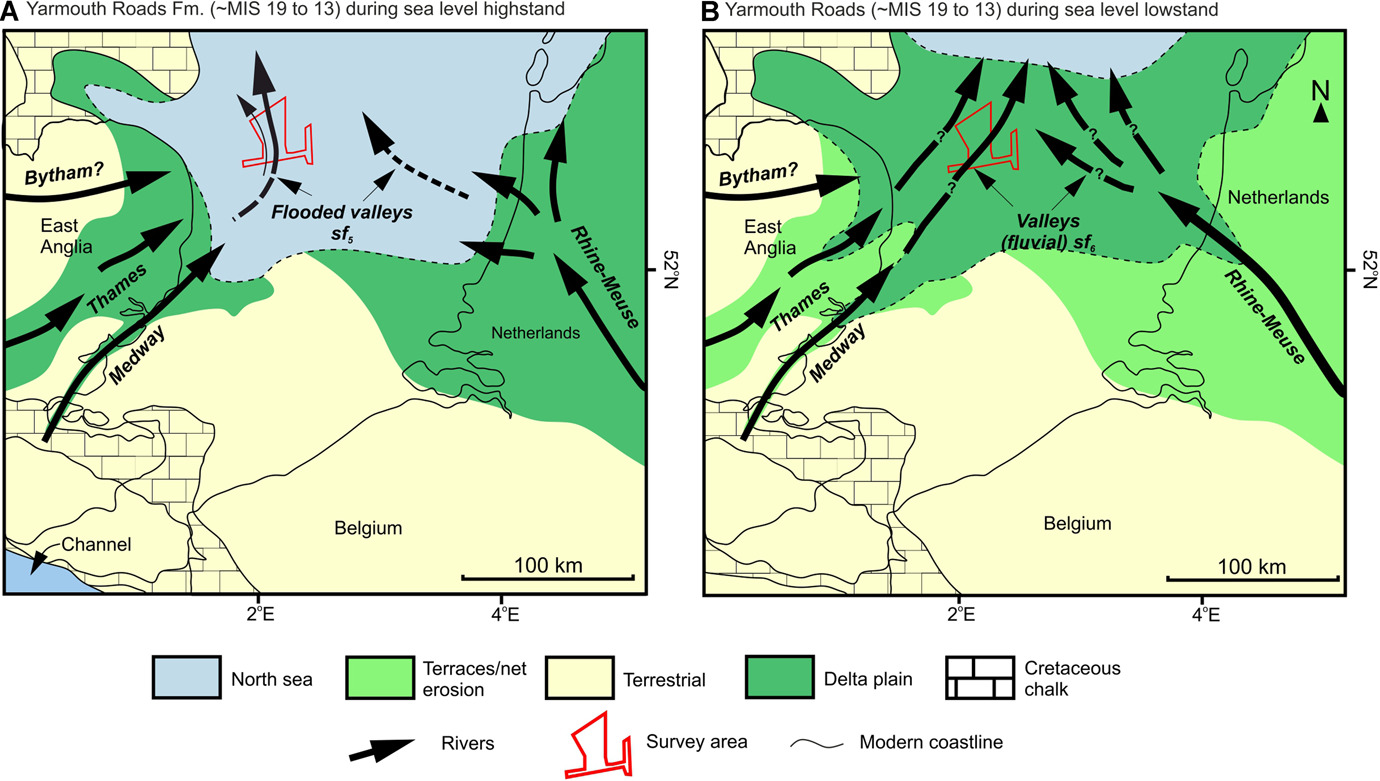
Paleogeography of the southern North Sea during Marine Isotope Stages (MIS) 19-13 (c. 800,000-480,000 years ago) during episodes of high (left) and low (right) sea level

During the Early Pleistocene and early Middle Pleistocene, Great Britain was a peninsula of Europe, connected by the massive chalk Weald–Artois Anticline across the Strait of Dover. During the Anglian stage (Marine Isotope Stage 12), about 450,000 years ago, an ice sheet filled much of the North Sea, with a large proglacial lake in the southern part fed by the Rhine, the Scheldt and the Thames. The catastrophic overflow of this lake carved a channel through the anticline, leading to the formation of the Channel River, which carried the combined waters of the Rhine, the Scheldt, and the Thames to the Atlantic. This probably created the potential for Great Britain to become isolated from the continent during periods of high sea level, although some scientists argue that the final break did not occur until a second ice-dammed lake overflowed during the MIS 8 or MIS 6 glaciations, around 340,000 or 240,000 years ago. Kim Cohen and Marc Hijma date the final destruction of the Weald–Artois Anticline to the severe Saalian Glaciation, which reached its peak around 160,000 years ago, and ended with a second meltwater lake around 130,000 years ago.

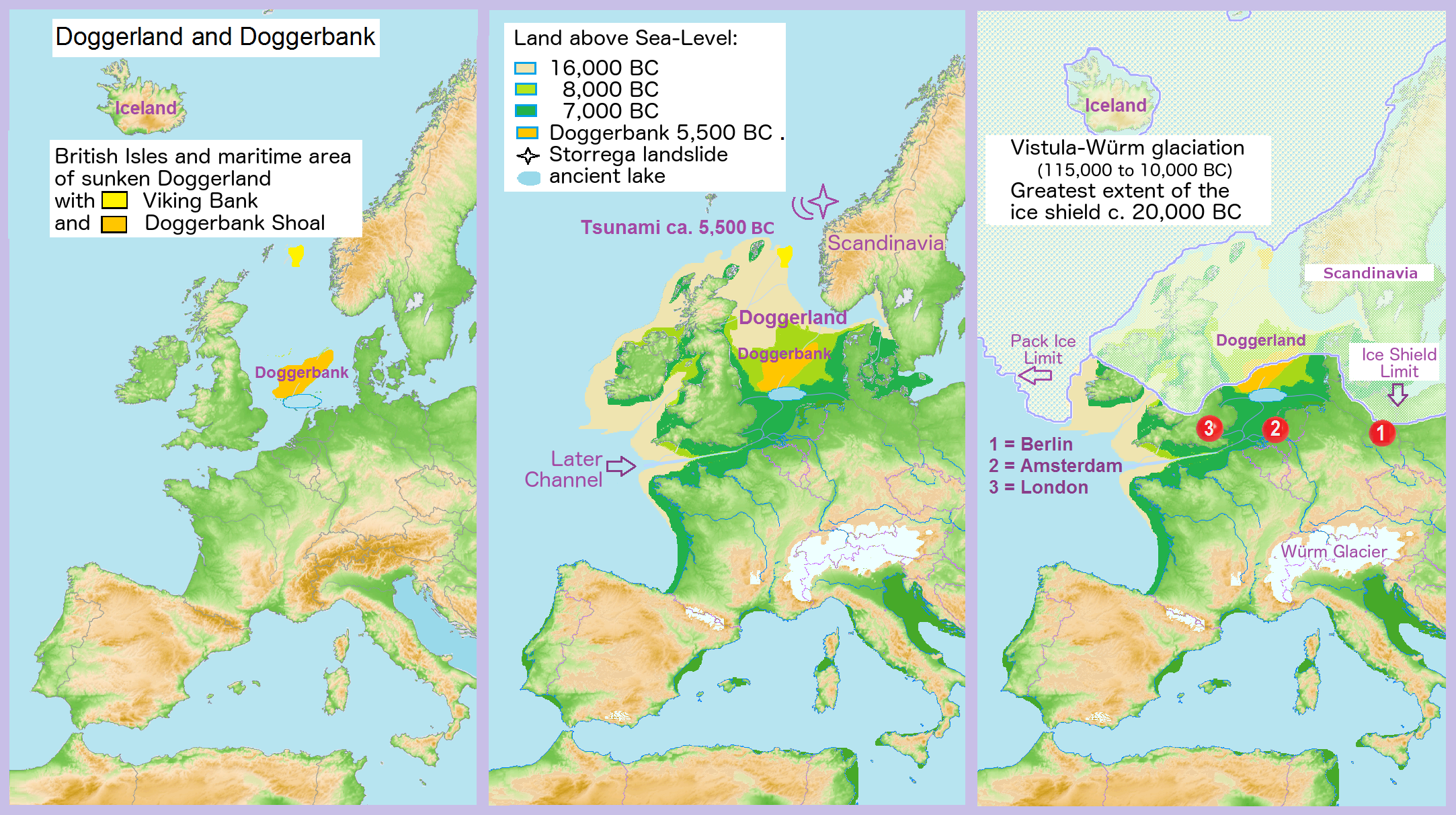
A map showing the hypothetical extent of Doggerland from now back to the Weichselian glaciation

The topography of Doggerland including the Dogger Bank as it existed during the early Holocene was primarily shaped by a "complex interplay between climatic variations, [British-Irish and Fennoscandian] ice sheet dynamics and sea level change" during the Last Glacial Period. During the most intense glaciation of the Last Glacial Maximum, the North Sea and much of the British Isles were covered with glacial ice, and the sea level was about 120 m (390 ft) lower. The climate later became warmer, and around 12,000 BCE, Great Britain, as well as much of the North Sea and the English Channel, was an expanse of low-lying tundra. During this period, from around 31,600 to 23,100 years ago, Dogger Bank was formed from glaciolacustrine sediments and subsequently shaped into a thrust moraine as a result of glacial-tectonic action from the adjacent proglacial lake.

Evidence, including the contours of the present seabed, indicates that after the first main Ice Age the watershed between the North Sea and the English Channel extended east from East Anglia, then southeast to the Hook of Holland, rather than across the Strait of Dover. The Seine, the Thames, the Meuse, the Scheldt, and the Rhine joined and flowed west along the English Channel as a broad, slow river before eventually reaching the Atlantic Ocean. In about 10,000 BCE the north-facing coastal area of Doggerland had a coastline of lagoons, saltmarshes, mudflats and beaches as well as inland streams, rivers, marshes and lakes. It may have been Europe's most prosperous hunting, fowling, and fishing ground in the Mesolithic.

One extensive river system found by a 3D seismic survey undertaken by the Birmingham "North Sea Palaeolandscapes Project" drained the southeastern part of the Dogger Bank hill area into the east end of the Outer Silver Pit lake. It has been named the Shotton River after the Birmingham geologist Frederick William Shotton.

== Disappearance ==
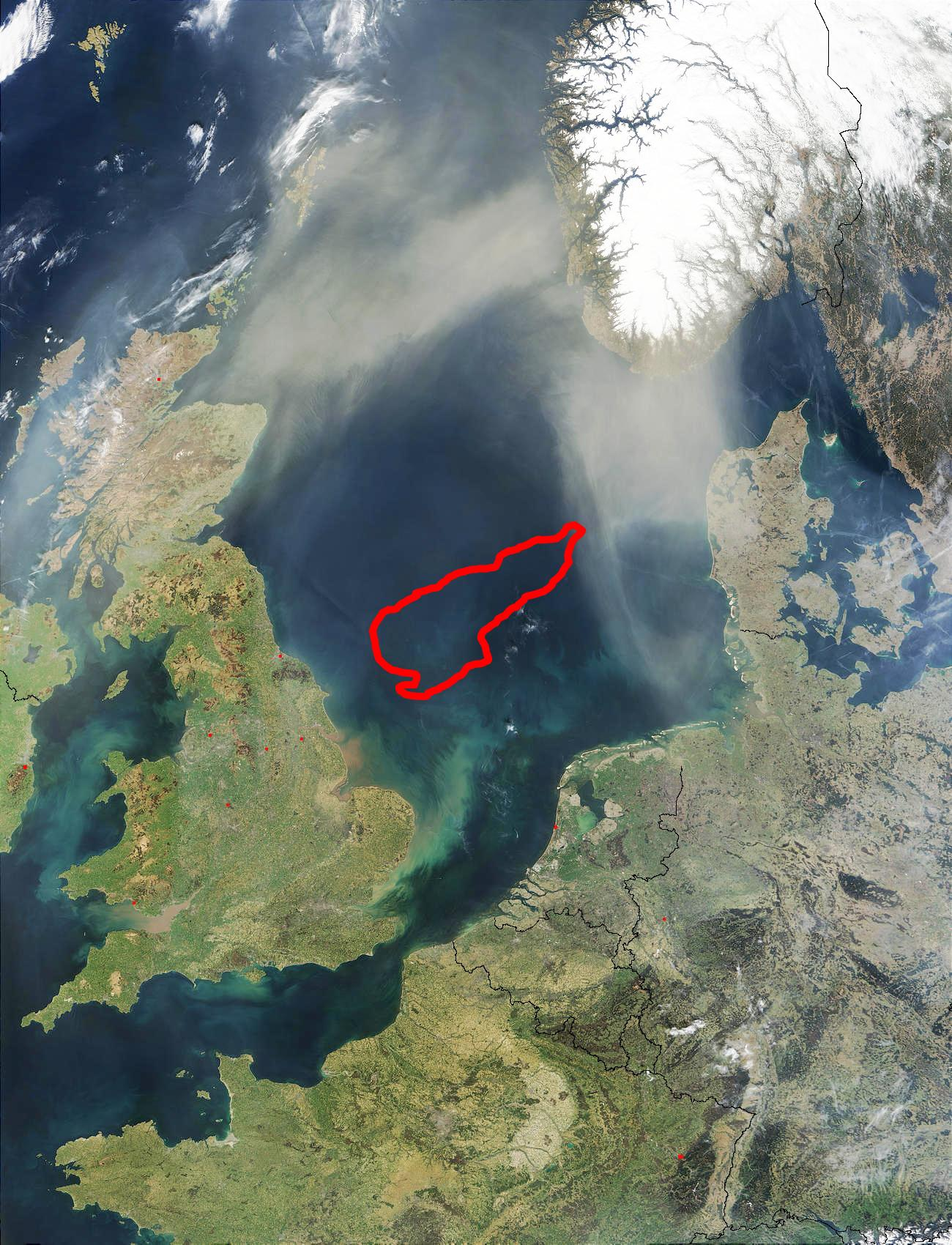
The red line marks Dogger Bank, which is most likely a moraine formed in the Pleistocene

As the ice melted at the end of the last glacial period of the current ice age, sea levels rose, and the land began to tilt in an isostatic adjustment as the huge weight of ice lessened. Doggerland eventually became submerged, cutting off what was previously the British peninsula from the European mainland by around 6500 BCE. The Dogger Bank, an upland area of Doggerland, remained an island until at least 5000 BCE. Key stages are now believed to have included the gradual evolution of a large tidal bay between eastern England and Dogger Bank by 9000 BCE and a rapid sea level rise thereafter, leading to Dogger Bank becoming an island and Britain becoming physically disconnected from the continent.

A recent hypothesis suggests that around 6200 BCE much of the remaining coastal land was flooded by a tsunami caused by a submarine landslide off the coast of Norway known as the Storegga Slide. This suggests "that the Storegga Slide tsunami would have had a catastrophic impact on the contemporary coastal Mesolithic population ... Britain finally became separated from the continent and in cultural terms, the Mesolithic there goes its own way." It is estimated that up to a quarter of the Mesolithic population of Britain lost their lives. A study published in 2014 suggested that the only remaining parts of Doggerland at the time of the Storegga Slide were low-lying islands, but supported the view that the area had been abandoned at about the same time as the tsunamis.

Another view speculates that the Storegga tsunami devastated Doggerland, but then ebbed back into the sea, and that later Lake Agassiz (in North America) burst, releasing so much fresh water that sea levels rose over about two years to flood much of Doggerland and make Great Britain an island. The difference in the distribution of broken shells between lower-lying and high-lying parts of the area also suggests the survival of land after the Storegga tsunami.

== Discovery and investigation by archaeologists ==
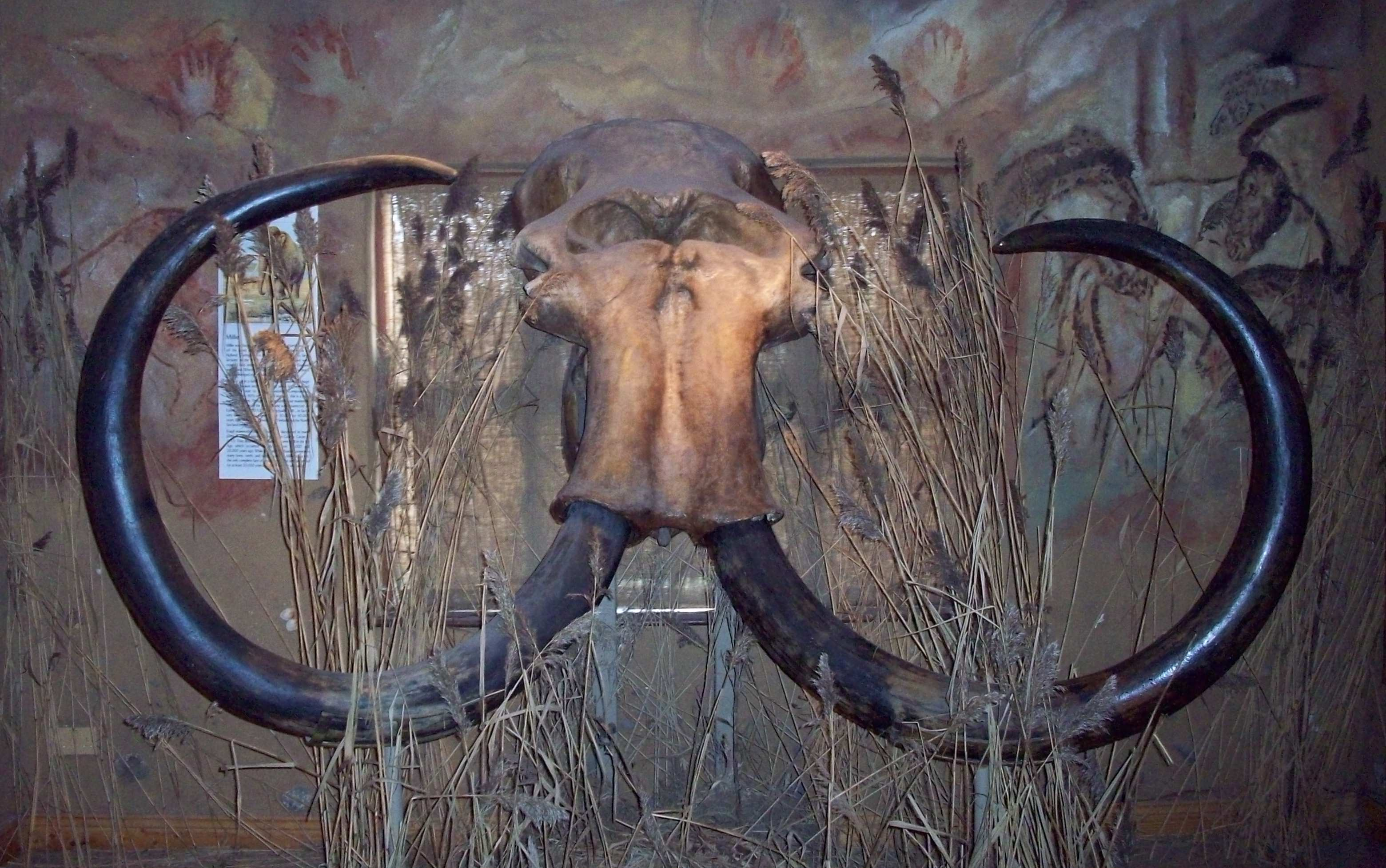
A Woolly mammoth skull discovered by fishermen in the North Sea, at the Celtic and Prehistoric Museum, Ireland

The existence of what is now known as Doggerland was established in the late 19th century. The remains of plants brought to the surface from Dogger Bank were studied in 1913 by Clement Reid, and the remains of animals and worked flints from the Neolithic period had also been found. In his book The Antiquity of Man of 1915, anatomist Sir Arthur Keith discussed the archaeological potential of the area. In 1931, the trawler Colinda hauled up a lump of peat whilst fishing near the Ower Bank, 40 km (25 mi) east of Norfolk. The peat was found to contain a barbed antler point, possibly used as a harpoon or fish spear, 220 mm (8.5 in) long, which dated from between 10,000 and 4,000 BCE when the area was tundra.

Interest was reinvigorated in the 1990s by Bryony Coles, who named the area "Doggerland" "after the great banks in the southern North Sea" and produced speculative maps of the area, although she recognised that the current relief of the southern North Sea seabed is not a sound guide to the topography of Doggerland.

Between 2003 and 2007, a team at the University of Birmingham led by Vince Gaffney and Ken Thomson mapped around 23,000 km^{2} (8,900 sq mi) of the Early Holocene landscape, using seismic data provided for research by Petroleum Geo-Services, as part of the work of the University of Birmingham North Sea Palaeolandscapes Project. The results of this study were published as a technical monograph and a popular book on the history and archaeology of Doggerland. Names have been given to some of its features: "The Spines" to a system of dunes above the broad "Shotton River", the upland area of the "Dogger Bank", a basin between two huge sandbanks called "The Outer Silver Pit".

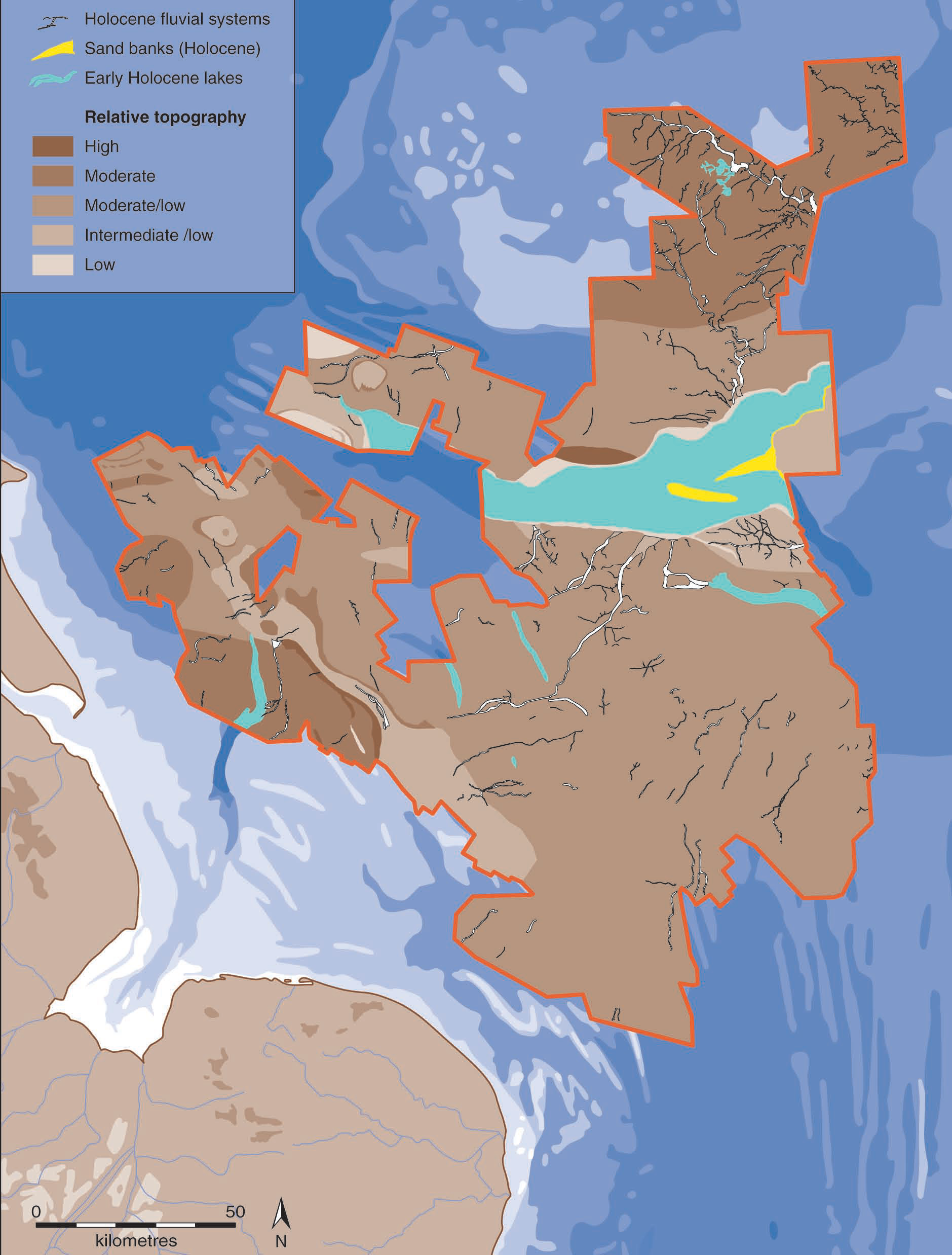
Early Holocene landscape features off the coast of the UK, mapped by the North Sea Palaeolandscapes Project

A skull fragment of a Neanderthal, dated at over 40,000 years old, was recovered from material dredged from the Middeldiep, some 16 km (10 mi) off the coast of Zeeland, and exhibited in Leiden in 2009. In March 2010, it was reported that recognition of the potential archaeological importance of the area could affect the future development of offshore wind farms. In 2019, a flint flake partially covered in birch bark tar dredged up off the coast of the Netherlands provided valuable insight into Neanderthal technology and cognitive evolution.

In 2012, the results of a study of Doggerland by the universities of Birmingham, St Andrews, Dundee, and Aberdeen, including surveys of artefacts, were displayed at the Royal Society summer exhibition in London. Richard Bates of St Andrews University said:

We have speculated for years on the lost land's existence from bones dredged by fishermen all over the North Sea, but it's only since working with oil companies in the last few years that we have been able to re-create what this lost land looked like ... We have now been able to model its flora and fauna, build up a picture of the ancient people that lived there and begin to understand some of the dramatic events that subsequently changed the land, including the sea rising and a devastating tsunami.

Since 2015, the University of Bradford's Europe's Lost Frontiers project has continued mapping the prehistoric landscapes of Doggerland and has used this data to direct a programme of extensive coring of marine palaeochannels. Sediment from the cores has provided sedimentary DNA and conventional environmental data. These will be used in a major computational modelling programme replicating colonisation of the submerged landscape.

In 2019, a team of scientists from the University of Bradford and Ghent University found a hammerstone flint on the seabed 40 km (25 mi) off the coast of Cromer, Norfolk, from a depth of 32 m (105 ft), which could point to the existence of prehistoric settlements.

Doggerland was a lush land filled with a wide variety of vegetation, animals, and geographical features that supported a large portion of Europe's Mesolithic population. Evidence of wetlands, lakes, and rivers has been found, which would have attracted wildlife like waterfowl and other game; while dense woodlands also covered the varying terrain of hills and valleys.

During Doggerland's existence, the area was inhabited by a wide range of cultures but two groups primarily occupied the area during the Mesolithic and landmass's later stages. These cultures preceded each other with the northern Maglemosian culture first appearing between 9,000 and 6,000 BCE. The Maglemosian culture was characterized by microliths, axes, and several other tools made from stone and bone. These artifacts have been found in the North Sea, with one notable find of a red deer antler barbed point discovered in peat from the bottom of the sea. This piece, among others, matched the technique and style of Maglemosian groups and solidified evidence of human occupancy in the area while giving insight into the culture and environment of Doggerland.

The Maglemosian culture was succeeded by the Kongemose culture and during this transition, the land changed severely as Doggerland was swallowed up by the North Sea, assisted by natural disasters like the Storegga tsunami and the bursting of Lake Agassiz. The period experienced significant change and eventually gave rise to the Kongemose culture which existed between 6,000 to 5,200 BCE. Doggerland was almost gone by the start of the Kongemose culture, likely reduced from the former expansive land bridge to several low-lying islands which forced people to change their lifestyles to suit their new world. This transition is evidenced by the findings of kitchen middens and fishing related tools from latter groups like the Ertebølle culture.

An internationally significant early Middle Palaeolithic assemblage from the southern North Sea was also discovered through aggregate dredging off the coast of Norfolk. The cultural material was found to be associated with a floodplain deposit of the now submerged Palaeo-Yare river system.

Ancient artefacts have been found by beachcombers in material dredged from the sea bottom 13 km (8.1 mi) offshore and spread on a Dutch beach in 2012, as a coastal protection measure.

Doggerland was the subject of a 2007 episode of the Channel 4 Time Team documentary series called "Britain's Drowned World". (Note: Technical advice for "Britain's Drowned World" was provided by Vincent Gaffney, co-author of Europe's Lost World: The Rediscovery of Doggerland, and the presenter of the programme, Tony Robinson, wrote a foreword to the book.)

Notable past (purple) and current (orange) land bridges on a bathymetric equirectangular projection centred on 45° E

== See also ==
- Lost lands – Islands or continents supposedly existing during prehistory, having since disappeared
- Maglemosian culture – Culture of Early Mesolithic Period in Northern Europe
- Norwegian trench – Elongated depression in the sea floor off the southern coast of Norway
- Outburst flood – High-magnitude, low-frequency catastrophic flood involving the sudden release of water
- Paleoshoreline – Shoreline which existed in the geologic past
- Submerged continent – Large continental mass mainly undersea
- Viking-Bergen Banks – Underwater hills in the North Sea

== Sources ==
- Gaffney, Vincent; Fitch, Simon; Smith, David (2009). Europe's Lost World: The Rediscovery of Doggerland. Council for British Archaeology.
