= Greenwich Lightvessel =

Light vessel station in the English Channel

Greenwich
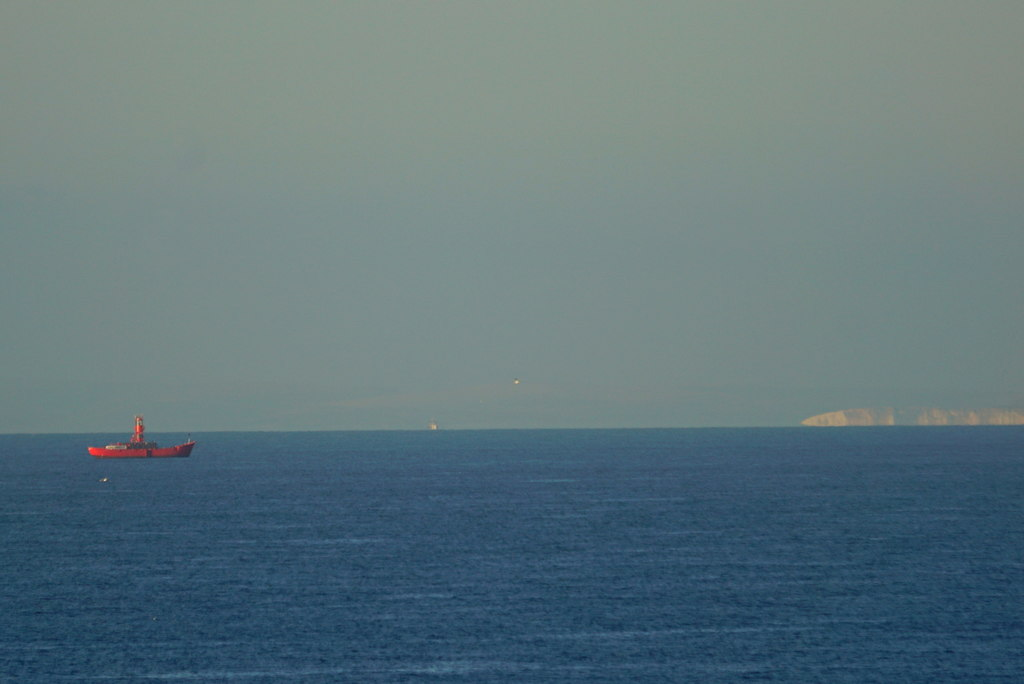
- Greenwich Lightvessel and Seven Sisters Cliffs

History

United Kingdom
- Namesake: Greenwich Meridian
- Operator: Trinity House
- Builder: Philip & Son, Dartmouth
- In service: 1947
- Identification: MMSI number: 992351032
- Status: Active as of 2026

General characteristics
- Type: Lightvessel
- Tonnage: 267 tonnes
- Length: 40 m (130 ft)
- Beam: 8 m (26 ft)
- Draught: 4.5 m (15 ft)
- Greenwich
- Constructed: 1995
- Height: 12 m (39 ft)
- Operator: Trinity House
- Focal height: 12 m (39 ft)
- Range: 15 nmi (28 km; 17 mi)
- Characteristic: Fl W 5s

Greenwich is a lightvessel station in the English Channel, off the coast of East Sussex. It is operated by Trinity House. It is one of the 22 coastal weather stations whose conditions are reported in the BBC Shipping Forecast but was dropped from broadcasts some time during 2019, before being reinstated. The name of the station derives from the fact that is located close to the Greenwich (or Prime) Meridian.

The vessel currently on this station is the solar powered Trinity House Lightvessel No. 5, built in 1946 and in active service at various stations around the British coast since 1947.

== Origins and stationing ==
The Greenwich station was established during the 19th century, a time when shipping traffic in and out of the Port of London was at its peak. The complexity of the Thames Estuary, with its shifting sands, narrow approaches, and strong tidal flows, made fixed lighthouses impractical in certain areas. As a solution, floating lightships such as the Greenwich Lightvessel were moored to provide reliable navigation aids.

== Design features ==
The vessel is painted in a distinctive red with the word "GREENWICH" displayed in bold white letters along its hull, in accordance with Trinity House standards for lightvessels. A lantern tower sits on the deck, equipped with modern optical technology that provides a bright and consistent light visible in various weather conditions.

The structure of the hull is engineered to provide stability while moored in open waters. It uses robust anchoring systems to remain secure even in adverse weather. Earlier versions of the Greenwich lightvessel employed oil lamps and fog bells, but modern adaptations now rely on electric beacons and automated fog signals.

== Role in modern navigation ==
The Greenwich Lightvessel continues to serve as a significant point of reference in the Thames maritime safety framework. Its light and AIS signals support real-time situational awareness for commercial shipping, fishing vessels, and recreational boaters. The lightvessel contributes to maintaining safe passage in one of the United Kingdom's busiest maritime corridors.

== Life aboard – historical accounts ==
In earlier decades, Greenwich Lightvessel was crewed by a small complement living on board for extended periods. The crew was responsible for maintaining the light, monitoring weather, and ensuring the vessel remained operational through difficult sea conditions. Living quarters were basic, offering bunks, kitchen space, and equipment storage. Supplies were delivered by tenders, and crew changes occurred at scheduled intervals. The vessel's legacy reflects the broader maritime heritage of the UK's lightkeeping tradition.

== Current status ==
As of 2026, Greenwich Lightvessel remains operational and is an active component of Trinity House's lightvessel network. Its presence is visible on contemporary maritime navigation charts, and its position is routinely updated through marine tracking systems. The station remains essential for shipping bound to and from the Thames, reinforcing the importance of floating aids to navigation in locations unsuitable for traditional lighthouse construction.

== See also ==
- Lightvessel
- Trinity House
- Port of London
- River Thames
- Royal Museums Greenwich
