= Channel Lightvessel =

Former lightvessel station in the English Channel

Channel
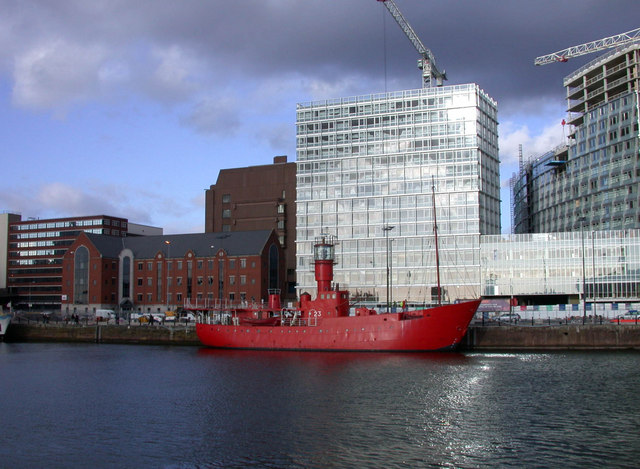
- Channel lightvessel 23 at Canning Dock

History

United Kingdom
- Operator: Trinity House
- In service: 25 November 2006
- Out of service: August 2021
- Status: Withdrawn as of August 2021

General characteristics
- Type: Lightvessel
- Channel
- Racon: O
- First lit: 1979
- Deactivated: August 2021
- Characteristic: Fl W 15s
- Channel lighted buoy
- Markings: Vertical stripe (red, white)
- Operator: Trinity House
- Racon: O
- First lit: August 2021
- Light source: LED lamp
- Range: 9 nmi (17 km; 10 mi)
- Characteristic: Fl W 10s

Channel Lightvessel was the name of a lightvessel station located in the English Channel between 1979 and August 2021, when it was replaced with a lighted buoy. It is also one of the 22 coastal weather stations whose conditions are reported in the BBC (Met Office) Shipping Forecast – the weather station is still announced as Channel Lightvessel Automatic despite being replaced by the buoy as of 2026. The vessel's position was approximately 56 km (35 mi) north-northwest of Guernsey.

The lightvessel marked the western end of the English Channel Traffic Separation Zone.

== Signals ==
The light, on a 12 m (39 ft) tower, had a range of about 15 miles, and flashed for .3 seconds every 15 seconds. The fog signal gave a single 2 second blast every 20 seconds. The agile radio beacon transmitted the letter "O" in morse code on X band and S band frequencies for nine seconds every thirty seconds.

== History ==
The Channel lightvessel was established in 1979 as part of the Off Casquets Traffic Separation Scheme (TSS), introduced following the 1978 grounding of the Amoco Cadiz. The lightvessel was intended to give clear definition to the TSS, as such schemes were at the time a new feature, rather than marking a physical hazard to navigation.

In May 2021 it was announced that the vessel would be replaced by a Type 1 buoy in August 2021. In August 2021 Trinity House stated that the replacement had been completed, with the Channel Lighted Buoy being deployed by THV Galatea. The light vessel was towed away by THV Patricia.

== Channel Light Buoy ==
The light on the buoy flashes every 10 seconds. The agile radio beacon transmits the letter "O" in morse code on X band and S band frequencies for twenty seconds every sixty seconds. The light is an LED with a range of 9 nautical miles.
