= Sandettie Bank =

Sand bank in the North Sea

Coordinates: 51°14′00″N 1°57′00″E

Sandettie Bank

The Sandettie Bank (French: Banc de Sandettié) is an elongated sandbank in the southern North Sea, more specifically about in the middle of the northeastern entrance to the Strait of Dover. North-west of it are the hazardous Goodwin Sands, south of it the sandbank Ruytingen.

The shoal represents a significant threat to the major shipping lanes in the Strait of Dover. From 1902 to 1989 it was marked by a succession of French lightships, all bearing the name Sandettié while deployed there. The last such crewed lightship is now a museum ship at the Port Museum of Dunkirk at anchor.

Today the British authority Trinity House maintains an uncrewed lightship there, the Sandettie Light Vessel Automatic which also has an automatic weather station.

== Geology ==
Tertiary strata form the basement in the Sandettie Bank. In the northwest part of the area erosion cut a basin in the Tertiary strata. This basin is filled with a sequence of late Pleistocene sands overlain by Holocene sands which form the major topographic features of the Sandettie. The surface of the banks are moulded into transverse ridges up to 10m in amplitude and 200m in wavelength. There are three types of ridges present:

1. At the north end, linear transverse ridges of irregular amplitude and wavelength occur with a flint gravel base grading up into medium sand. These ridges are fossil features of Preboreal-Subboreal age.
2. At the south end are symmetrical sandwaves of regular amplitude and wavelength which appear to be stable.
3. To the west of Sandettie Bank there are south-facing asymmetrical sandwaves which are potentially mobile and which later sedimentological investigations revealed to be moving southwards in one area.

== Downs herring ==
The area around the Sandettie Bank is the most important spawning ground of the Downs herring, a major subset of the Atlantic herring in the North Sea. During the twentieth century overfishing had threatened the fish population, and in 1958 fishing restrictions were imposed in the area.
