= Coastline of the United Kingdom =

Coastlines of Great Britain, the north-east coast of Ireland, and many smaller islands

Bedruthan Steps, North Cornwall, a spectacular section of the UK coastline, managed by the National Trust

The coastline of the United Kingdom is formed by a variety of natural features including islands, bays, headlands and peninsulas. It consists of the coastline of the island of Great Britain, the north-east coast of the island of Ireland, as well as many much smaller islands. Much of the coastline is accessible and quite varied in geography and habitats. Large stretches have been designated areas of natural beauty, notably the Jurassic Coast and various stretches referred to as heritage coast. They are both very long, spreading through the mainland.

== Characteristics ==
Video of subaqua dive survey of the Welsh seas

=== Length ===
The measurement of any coastline depends upon the scale of map used and the precision of the measurement. A larger map scale and smaller unit of measure will result in more detail being revealed and measured and thus a greater length. And because the resultant length increases exponentially faster than the increase of scale of measurement, there is no such thing as "an approximate answer" to this question. This is referred to as the coastline paradox. A coastline is fractal-like — a fractal has self-similar properties, similar at every scale — therefore the closer the observer looks, the more detail is revealed, leading to a greater overall length.

According to the CIA Factbook, the length of the UK coastline is around 12,429 km or 7,723 miles. According to the World Resources Institute, the length is around 19,717 km (12,252 mi).

=== Shape ===
The United Kingdom's coastline is more broken than coastlines of many other countries. It has a fractal or Hausdorff dimension or 'wiggliness' of 1.25, which is comparatively high; the Australian coastline for example has a fractal dimension of 1.13, and that of South Africa is 1.02.

As a result of this shape and the number of islands, the coastline of the UK is longer than that of similar sized countries. This means the UK has a relatively high coast/area ratio.

No inhabited place in the UK is more than 113 kilometres (70 mi) from the coast. It is estimated that around 3 million people (out of 60 million) live on the coast of the UK. The place furthest from the coast is Coton in the Elms in Derbyshire, which is equidistant from Fosdyke Wash in Lincolnshire; White Sands between Neston in Cheshire and Flint, Flintshire in Wales; and Westbury-on-Severn Gloucestershire.

== Features ==
=== Islands ===
There are over 1,000 islands within the UK; about 130 are permanently inhabited according to the 2001 Census. Of the remaining islands, some are used for farming and are occupied occasionally, some are nature reserves with restricted access and some are little more than sea-swept rocks. The main occupied islands and island groups in the UK are as follows:

- Great Britain
- Ireland (Northern Ireland is part of the UK)
- Anglesey
- Arran
- Barra
- Bute
- Great Bernera
- Hoy
- Islay
- Jura
- Lewis and Harris
- Mull
- Orkney
- Shetland
- Skye
- Uist
- Unst
- Isle of Wight
- Isle of Sheppey
- Yell

The Channel Islands (including Jersey, Guernsey, Alderney and Sark) and the Isle of Man are not part of the UK; they are self-governing Crown dependencies therefore their coastlines are not coastlines of the United Kingdom.

=== Peninsulas ===
Peninsulas around the UK coast include:

- Ards Peninsula
- Dengie Peninsula
- Furness
- Fife
- Black Isle
- Easter Ross
- Gower Peninsula
- Kintyre
- Llŷn Peninsula
- Penwith
- Pembrokeshire
- Rhins of Galloway
- Wirral Peninsula

=== Bays ===
Bays, sea lochs (loughs) and large estuaries include:

- Loch Fyne
- Loch Long
- Loch Linnhe
- Belfast Lough
- Bristol Channel
- Blackwater Estuary
- Cardigan Bay
- Dee Estuary
- Dyfi Estuary
- Firth of Clyde
- Firth of Forth
- Firth of Tay
- Humber Estuary
- Lough Foyle
- Luce Bay
- Lyme Bay
- Mersey Estuary
- Moray Firth
- Morecambe Bay
- Poole Harbour
- Solway Firth
- Strangford Lough
- Swansea Bay
- Thames Estuary
- The Solent
- River Tamar
- The Wash

== Recreational access ==
The coastline of the United Kingdom offers extensive recreational opportunities including seaside resorts and coastal paths:

- King Charles III England Coast Path
- Scottish Coastal Way
- Wales Coast Path

== See also ==
- Coastline of the North Sea
  - North Sea Trail
- Coastline of Wales
- Geography of the United Kingdom
  - Geography of England § Coastline
  - Geography of Scotland § Coastline
- Geography of Ireland § Coastline
- Inshore coastal areas of the United Kingdom
- List of coastal weather stations in the British Isles
- List of headlands of the United Kingdom
- List of geographical spits#United Kingdom
- List of beaches in the United Kingdom
- Sea wall (British politics)
