= Selsey Bill =

Headland in England

Coordinates: 50.722672°N 0.787992°W

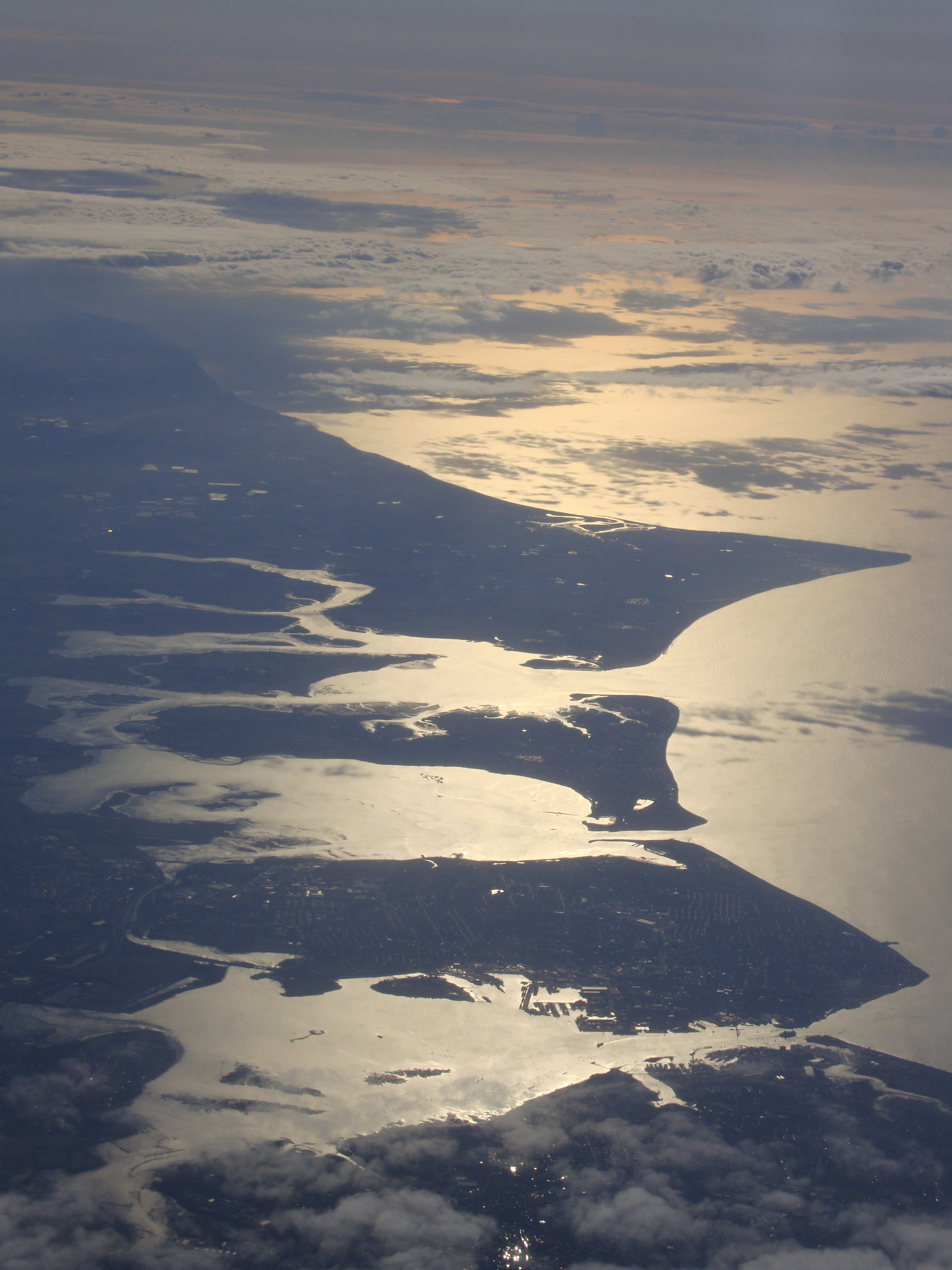
- Photograph of Selsey Bill, situated above neighbouring Hayling Island from the air, from the west (north to the left)

- Location within West Sussex
- OS grid reference: SZ8592
  - London: 60 miles (97 km) NNE
- Civil parish: Selsey
- District: Chichester
- Shire county: West Sussex
- Region: South East
- Country: England
- Sovereign state: United Kingdom
- Post town: CHICHESTER
- Postcode district: PO20
- Dialling code: 01243
- Police: Sussex
- Fire: West Sussex
- Ambulance: South East Coast
- UK Parliament: Chichester
- Website: Selsey Town Council

Selsey Bill is a headland into the English Channel on the south coast of England in the county of West Sussex.

The southernmost town in Sussex is Selsey which is at the end of the Manhood Peninsula and Selsey Bill is situated on the town's southern coastline. It is the easternmost point of Bracklesham Bay and the westernmost point of the Sussex Coast.

== Toponymy ==
Although the place name Selsey has existed since Saxon times, and is derived from the Old English meaning Seal's Island, there is no evidence to suggest that the place name Selsey Bill is particularly old. A 1698 survey of the area included in a report for the Royal Navy, by Dummer and Wiltshaw mentioned Selsey Island but not Selsey Bill.

Wee passed by Chichester observing only that there are many small Currents of Fresh Water, and breaking into the low Lands by the Flux of the Sea between it and Portsmouth in and about the Islands of Selsea and Hailing, But all Passages into the same from the Seaward being Covered by the East Burroughs the dangerous Rocks called the Oares, and the Sands of the Horse; There is no Room among them for any improvement for the Navy nor did there appear to be any Place fitting to Build a Shipp of the 4th. Rate within any of the Havens of those mentioned Islands upon the enquiry which was made thereof about 4 Years since by your own Directions.

— Dummer et al. 1698, Sheet 198

The place name does not appear to have been used before the early 18th century when it started appearing on maps; for example Philip Overton's 1740 map of Sussex and Richard Budgen's map of 1724. It is possible that the idea was taken from Portland Bill, another headland, on the western side of the Solent.

Thomas Pennant described the location of Selsey Bill, or "Selsey-bill" as he writes it in his book, "A Journey between London and the Isle of Wight" published in 1801.

The isle more properly peninsula of Selsey projects far to the south and gives protection to the vessels from the westerly winds its extremity is named Selsey-bill before it are two or three sand banks some mixed with black and called the malt owers and the sea owers the last covered with two fathoms (Note: 2 fathoms (12 ft; 3.7 m)) of water at the ebb.

— Pennant 1801, p. 104

The place name Selsey Bill has become synonymous with the town of Selsey, for example Edward Heron-Allen wrote about The Parish Church of St Peter on Selsey Bill Sussex even though the church is situated in Selsey High Street.

Popular references to Selsey Bill include the song "Saturday's Kids" by The Jam (from the 1979 album Setting Sons), along with "Bracklesham Bay": "Save up their money for a holiday/To Selsey Bill, or Bracklesham Bay," and the Madness song "Driving in My Car": "I drive up to Muswell Hill, I've even been to Selsey Bill." The references are to Selsey Bill although most of the holiday facilities are the other side of Selsey. There were Pontin's holiday camps at Selsey and Bracklesham Bay, although they are now both closed. The Pontin's at Broadreeds, Selsey, has been redeveloped, and was the only site that was near to the Bill. However both the modern Admiralty Chart and also the Ordnance Survey map of the area confirm that Selsey Bill is a headland (mostly covered by sea at high tide) whereas Selsey is part of the mainland.

== History ==
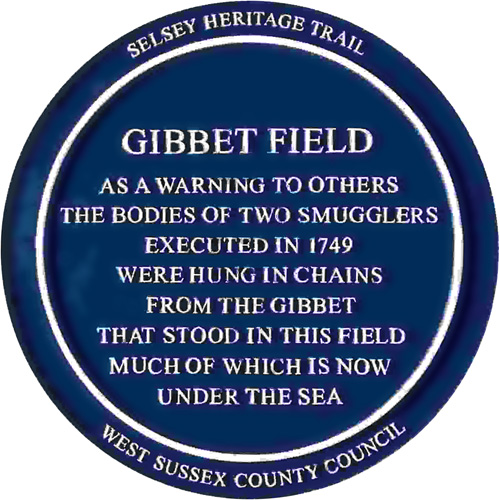
Blue plaque commemorating the hanging of two smugglers in Gibbet Field Selsey in 1749

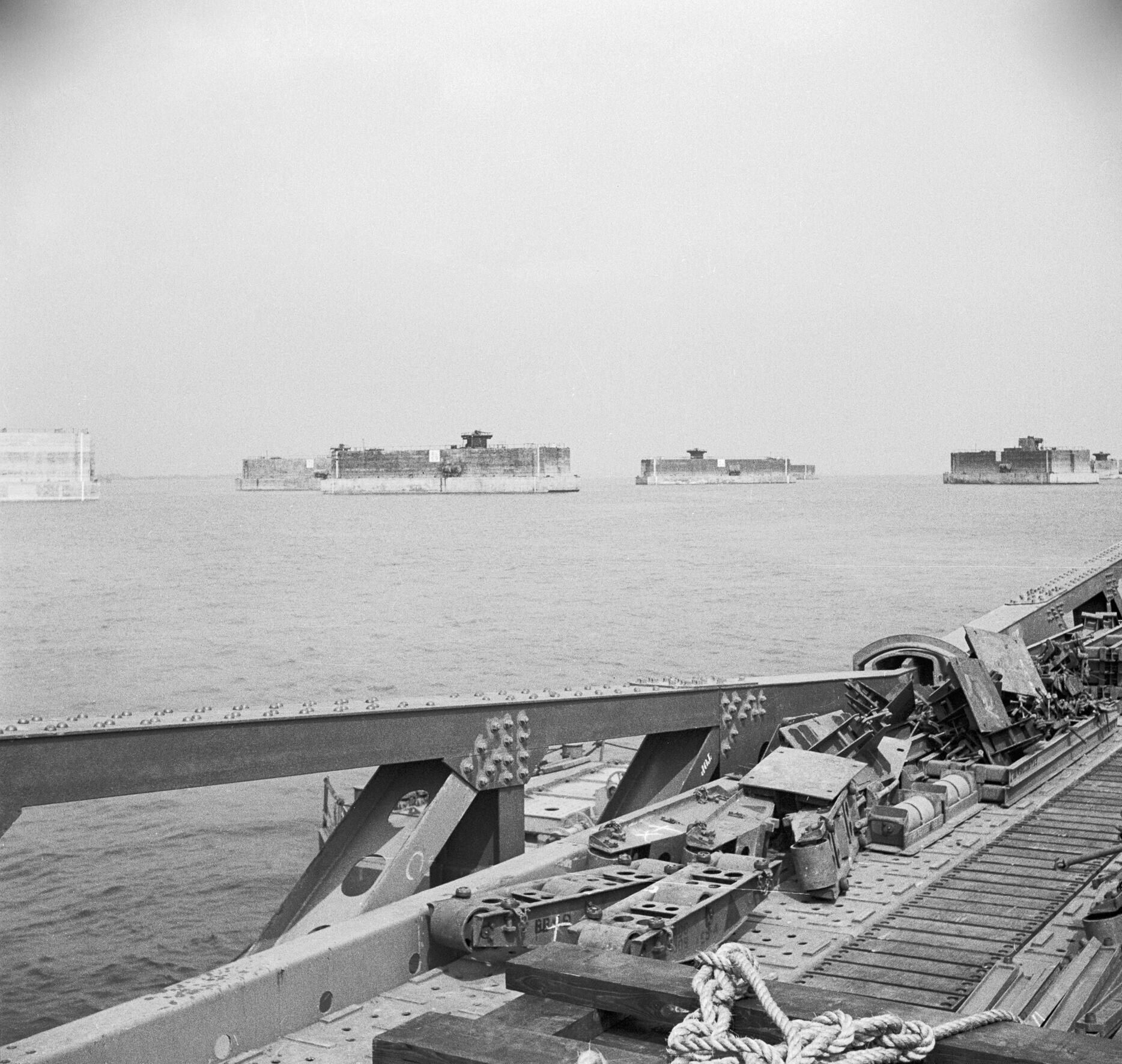
Assembly point, for Mulberry harbours, off Selsey Bill.

Although the name Selsey Bill is not particularly old, the area has been well known to sailors from the earliest times.

There have been many wrecks off Selsey Bill over the years; probably one of the first recorded was Saint Wilfrid who when appointed Archbishop of York went to Compiègne in France, to be consecrated. On his journey back home, in c.666, he was shipwrecked off Selsey Bill and was nearly killed by the heathen inhabitants.

The annals record a sea and beach battle, involving a fleet of Viking ships against those of Alfred the Great's newly founded navy. Three of the Danish vessels tried to escape, but two were grounded on, it is believed, Selsey Bill. The crews were captured and sent to Winchester where they were hanged by orders of Alfred.

And as the army which had beset Exeter again turned homeward, they spoiled they the South-Saxons near Chichester, and the townsmen put them to flight, and slew many hundreds of them, and took some of their ships.

— Giles 1914, ASC 895

Henry VI granted that lands of Chichester Cathedral should be exempt from the Court of the Admiralty in the manner of wrecks, which meant in effect that any wrecks off Selsey Bill would be the bishop's property. In the 18th century, members of a notorious smuggling gang were captured and tried for the brutal murder of a supposed informant and a customs official, Chater and Galley. Seven were condemned to death at the assizes held at Chichester in 1749 and, after they had been executed at the Broyle, Chichester, two of them were subsequently hung in chains at Selsey Bill, a Yeakel and Gardner map has a Gibbet Field marked on it where it is believed the smugglers hung.

Since 1861, there have been lifeboat stations to the east of Selsey Bill, and also a system of beacons that warns sailors of the treacherous Owers and Mixon rocks (Note: Mixon rock consists of foraminifera-rich, calcareous sandstone.) that are south of Selsey Bill.The Mixon rock was formerly quarried, initially during the Roman occupation and then was to become an important building stone in the late Saxon period. Its quarrying continued after the Norman conquest and was still being used until the early 19th century. The quarrying finally ceased after an Admiralty prohibition order in 1827.

In 1926 the Southern Railway Company named one of their steam locomotives "Selsey Bill". The locomotive had been inherited from its predecessor, the London, Brighton and South Coast Railway(LB&SCR). It was designed by the engineer D. E. Marsh in 1905 and its original identifier was H1 No 37 4-4-2. (Note: Later SR. B37, SR.2037 and BR.32037) The locomotive was eventually scrapped by British Railways in the 1950s.

In 1944, during World War II, components for the Mulberry harbours were built at many different locations in Britain and transferred to assembly points on the south coast, before being towed to France. There was an assembly point near Selsey Bill.

== Seaside ==
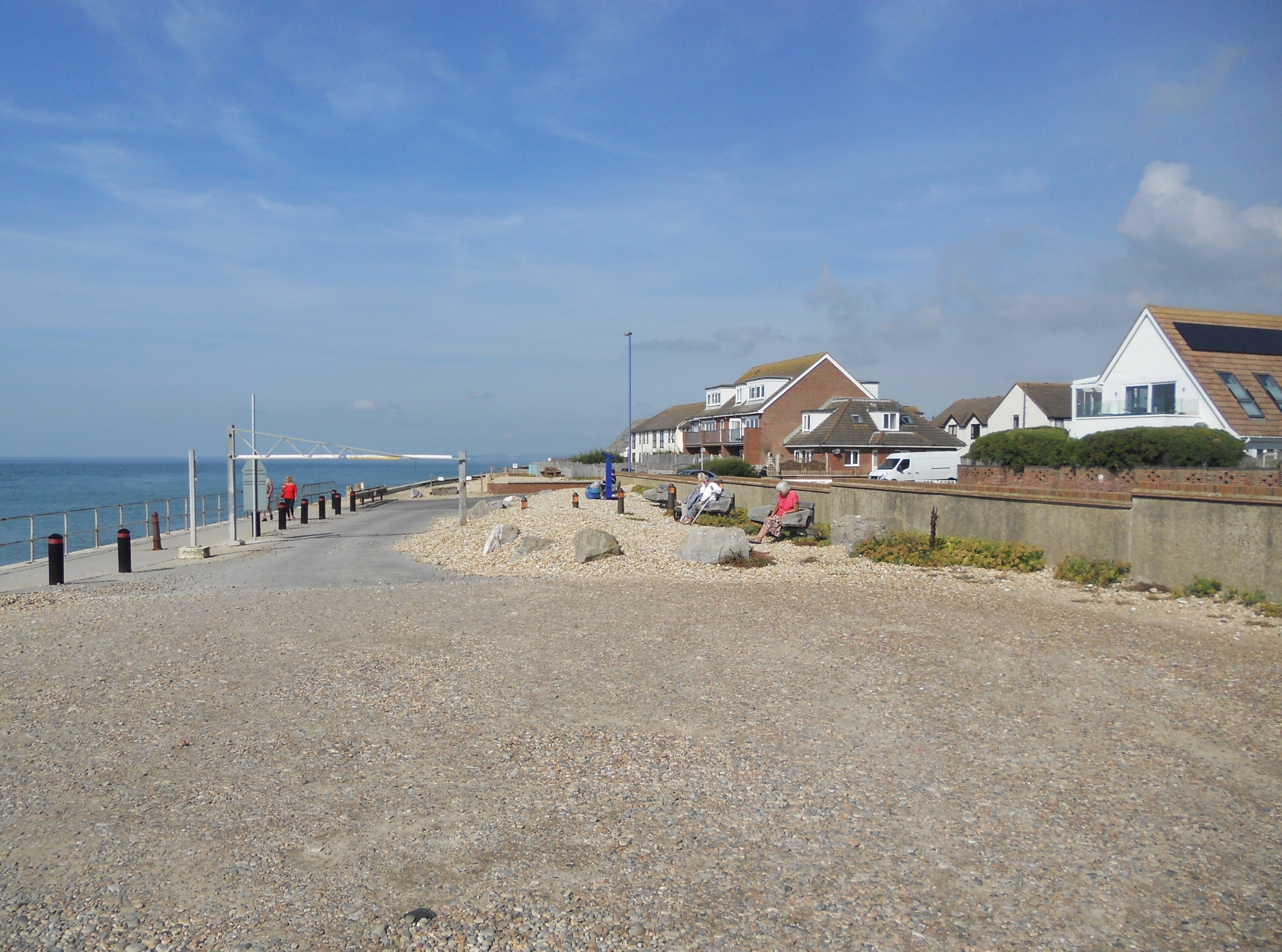
Seafront near Selsey Bill

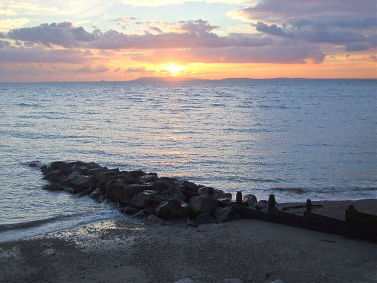
Sunset over the Isle of Wight seen from Selsey Bill

The Meteorological Office (Met Office) issues Shipping Forecasts and they are read out on BBC Radio 4, four times a day. It gives a summary of gale warnings in force, a general synopsis and area forecasts for specified sea areas around the UK. In addition, some bulletins include a forecast for all UK inshore waters, as distinct from the coastal waters. Selsey Bill is a boundary for two areas of the Met Office's inshore water forecast. The area to the west extends to Lyme Regis and to the East to North Foreland. Selsey Bill is in sea area Wight.

In the 19th and early 20th century the local fishermen jointly owned a longboat, operated by 22 oarsmen. If any vessel was stranded off the Bill, after any rescue work had been completed, the pilot of the longboat would then negotiate with the skipper of the damaged vessel a price to assist them to safe harbour. In modern times the "Channel Pilot for the South Coast of England and the North Coast of France" cautions sailors that Selsey Bill is difficult to locate in poor visibility. However, in clear weather, when the wind is moderate, a shortcut can be afforded by using the Looe Channel that passes through the rocks and ledges south of the Bill, which is marked by buoys. The pilot requires a large-scale chart, and proceeding with caution is recommended.

== Marine Conservation Zone ==
The sea area around Selsey Bill was designated the "Selsey Bill and Hounds" Marine Conservation Zone(MCZ) in 2019. Marine Conservation Zones are a type of marine nature reserve established under the Marine and Coastal Access Act (2009) with the aim of protecting nationally important, rare or threatened habitats and species.

== Dolphin Head Highly Protected Marine Area ==
The area known as Dolphin Head, which is 55 km offshore from Selsey Bill was designated a Highly Protected Marine Area in July 2023.

== Maps ==
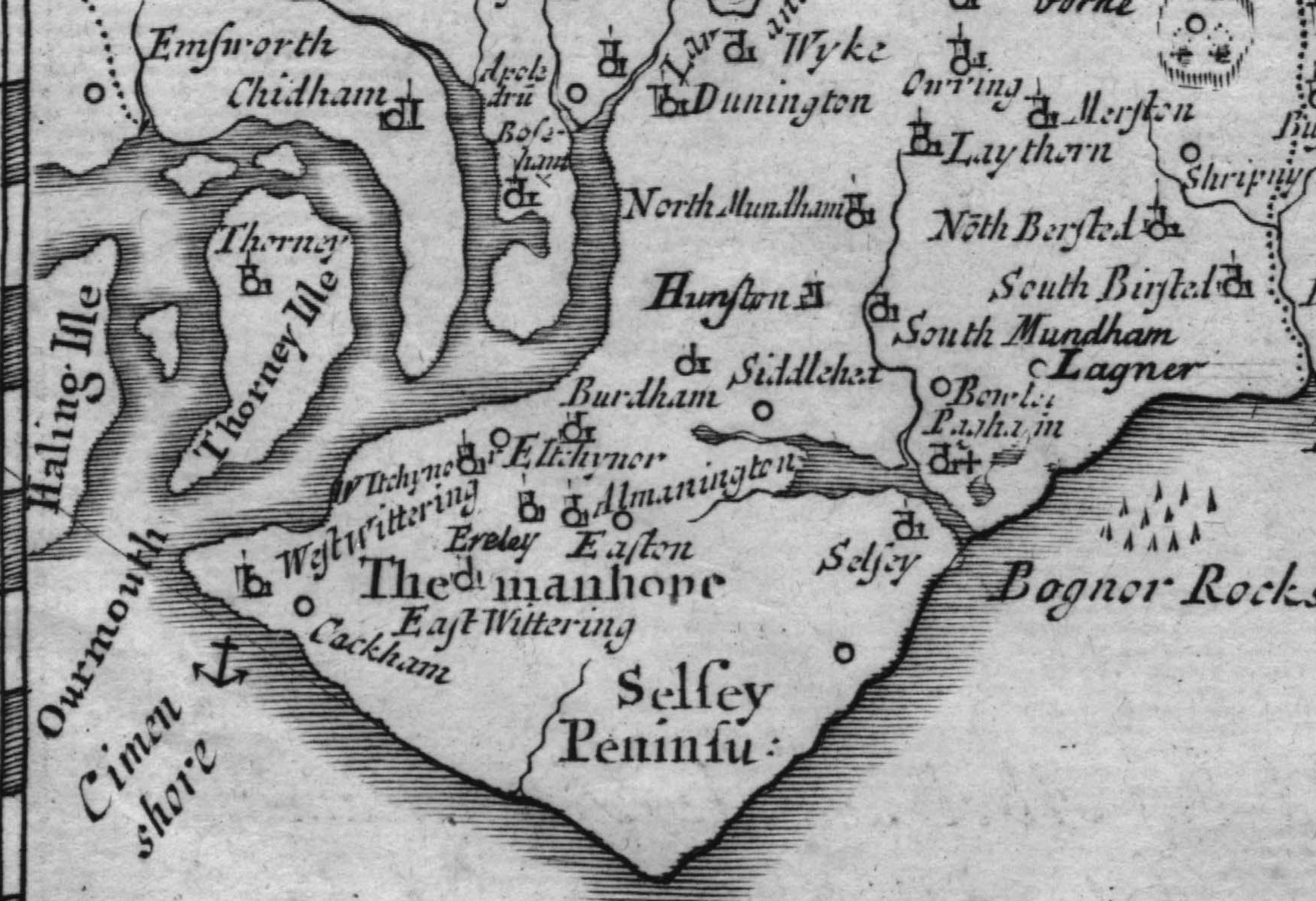
Section of Robert Mordens map of Sussex from 1695 with the Manhood Peninsula, shown as The manhope

Part of Kitchens 1756 map of Sussex showing Selsey Bill

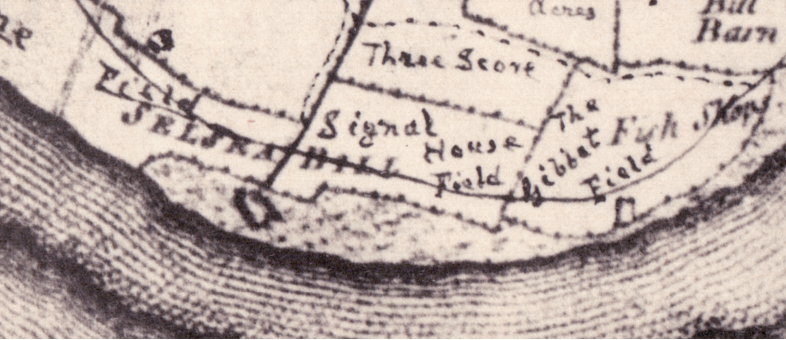
Part of 1778 map of Selsey annotated by Cavis-Brown in 1906, showing Gibbet Field near Selsey Bill. (Selsea Bill on map). The line going left to right through the name Selsea Bill was the coast line in 1906.

"The Selsey Bill and Hounds" Marine Conservation Zone

Maps of Selsey Bill

== See also ==
- Hawkhurst Gang
