= Sandettie Lightvessel =

British lightship in the North Sea

Sandettie
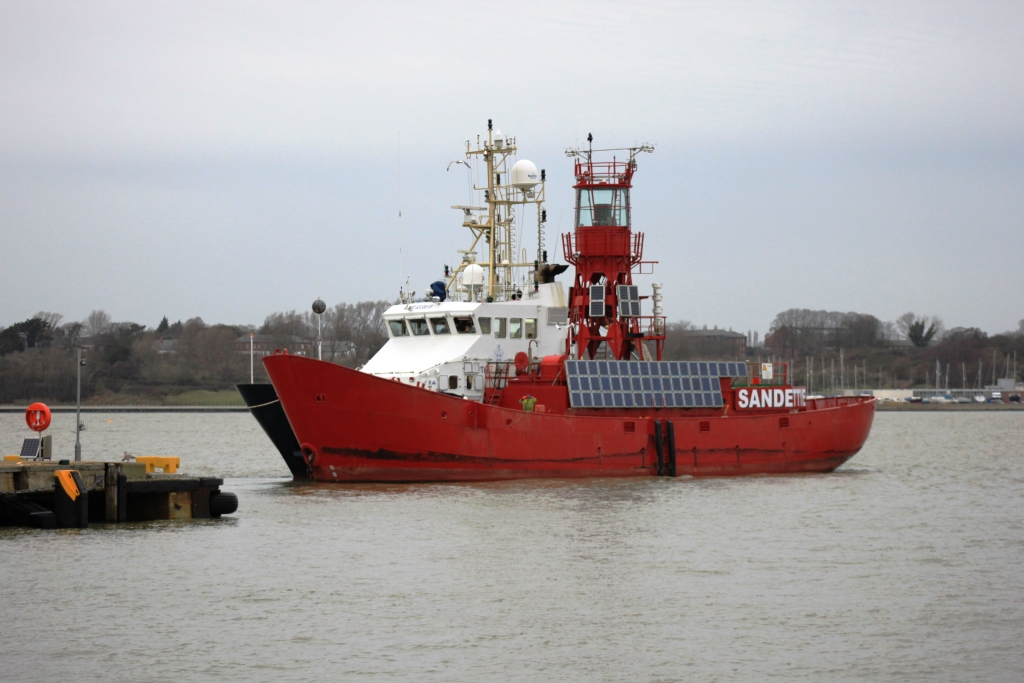
- LV Sandettie being moved by MV Alert

History

United Kingdom
- Namesake: Sandettie Bank
- Operator: Trinity House
- Builder: Forges et Chantiers de la Méditerranée (1947–1948)
- Launched: 1949
- Out of service: 1989 (previous vessel)
- Identification: MMSI number: 992351029
- Fate: Museum ship (previous vessel)

General characteristics
- Type: Lightvessel
- Displacement: 450 tons
- Length: 47.5 m (156 ft)
- Beam: 7.65 m (25.1 ft)
- Draft: 3.5 m (11 ft)
- Speed: 6 knots (11 km/h; 6.9 mph)

Sandettie
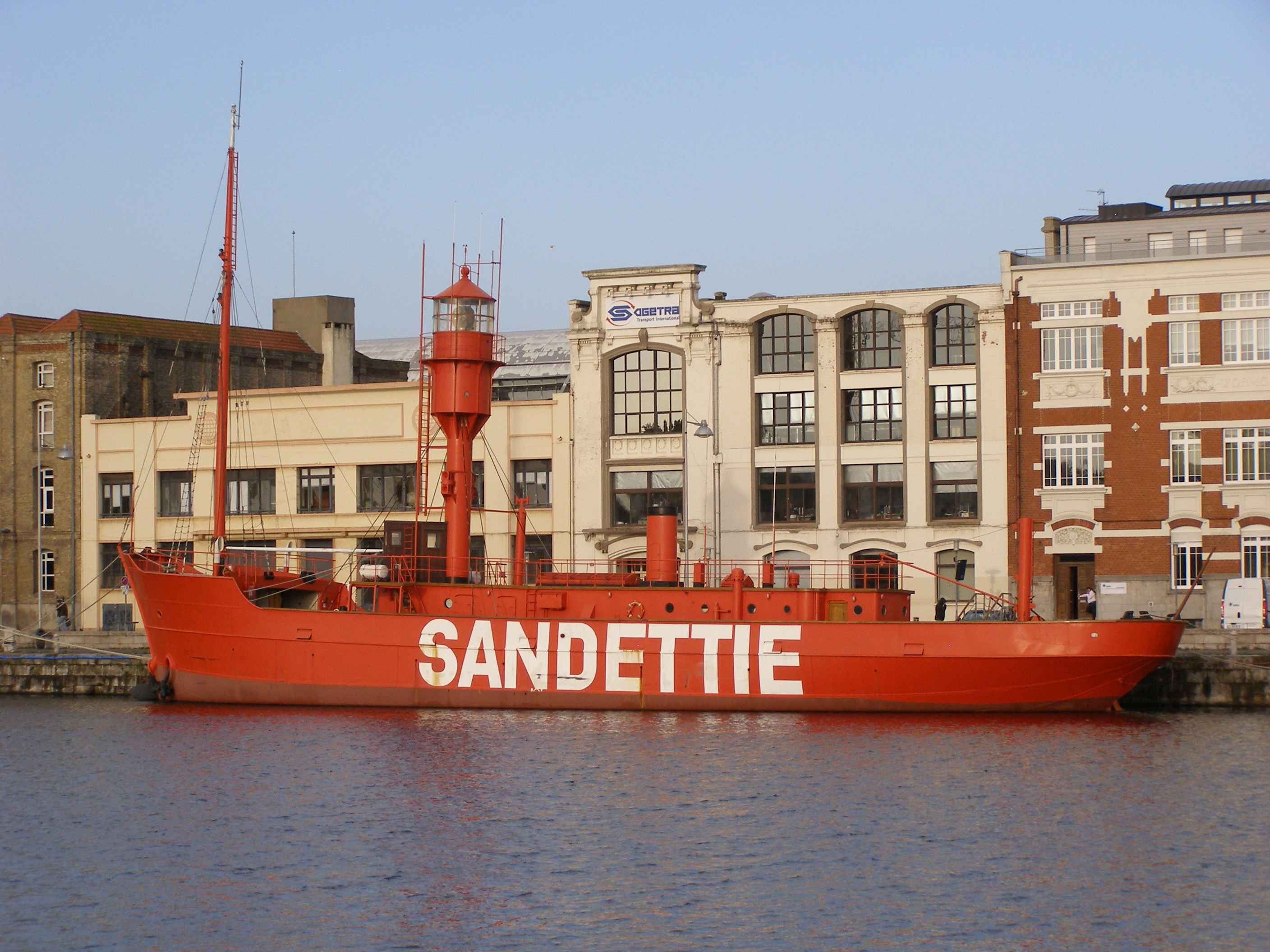
- Location: Sandettie Bank
- Coordinates: 51°09′21″N 1°47′07″E
- Operator: Trinity House
- Fog signal: 1 blast of 3 seconds every 30 seconds
- Racon: T

Light
- First lit: 1989
- Focal height: 12 m (39 ft)
- Range: 15 nmi (28 km; 17 mi)
- Characteristic: Fl W 5s

Sandettie is a lightvessel station located at Sandettie Bank in the North Sea. It is one of the 22 coastal weather stations whose conditions are reported in the BBC Shipping Forecast. The vessel is named after her location on the Sandettie Bank, due north of Calais and due east of the South Foreland. The ship has no engine and is not crewed. Its lights are powered by solar panels.

The previous Sandettie lightship was taken out of service in 1989 and is now a museum ship moored in Dunkirk harbour museum (fr). In 2019 Simon Armitage published a collection of poems named Sandettie Light Vessel Automatic after the lightvessel's weather station.

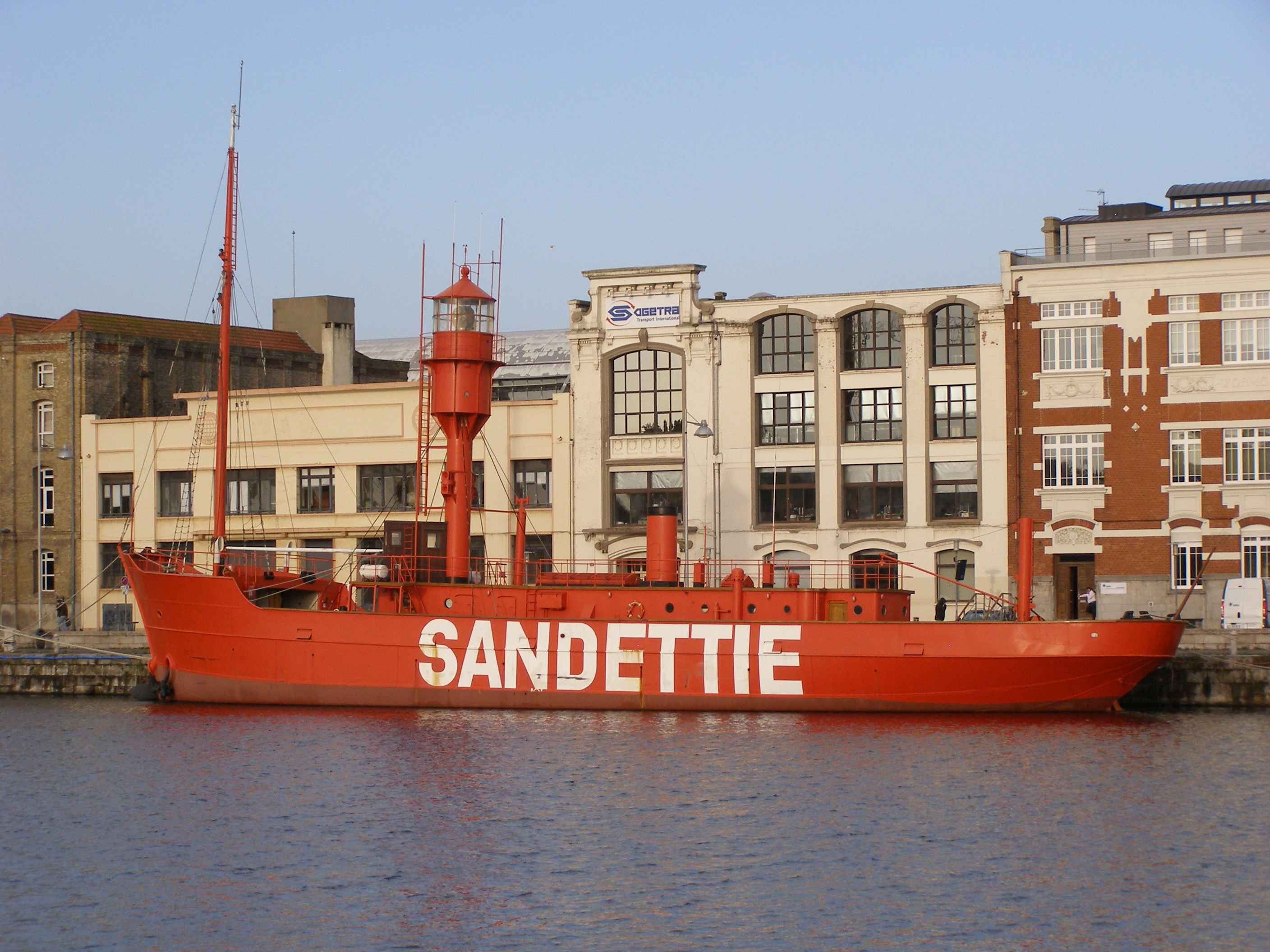
The previous Sandettie light ship in Dunkerque harbour

== Related articles ==
- fr:Sandettié (bateau-feu) — Article (more detailed than this one) about the lightship in the French Wikipedia
