= Viking-Bergen Banks =

Underwater hills in the North Sea

Viking Bank

The Viking-Bergen Banks are underwater hills in the North Sea, east of Shetland and west of Norway.

== Banks ==
When sea levels were lower during the Last Glacial Period, the hills formed an island that may have been occupied by humans.

A map showing Viking-Bergen island to the north of Doggerland 10,000 BCE

From approximately 15,500 to 13,600 years before present (BP), sea levels in the region were lower by 100 to 110 metres (330 to 360 ft), and possibly more than 140 metres (460 ft). At this time, Viking-Bergen would have been an island surrounded by a shallow sea. If sea levels reached the lowest projected level, the formation may have existed for some time as hills at the northernmost extent of Doggerland; these hills would have been east of the Shetland hills, now the Shetland islands. Viking-Bergen may have been occupied during the Bølling–Allerød warming based on a hypothetical piece of worked flint found near the banks. The island was inundated by the North Sea by about 12,000 years BP although it's possible that Viking-Bergen remained an island into the early Holocene.
