= Lift Off with Ayshea =

British children's TV series (1969–1974)

- Also known as: Lift Off
- Genre: Music, children
- Created by: Muriel Young
- Directed by: Dave Warwick; Baz Taylor
- Presented by: Ayshea; Wally Whyton; Ollie Beak; Fred Barker; Graham Bonney
- Theme music composer: Roy Wood
- Country of origin: United Kingdom
- Original language: English
- No. of series: 8
- No. of episodes: 122

Production
- Producer: Muriel Young
- Running time: 25 minutes
- Production company: Granada

Original release
- Network: ITV
- Release: 5 November 1969

Related
- Shang-A-Lang, Get It Together

Lift Off with Ayshea is a British TV show, produced by Granada Television for the ITV network, and starring Ayshea, which ran for 122 editions spanning eight series, between November 1969 and December 1974.

Preceded by the show Discotheque which had been hosted by Dianne Greaves, the replacement was originally entitled Lift Off and was aired in the children's programming schedule, but was seen by many as ITV's junior answer to the BBC's Top of the Pops. Ayshea (formally Ayshea Brough) had appeared on the earlier Discotheque in March 1969 and was one of the first women of Asian heritage to present a British television series, initially co-hosting the show with Graham Bonney and later singer Wally Whyton. The series was produced by Muriel Young, who also produced Clapperboard, Shang-A-Lang and Get It Together for ITV Granada.

The premise of the show was to showcase music requested by viewers writing in to the series. The requests were interspersed with performances of either new releases or current hits. Generally, only two or three guest acts would appear each week; the majority of the songs were performed by Ayshea herself or would be played into the studio and a dance troupe would choreograph the track. The main dance ensemble were known as The Feet; identical twin sisters Teresa and Lesley Scoble, who were concurrently appearing in the ITV children's drama Timeslip throughout the 1970 run. For one series, a resident band known as The Pattern sang selected tracks each week. Series 5 featured Guy Lutman, Lynn Garner and Chris Marlow as the resident singers. Later series featured the puppets Ollie Beak and Fred Barker as co-hosts.

During the series' run, Ayshea contributed a column to the children's magazines Look-in and Disco 45. She also teamed up with Roy Wood to record his composition Farewell, which was released as a single and used as the show's theme tune. Wood's band Wizzard often appeared on the series and Brough appeared on Top of the Pops, backing Wizzard on several occasions. When performing with Wizzard, Wood often sported a white star with the initial 'A' in the centre of his forehead, while Brough wore the same make-up featuring an 'R'. This led to some media speculation that the two were involved in an unconfirmed relationship, with many reports claiming they were engaged. Although the track failed to chart, Ayshea performed the song on Top of the Pops on BBC1.

Of the 122 episodes made, only three are confirmed as having survived in the ITV archives. All other episodes were accidentally destroyed when they were sent to be digitized. In January 2019, it was announced that a fan's home recording of David Bowie's 1972 Lift Off appearance had been discovered. That episode marked the first-ever appearance of Bowie's "Ziggy Stardust" persona, and was broadcast one month before his memorable Top of the Pops performance as Ziggy.

Lift Off was replaced by a similar format series Shang-A-Lang, hosted by The Bay City Rollers, which in turn was replaced by Get It Together hosted by Roy North, Linda Fletcher and later Megg Nichol. All three series were produced by Muriel Young.

== Series ==
Series 1: 5 November 1969 – 28 January 1970. 13 episodes.
Directors: Dave Warwick & Baz Taylor.
Guests included: Long John Baldry, Lou Christie and Millie Small.

Series 2: 7 October 1970 – 30 December 1970. 13 episodes.
Directors: Dave Warwick & Baz Taylor.
Guests included: The Tremeloes, Mike d'Abo, Roger Whitaker, Julie Felix, Black Sabbath, Pickettywitch, Dana, Labi Siffre, Ken Dodd, The New Seekers, The Sweet & Herman's Hermits.

Series 3A & 3B: 10 August – 7 September 1971 & 13 October 1971 – 5 January 1972. 20 episodes.
Directors: Dave Warwick & Baz Taylor.
Guests included: The Sweet, Ken Dodd, The Tremeloes, The Move, The Marmalade, The New Seekers, Tony Blackburn, Vanity Fare, Cliff Richard, Olivia Newton-John, Gene Pitney, Tony Christie, Charlie Drake & Gilbert O'Sullivan.

Series 4: (Renamed: Lift Off with Ayshea). 12 April 1972 – 5 July 1972. 13 episodes.
Directors: Dave Warwick & Baz Taylor.
Guests included: Colin Blunstone, The Move, Roy Wood, Gene Pitney, Jack Wild, The Bay City Rollers, Peter Noone, The Barron Knights, David Bowie & Slade.

Series 5: 11 October 1972 – 3 January 1973. 14 episodes.
Directors: Dave Warwick & Baz Taylor.
Guests included: 10cc, Lonnie Donegan, The Fortunes, Middle of the Road, Slade, The Sweet & Lieutenant Pigeon.

Series 6: 27 April 1973 – 29 June 1973. 10 episodes.
Directors: Dave Warwick & Baz Taylor.
Guests included: Wizzard, Roger Whitaker, 10cc, Gene Pitney, Vanity Fare & Wayne Fontana.

Series 7: 17 October 1973 – 9 January 1974. 13 episodes.
Directors: Dave Warwick & Baz Taylor.
Guests included Gary Glitter and Lynsey de Paul (14 November) and T.Rex, Hector, (19 December).

Series 8: 1 July 1974 – 17 December 1974. 25 episodes.
Directors: Dave Warwick & Baz Taylor.
Guests included: Slade, The Flirtations, The Scaffold, The Settlers, Mud, Paper Lace, The Glitter Band, Alvin Stardust, The Wombles, Stephanie de Sykes, Showaddywaddy, Limmie & the Family Cooking, Suzi Quatro, Kiki Dee, Hector, Polly Brown, David Essex & Barry Blue.
