= Jean Van den Bosch =

British singer and guitarist (1933–2022)

Jean Van den Bosch (1933–2022) was a British guitarist and vocalist, was one of the original three members of The Vipers Skiffle Group (founded in 1956) along with Wally Whyton and Johnny Martyn. They were later joined by Tony Tolhurst on bass and John Pilgrim on percussion and washboard. Van den Bosch was born in 1933. Originally a wire salesman before he joined, Van den Bosch left the group in 1958. He was described by fellow Viper, John Pilgrim, as having a "deep baritone voice and percussive guitar style" Van Den Bosch died in London in 2022.

== Sources ==
- 45-rpm.org.uk, Vipers
- All Media Guide, "The Vipers Skiffle Group", Popular Artist Biographies. Answers.com 10 December 2009.
- MSN Music, The Vipers
- Pilgrim, John, Johnny Booker: Lead singer with the Vipers, The Independent, 26 March 2007
