= Tuesday Rendezvous =

UK television series

Tuesday Rendezvous is a British children's television show which was transmitted on Tuesdays and Fridays. It was made by Associated-Rediffusion for ITV.

== History ==
Howard Williams (replaced by Wally Whyton), Muriel Young and Bert Weedon (the famous guitarist) presented the show between 1961 and 1963, assisted by glove puppets Pussy Cat Willum (devised and animated by Janet Nicholls) and Fred Barker (created by Wally Whyton of skiffle band, The Vipers). Tuesday Rendezvous evolved from Small Time (1955) and Lucky Dip (1958) and eventually evolved into The Five O'Clock Club in 1963 - by which time another puppet had joined the show - this time a Liverpudlian owl, called Ollie Beak. The show provided The Beatles with their first London TV appearance. On 4 December 1962 the group appeared on the show miming to "Love Me Do" and "P.S. I Love You". They appeared on the show again in April 1963 - This time miming to "From Me To You" and "Please Please Me".

== Cast ==
- Howard Williams
- Wally Whyton
- Muriel Young
- Bert Weedon
- Pussy Cat Willum
- puppet Ollie Beak
- puppet Fred Barker
- The Echoes
