= Get It Together (British TV series) =

British children's TV series (1977–1981)

- Genre: Music, Children's television
- Created by: Muriel Young
- Directed by: Dave Warwick; Nicholas Ferguson; Eugene Ferguson
- Starring: Roy North; Linda Fletcher; Megg Nichol 'Ollie Beak'; Mike Moran
- Country of origin: United Kingdom
- Original language: English
- No. of series: 7
- No. of episodes: 87

Production
- Producer: Muriel Young
- Production locations: Granada Studios, Manchester, England, UK
- Running time: 25 minutes
- Production company: Granada Television

Original release
- Network: ITV
- Release: 6 April 1977 – 22 December 1981

Related
- Lift Off with Ayshea; Shang-A-Lang

Get It Together is a British children's television series, produced by Granada Television for the UK ITV network between 6 April 1977 and 22 December 1981. The series followed an almost identical format to the earlier Lift Off with Ayshea, also created by series producer Muriel Young.

The series was presented by former 'straight man' to Basil Brush, Roy North, initially with Linda Fletcher, who won New Faces on 27th November, 1976 with 111 points, making her the 3rd highest female singer scorer over the entire New Faces series. When Linda decided to leave the programme after series 5, Megg Nicol and Ollie Beak took over for series 6 & 7. Megg made her debut presenting with Mike Read, in Yorkshire TV's Pop Quest. Whereas Lift Off had been originally designed to showcase viewer's pop music requests by guest artists, Get It Together relied more on the presenters and resident band and singers. Mike Moran was the show's musical director, leading the studio band on camera, with singers including Val Stokes, Lynn Garner, Victy Silva and Kim Goody.

According to the BFI database, the first show was televised on 6 April 1977 and the last on 22 December 1981. It is possible that the first transmission was in fact earlier. One of the first guests on the series were that year's British representatives in the Eurovision Song Contest Lynsey de Paul & Mike Moran, but that episode is not listed in the BFI credits.

According to BFI, Series 1 ran from 6 April – 6 July 1977, consisting of 13 episodes. The show then returned later that year for a Christmas special on 27 December, entitled Get It Together with The Bay City Rollers.

Series 2 ran from 10 January – 21 March 1978, featuring 12 shows.

Series 3 ran from 19 September – 19 December 1978, followed by a Christmas Special on 26 December, for a total of 15 shows.

Series 4 ran from 10 April – 15 May 1979, for just 6 episodes.

Series 5 ran from 27 November 1979 – 6 March 1980, including the Get It Together Christmas Bonanza on 26 December 1979, for a run of 13 shows.

Series 6 ran from 23 September – 23 December 1980, featuring 14 shows, with Megg Nicol replacing Linda Fletcher as co-presenter to North.

The final series 7, ran from 1 September – 22 December 1981, featuring 17 shows.

Guests that featured throughout the series run included: the Bay City Rollers, Squeeze, U2, Sally Oldfield, Chas & Dave, Showaddywaddy, Berni Flint, The Glitter Band, Billy Ocean, Shakin' Stevens, T.Rex, Sad Café, Mink DeVille, Steve Gibbons Band, Eddie and the Hot Rods, Strawbs, The Real Thing, Lynsey de Paul & Rocky Sharpe and the Replays, Slade and The Vapors.
