= Muriel Young =

English TV announcer, presenter and producer (1923–2001)

- Born: Muriel Young; 19 June 1923; Bishop Middleham, County Durham, England
- Died: 24 March 2001 (aged 77); Stanhope, County Durham, England
- Occupations: Television announcer Presenter; Producer
- Years active: 1955–86

Muriel Young (19 June 1923 – 24 March 2001) was an English television continuity announcer, presenter, producer and actress.

== Early life ==
Young was born in 1923 in Bishop Middleham near Sedgefield, County Durham. She had a sister. As a child, she lived with her family in the gatehouse of Elmwood (now the Elmwood Community Centre), Hartburn, County Durham near Stockton-on-Tees. Her father, Wilfrid Young, was batman and later chauffeur to Col Kitching, who lived at Elmwood for many years after retiring from the army in 1939. She attended a girls school in North Yorkshire.

== Early career ==
Young worked briefly as a librarian on leaving school and attended art college, before deciding to embark on a career as an actress. She joined a repertory theatre in Henley-on-Thames, where her uncle was directing. She subsequently performed at the Gateway Theatre, London, and the Theatre Royal in Chatham. Trying to get into the film industry, she did modelling for advertising agencies, including promoting products such as toothpaste, which paid her enough money until she became an actress. She also studied to be a dental nurse and used her artistic talents to paint glassware.

=== Films ===
Starting out as an actress, she starred with Rex Harrison and Kay Kendall in The Constant Husband (1955);The Story of Gilbert and Sullivan (1953), (acting in a segment featuring The Mikado); and I'm All Right Jack (1959) as an announcer, without the director knowing that it was in fact her real-life job.

== Television ==
In 1955, as the first ITV company Associated-Rediffusion was gearing up to launch, she intended to attend an actors' audition at the company, but mistakenly went to an announcers' audition instead. Nevertheless, Young was instantly hired and announced for Associated-Rediffusion on 22 September 1955, the opening night of commercial television in the UK. Young worked as a presenter and interviewer for regional programmes on Granada Television and Southern Television, and as a disc jockey on Radio Luxembourg. She starred as Fortune Teller, Madam Rose, in 'Inside Job', (episode 33 of Dial 999 (TV series)). Just before joining ITV, she had been on stage touring with Eamonn Andrews, in a game show called Double or Drop. Shortly after signing her ITV contract, he told her that he had sold the idea to the BBC. It was later used as part of the children's show Crackerjack!.

She was a presenter of children's programmes for Associated-Rediffusion and Rediffusion London between 1959 and 1968, working alongside Wally Whyton and Bert Weedon and featuring the puppet characters Pussy Cat Willum, Ollie Beak and Fred Barker. The format created lasted for many years under titles including Lucky Dip, Tuesday Rendezvous, Five O'Clock Club, Ollie and Fred's Five O'Clock Club and Five O'Clock Funfair. In September 1968, Young became a staff senior producer of children's popular programmes for Granada Television in Manchester, with such shows as Lift Off with Ayshea, Get It Together, the Bay City Rollers series Shang-a-Lang, The Arrows Show and Marc, starring Marc Bolan..

In 1979, Muriel Young produced a children's television programme titled Learning Tree for Granada Television. The series generated a number of accompanying books based on its stories, as well as a songbook and a vinyl recording of the programme's songs. On the rear cover of the vinyl, Young included a dedication reading: “Since Ian Page has presented LEARNING TREE to Granada TV, the old boy has become the dearly loved mentor of thousands of small children. Picking up litter, protecting plants and animals, watching the changing seasons has become part of their lives and with these songs to remind them, the children have learned lessons which will not only last their lifetime, but will help keep our environment fresh and flourishing for their own little ones — well done LEARNING TREE! (and its marvellous Ian Page) - MURIEL YOUNG.”

She devised Clapperboard, presented by Chris Kelly, Granada's film magazine show for children. Young was also an occasional panellist on the ATV talent show New Faces. Changing direction again in the mid-1980s, Young made two series of Ladybirds, a Channel 4 programme from Mike Mansfield's independent company.

== Personal life ==
In 1986, Young left her successful career in television and moved back to County Durham, where she lived in part of Stanhope Castle with her husband Cyril Coke, a television drama director, whom she had married in 1954. Coke was the son of the film actor Edward Rigby and the novelist Phyllis Austin. The couple met when he was casting director for The Story of Gilbert and Sullivan. Coke died in 1993.

Although most references gave her year of birth as 1928, she was actually born on 19 June 1923; her parents' marriage was registered in the first quarter of 1923.

She died in Stanhope, County Durham on 24 March 2001, aged 77.
