= Graham Bonney =

British pop singer and songwriter

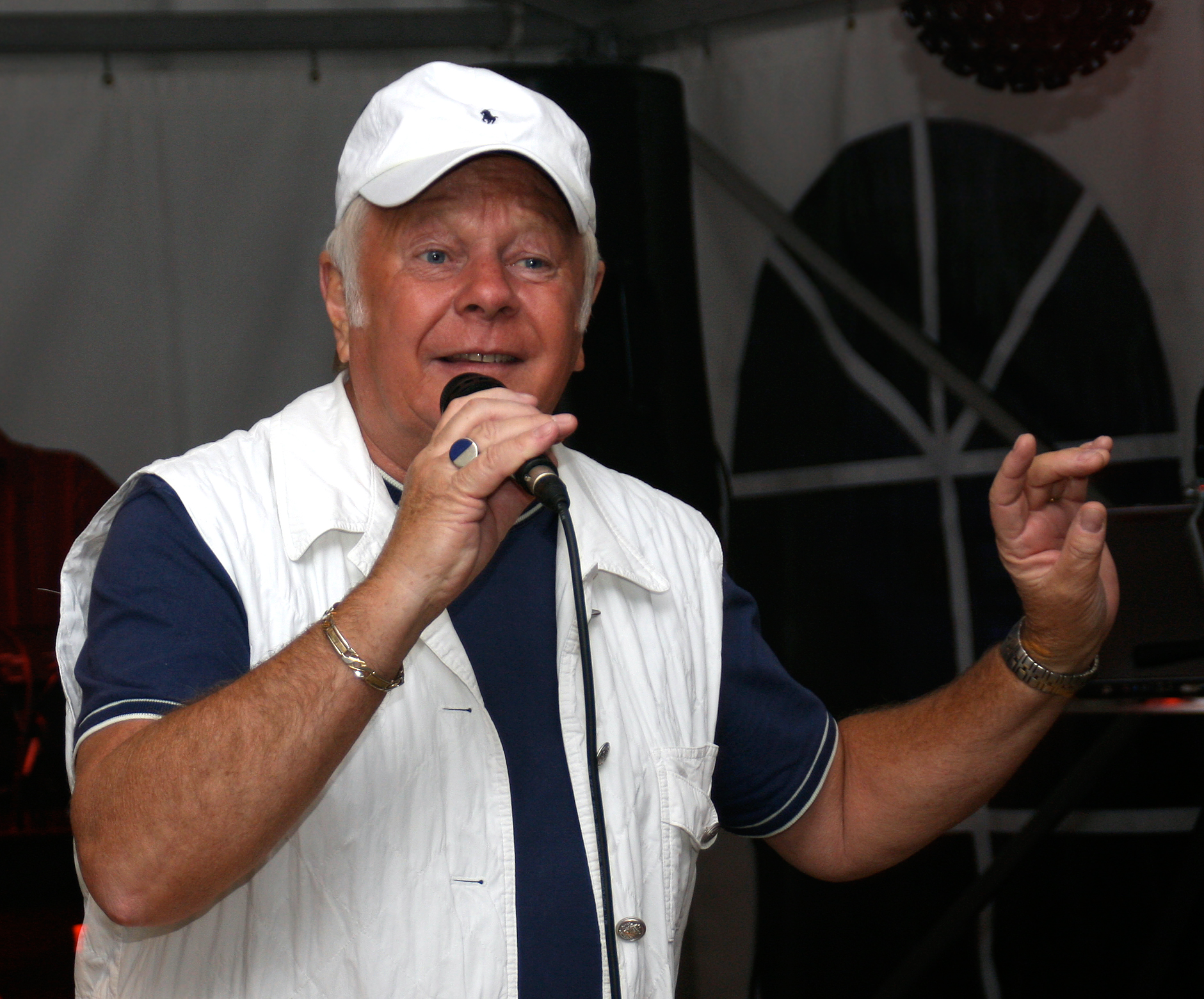
- Graham Bonney performing in 2009

Background information
- Born: Graham Arthur Ernest George Bradly; 2 June 1943 (age 83); Basildon, Essex, England
- Genres: Pop
- Occupation: Singer
- Years active: 1961–
- Labels: Columbia, Polydor, Bellaphon,
- Website: graham-bonney.de

Graham Bonney (born Graham Arthur Ernest George Bradly, 2 June 1943) is a British pop singer and songwriter who has mainly lived and worked in Germany. Although he only had one UK chart hit, "Super Girl" in 1966, his success has continued in Europe.

== Life and career ==
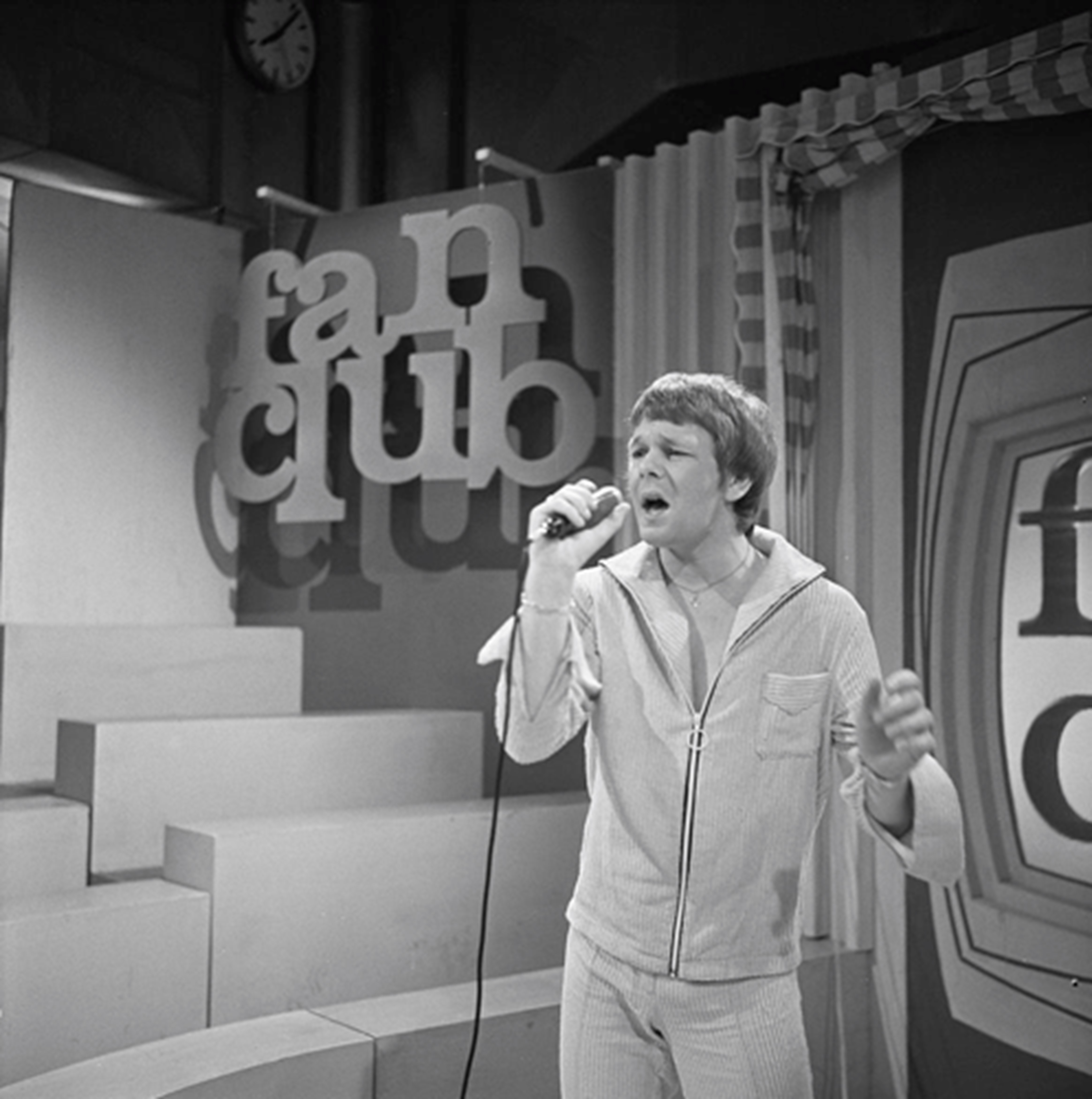
Graham Bonney performing on the Dutch TV programme Fanclub on 27 May 1967

He was born in Basildon, Essex, and worked as a child actor before forming his first group when at school. In 1961, he joined the Espresso Five, followed in 1962 by The Ambers, with whom he performed at the Star-Club in Hamburg. In 1964 he became lead singer with The Riot Squad, a band put together by manager Larry Page.

After three unsuccessful singles for Pye Records in 1965, Bonney left the band for a solo career. He started writing songs with Barry Mason, and his second solo single "Super Girl", issued on the Columbia label, reached no. 19 on the UK Singles Chart in 1966. It proved more popular in Europe, reaching number 1 on some German charts and remaining in the top 10 there for several months, reportedly selling over 1 million copies.

Follow-up records in Britain were less successful, but Bonney established a lasting career in Germany, where 14 of his singles reached the top fifty between 1966 and 1973. His German hits included "Das Girl mit dem La-La-La", "Wähle 333", "Du bist viel zu schön", and "Brandy". He won Bravo Otto awards as top singer in 1967 and 1968. He appeared on German television as a regular of the TV programme Beat Club, toured with The Beach Boys and others, and had his own TV show, Hits a Go Go. He returned to Britain in 1969 to co-host early editions of the TV show Lift Off with Ayshea.

He continued to be a popular entertainer in Germany through the 1970s and 1980s, his British citizenship allowing him to perform in East as well as West Germany. He also made TV appearances in the Netherlands, Belgium, Austria, Switzerland, Italy and Spain, and has continued to perform and release records in Germany.

He married a Lufthansa stewardess in 1984 and lives near Cologne.
