= Allan Warren =

English photographer (born 1948)

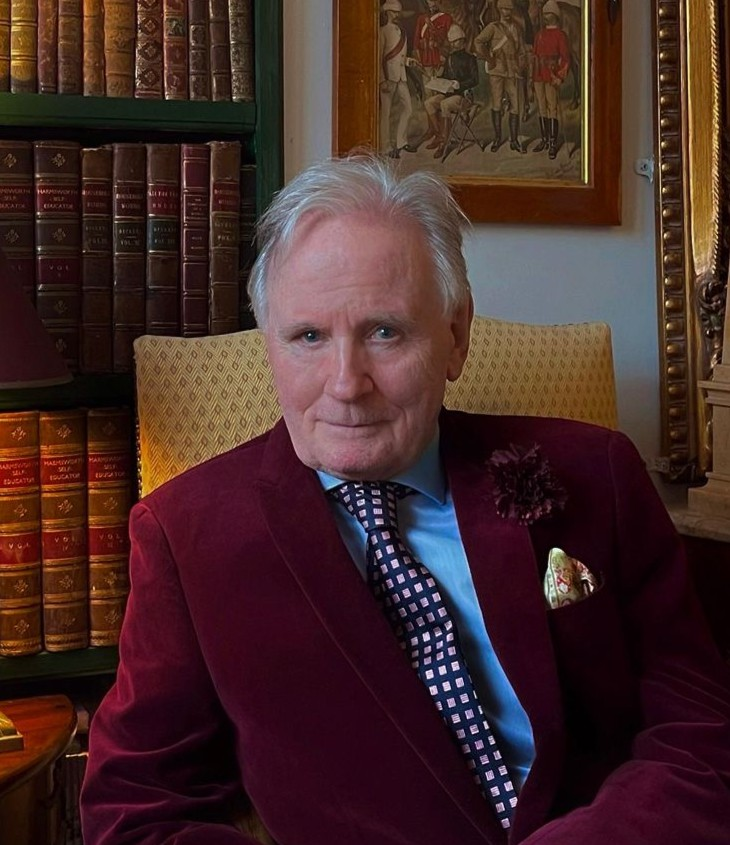
- Warren in 2026
- Born: Michael Allan Warren; 26 October 1948 (age 78); Wimbledon, London, England
- Occupations: Actor; photographer
- Years active: 1961–1981 (actor); 1968–present (photographer)
- Website: www.allanwarren.com

Michael Allan Warren (born 26 October 1948) is an English portrait photographer, writer and former actor, renowned for his distinctive images of high-society figures, entertainers, politicians, and members of the British royal family. Warren began his professional life as a child actor in London's theatre scene during the early 1960s, later appearing in acclaimed stage productions such as Alan Bennett's Forty Years On (1968), alongside Sir John Gielgud. He also appeared in films, including Here We Go Round the Mulberry Bush (1968) and Porridge (1979).

His photographic career gained prominence through intimate sittings with icons such as Salvador Dalí, Sir Noël Coward, Gloria Swanson, and Cary Grant, as well as royalty including Charles III, Prince Philip, and Lord Mountbatten, the latter of whom became a close friend. His portraits of numerous prominent public figures - often rendered in distinctive black-and-white and characterised by dramatic lighting - have been widely published and archived, establishing him as a visual chronicler of twentieth-century cultural and aristocratic life.

== Early life and education ==
After growing up in post-war London with his mother, Warren attended Terry's Juveniles, a stage school based in the Drury Lane Theatre. It was during this period that he attended auditions through which he received several assignments. One such piece of work was as a child presenter on Five O'Clock Club (1964), which afforded him the opportunity to associate with individuals such as Marc Bolan (then performing as "Toby Tyler"), who would later employ Warren as his first manager.

His godfather was the actor Billy Milton (1905–1989).

== Career ==
Warren started his photographic career at the age of 20, when he was acting in Alan Bennett's play Forty Years On with John Gielgud in the West End at the Apollo Theatre. Around this time, Warren bought his first second-hand camera and began to take photographs of his fellow actors. His first major assignment was in 1969 when his friend Mickey Deans asked him to cover his wedding to Judy Garland, which marked the beginning of Warren's work as a professional photographer.

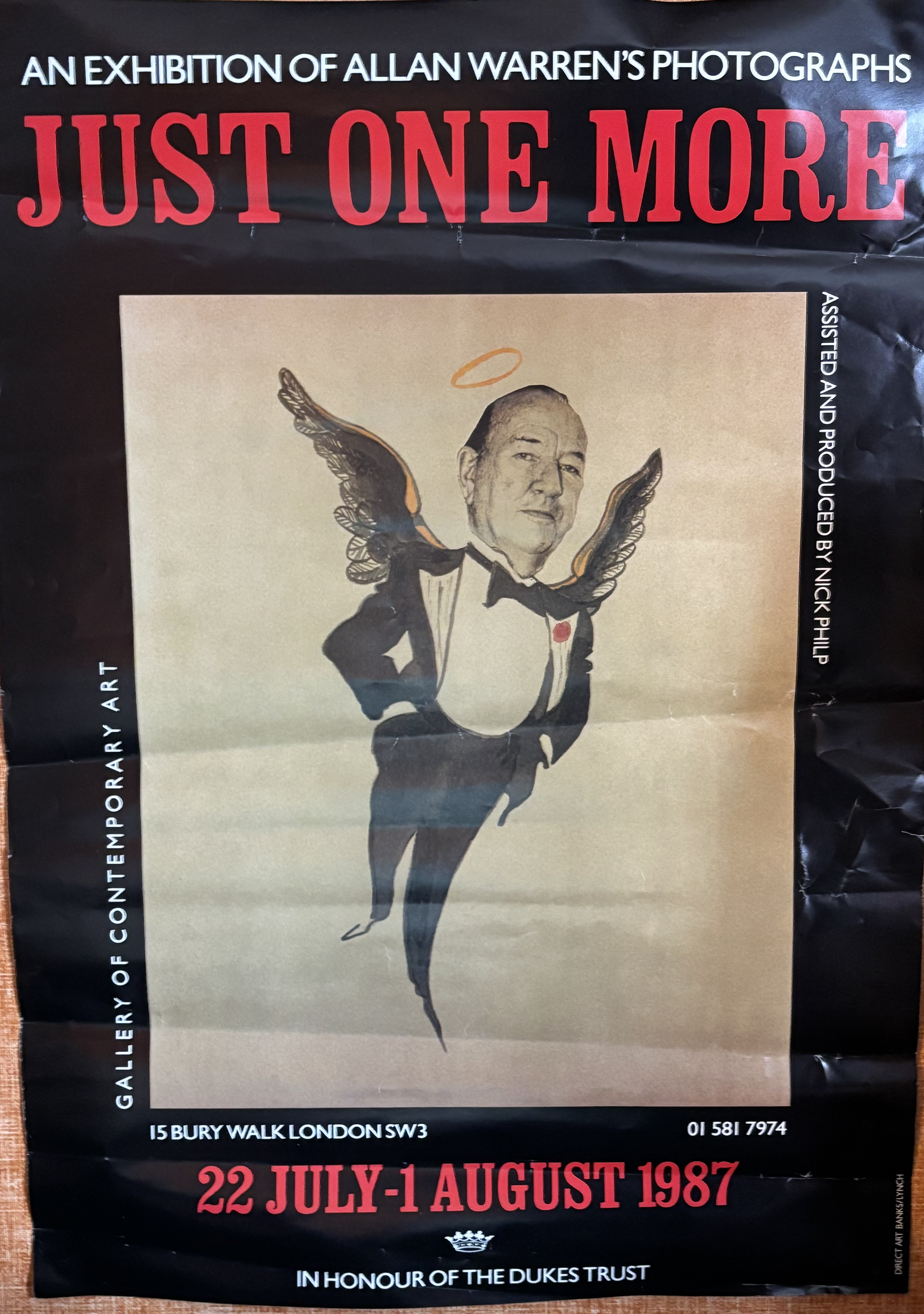
A Poster for 'Just One More: An Exhibition of Allan Warren's Photographs', London, 1987

After this decisive event, Warren embarked on his photography career, throughout which he took portraits of personalities including many actors, writers, musicians, politicians and members of the British royal family. In the early 1980s he embarked on a quest to photograph all 30 British dukes. Together with Angus Montagu, 12th Duke of Manchester he set up the Duke's Trust, a charity for children in need. Warren has uploaded many pictures from his archive to Wikimedia Commons, and many of those images have been used on Wikipedia pages, including the page on Warren himself.

And yet, there is a third art, the art of Allan Warren. Like every successful venture on this earth, it is the result of compromise or, in other words, the result of thought. Compromise is not necessarily pejorative, since it does not have to be between two evils, or even two different points of view. It may well be between two virtues of divergent character, which is the case here. The posed photograph may not have the vanity of the instant, seized in mid-air, in mid-sentence, in a flash, but it has perhaps even greater psychological insight, since here the subjects reveal not only what they are, but how they would like to be. Their faces make statements, but their expressions are translations of those statements in terms which the poser believes will be instantly understandable. Here, in these photographs, we see not only ourselves as we are, but as we see ourselves, as we wish to be considered, honest, tough, lovable, quizzical, reliable, irresistible, and even within the moderation imposed by our heeding, and our natural desire to conquer, callous, cruel, and delightfully wayward.

— Sir Peter Ustinov about Warren's style of photography in the introduction to Nobs & Nosh – Eating with the Beautiful People, 1974.

He held his first exhibition of photographs titled The Last Picture Show at the Photographic Training Centre's Night Gallery, Earl's Court, in 1980.

In the early 1990s, Warren embarked on writing plays. One of his works, The Lady of Phillimore Walk, was directed by Frank Dunlop and critics went as far as comparing it to Sleuth, a thriller written by Anthony Shaffer. The cast of The Lady of Phillimore Walk consisted of Zena Walker and Philip Lowrie; and saw productions in the United States.

Warren invented the Hankybreathe, a handkerchief which allows the user to inhale air through a carbon filter at the mouth, to filter out the noxious effects of exhaust emissions. The invention, which is meant to be dabbed in eucalyptus oil, harks back to the nosegay and stems from Warren's experience with asthma in heavily polluted London.

== Stage credits ==
- Forty Years On – Tupper (31 October 1968 to 24 November 1969), Apollo Theatre, London
- Child's Play – Shaw (23 February to 26 June 1971), Queen's Theatre, London
- Lionel (as producer; 16 May to June 1977), New London Theatre, London

== Filmography ==
Feature films

- Carry On Regardless (1961) - Child at Exhibition (uncredited)
- The Verdict (1964) - Page boy
- Here We Go Round the Mulberry Bush (1968) - Joe McGregor
- Popdown (1969) - Beach Dancing Man
- Toomorrow (1970) - Music Student (uncredited)
- To Catch a Spy (1971) - Waiter (uncredited)
- Baxter! (1973) - Photographer (uncredited)
- Queen of the Blues (1979) - Tony Carter
- Porridge (1979) - Whalley
- Riding High (1981) - Photographer

Television

- Egdar Wallace Mysteries (1964) - Episode: "The Verdict" - Page Boy
- The Marriage Lines (1965) - Episode: "Goodbye George - Goodbye Kate" - Telegram Boy
- David Copperfield (1966) - Episode: "Domestic Tangles" - Page
- ITV Play of the Week (1967) - Episode: "The Voysey Inheritance"
- ITV Sunday Night Theatre (1969) - Episode: "The Full Cheddar" - Firkin
- Play for Today (1970) - Episode: "The Right Prospectus" - Jenkins
- The Mind of Mr. J.G. Reeder (1971) - Episode: "Death of an Angel" - Clapper boy
- The Rivals of Sherlock Holmes (1971) - Episode: "The Horse of the Invisible" - Bootboy (uncredited)

As Self

- Five O'Clock Club (1964) - Host (4 episodes)
- Pebble Mill at One (1986) (1 episode)
- Secret Lives (1995) - Episode: "Mountbatten"
- Marc Bolan: The Final Word (2007) - Interviewee
- Respectable: The Mary Millington Story (2016) - Interviewee
- Royal Histories: Mountbatten: Hero or Villain? (2020) - Interviewee
- Saucy! Secrets of the British Sex Comedy (2024) (2 episodes)
- A Very British Sex Scandal: The Duchess and the Headless Man (2024) - Interviewee

Source: IMDB

== Exhibitions ==
- The Last Picture Show: An Exhibition by Allan Warren, Lauderdale House, 1980
- Just One More: An Exhibition of Allan Warren's Photographs, Gallery of Contemporary Art, 1987
- Come Up and See Me Sometime, Louise Hallett Gallery, 1988
- Swedish Navy by Allan Warren, The Box, Seven Dials, 2003
- Art of Giving, Saatchi Gallery, 2010
- Legende Celebrity Art & Art of Giving Pop-Up Gallery, Mayfair, 2010
- Christmas Show, La Galleria Pall Mall, 2010

== Gallery ==
Media related to Photographs by Allan Warren at Wikimedia Commons

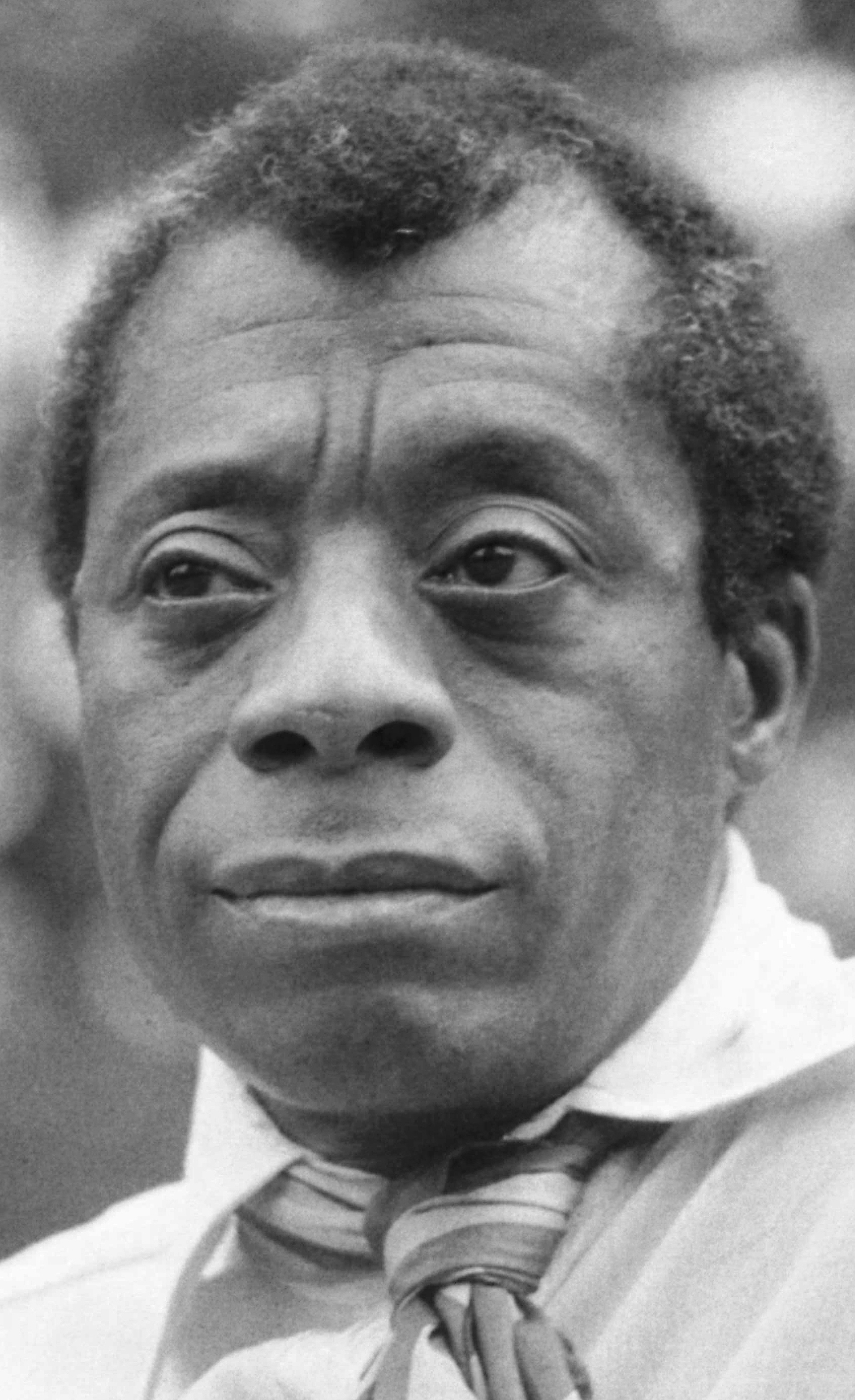
James Baldwin (1969)

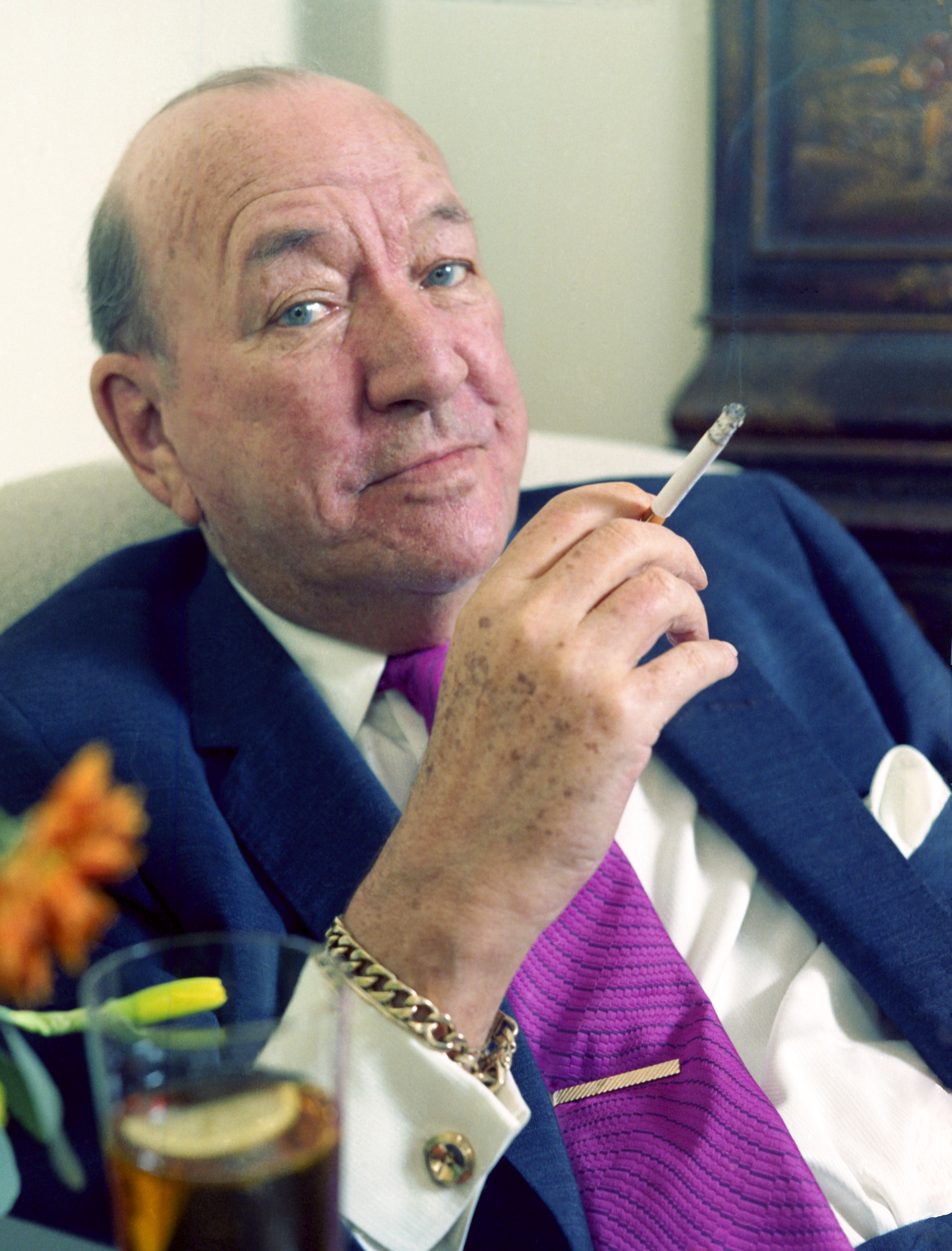
Sir Noël Coward (1972)

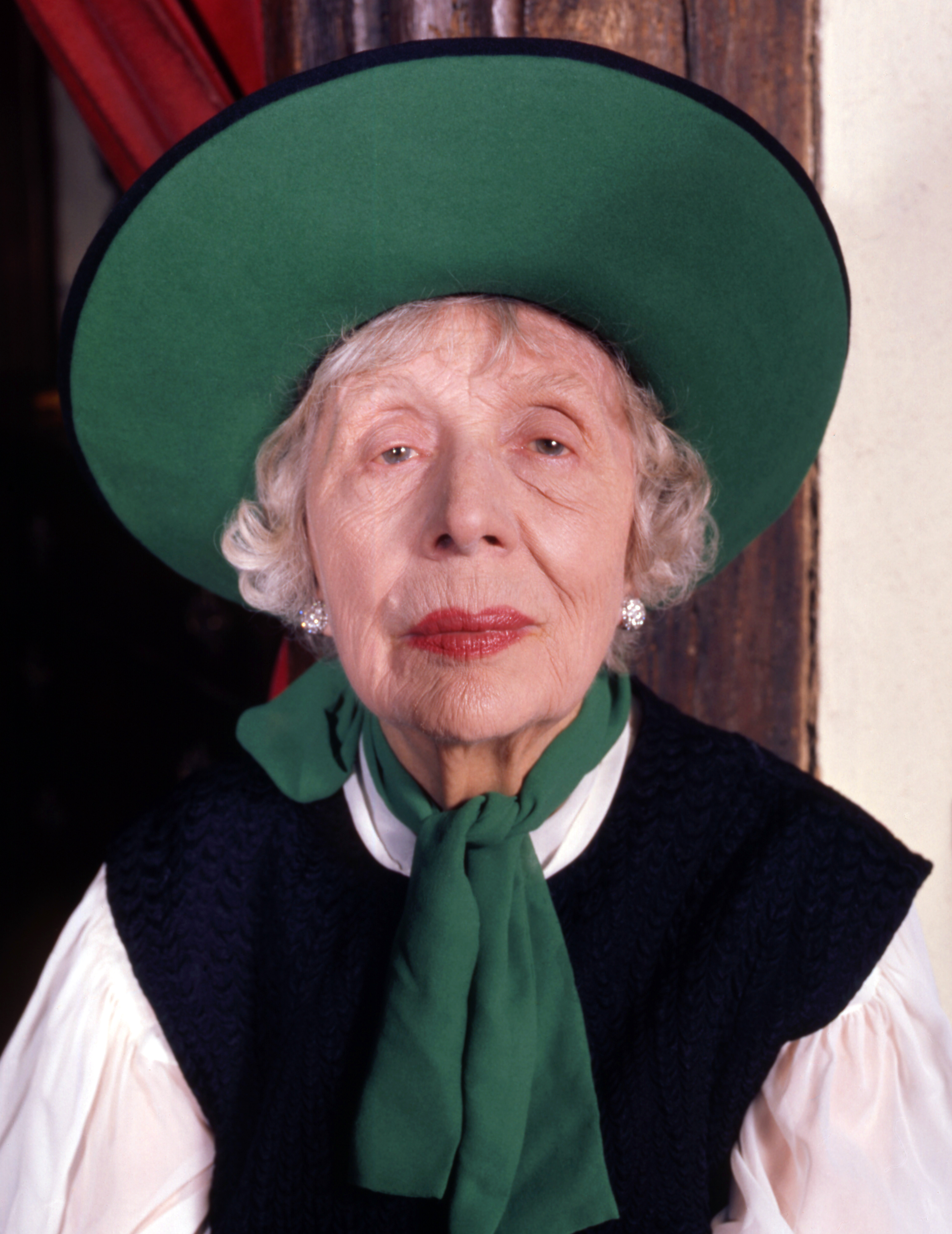
Dame Edith Evans (1972)

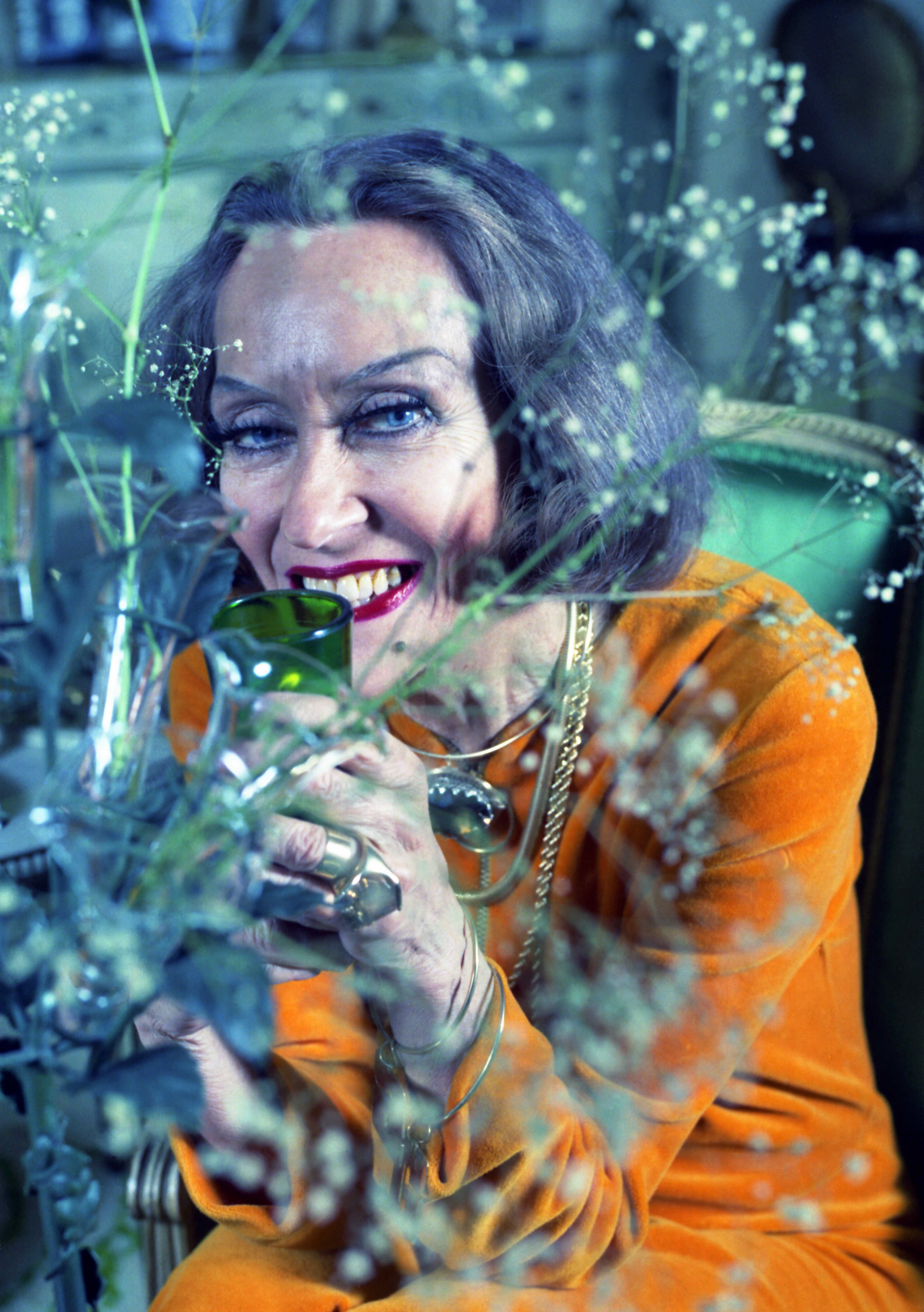
Gloria Swanson (1972)

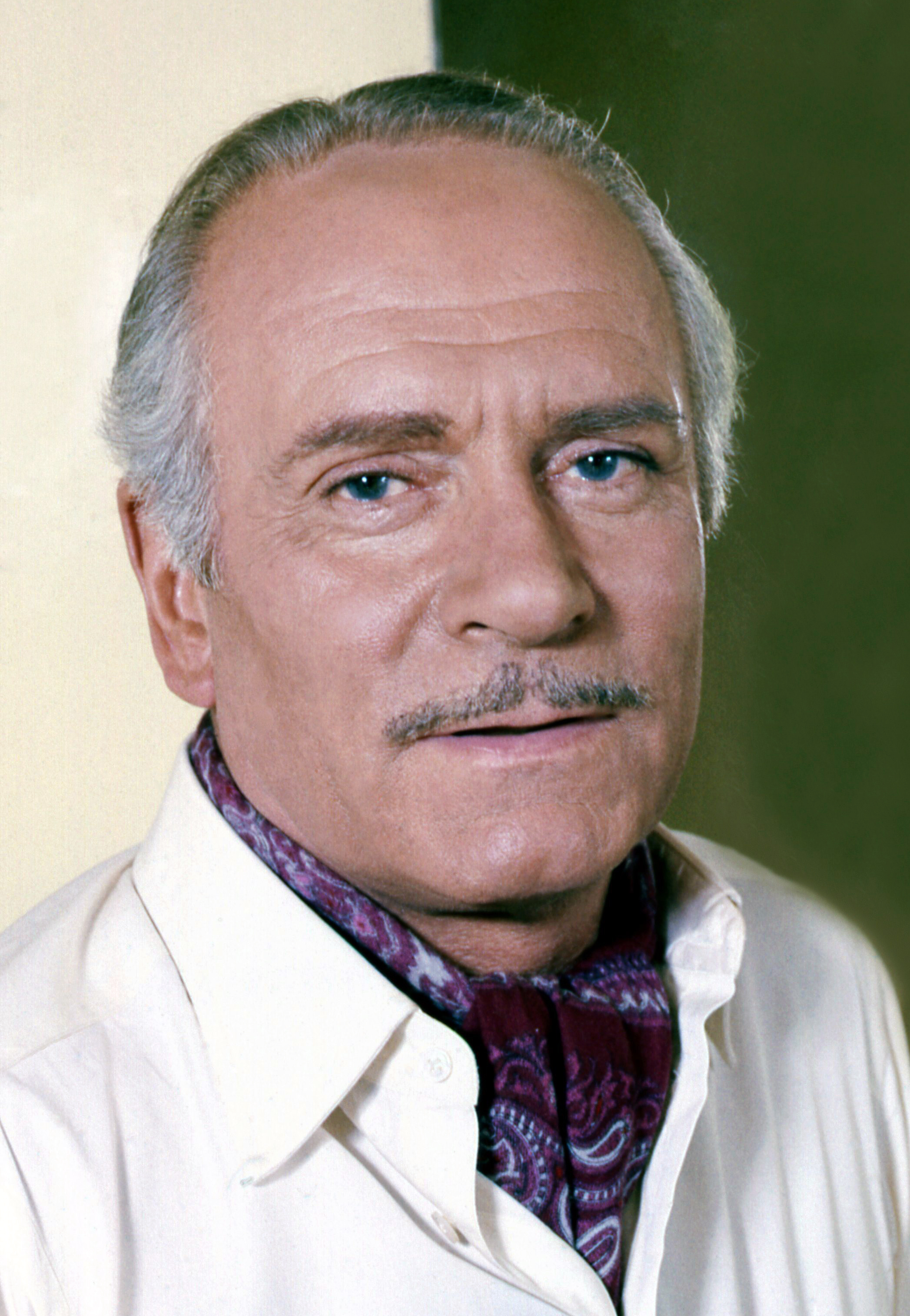
Lord Olivier (1972)

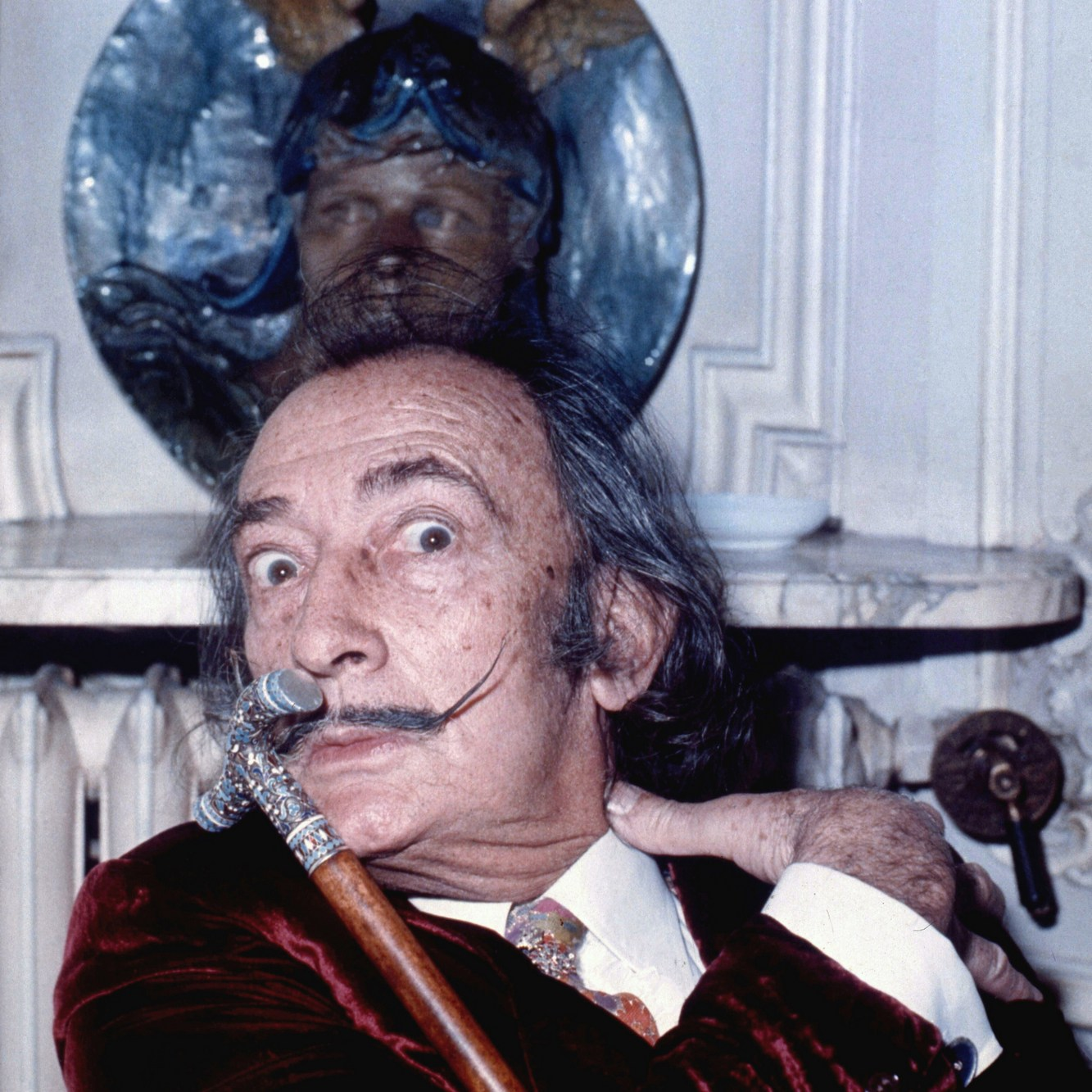
Salvador Dalí (1972)

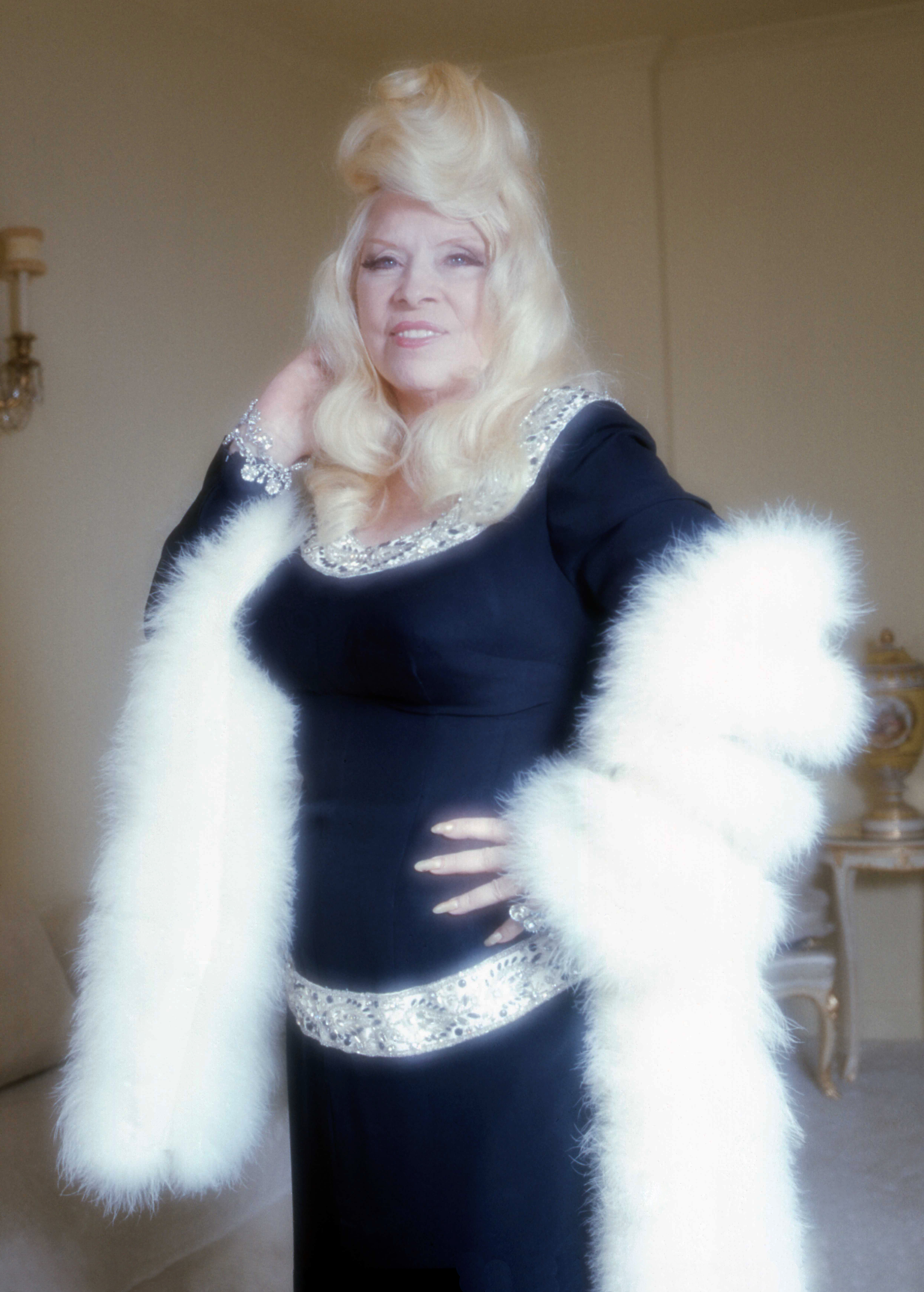
Mae West (1973)

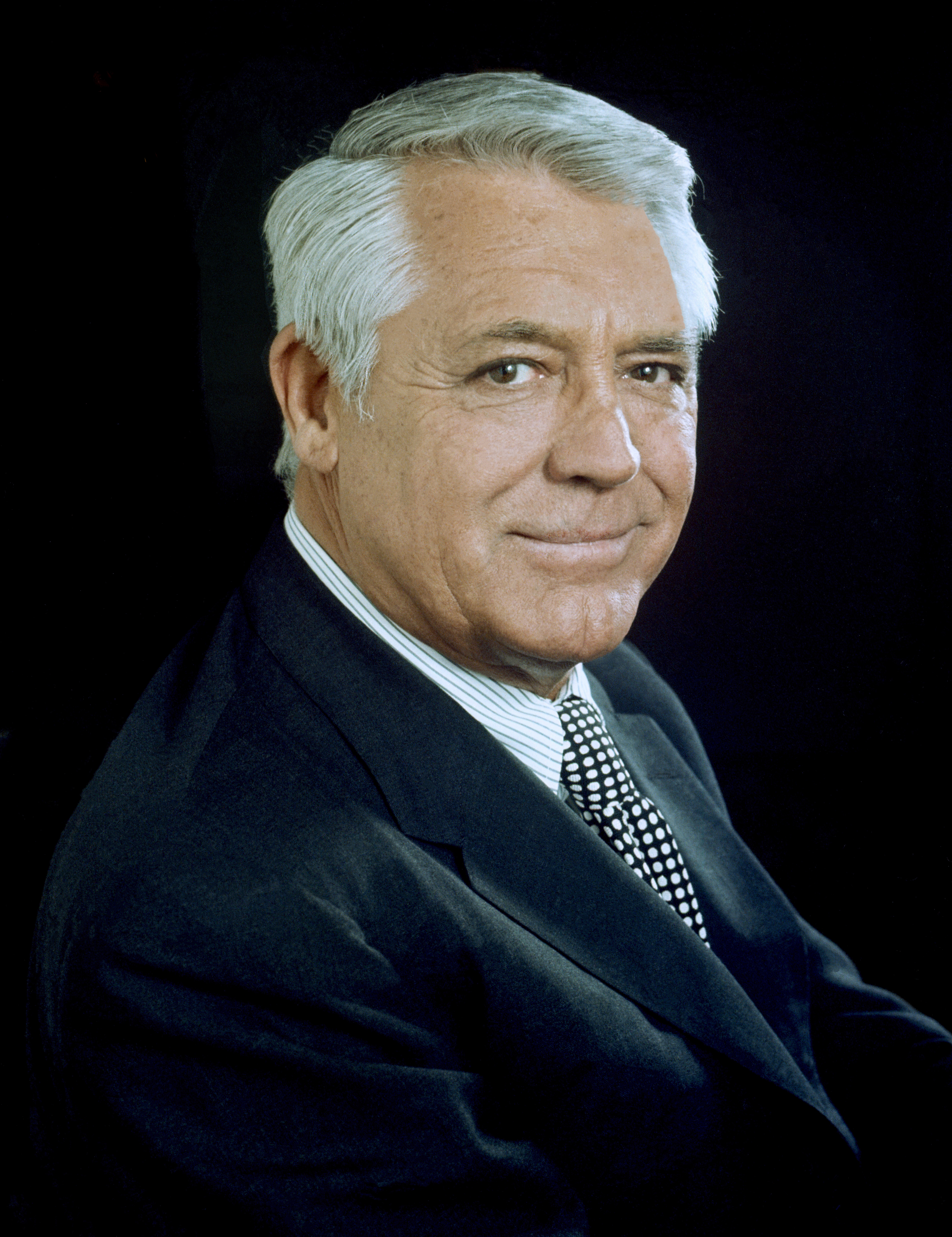
Cary Grant (1973)

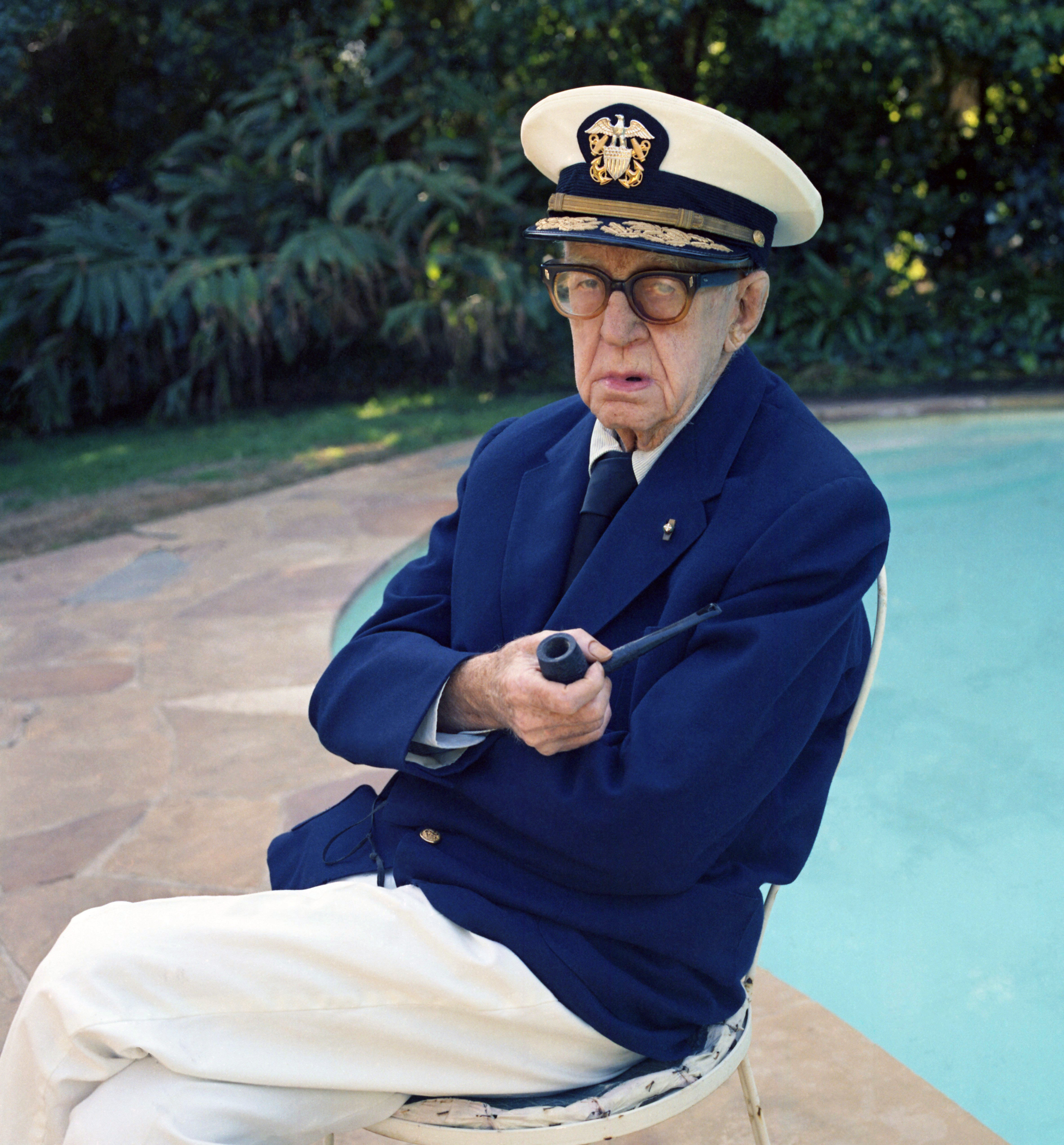
John Ford (1973)

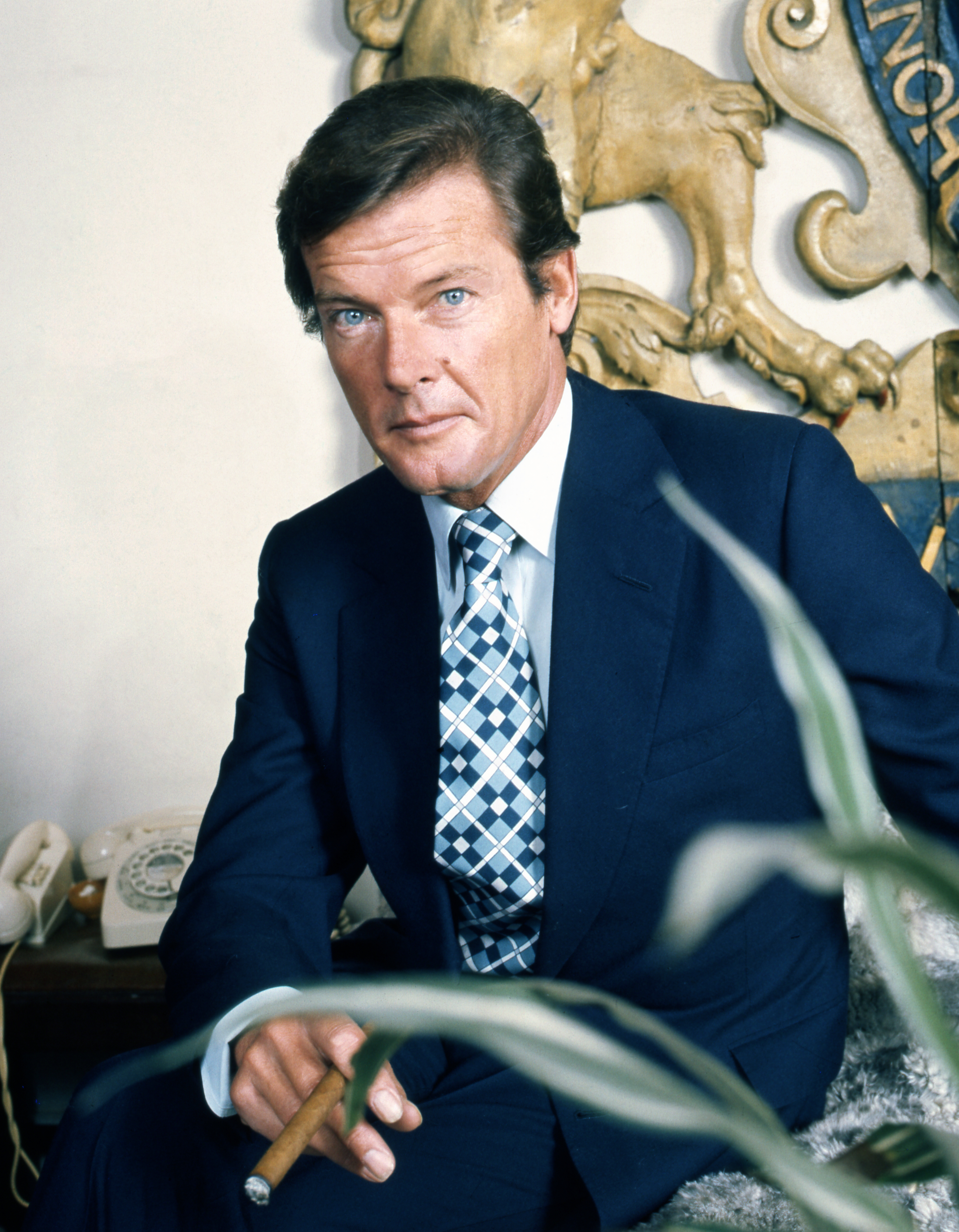
Roger Moore (1973)

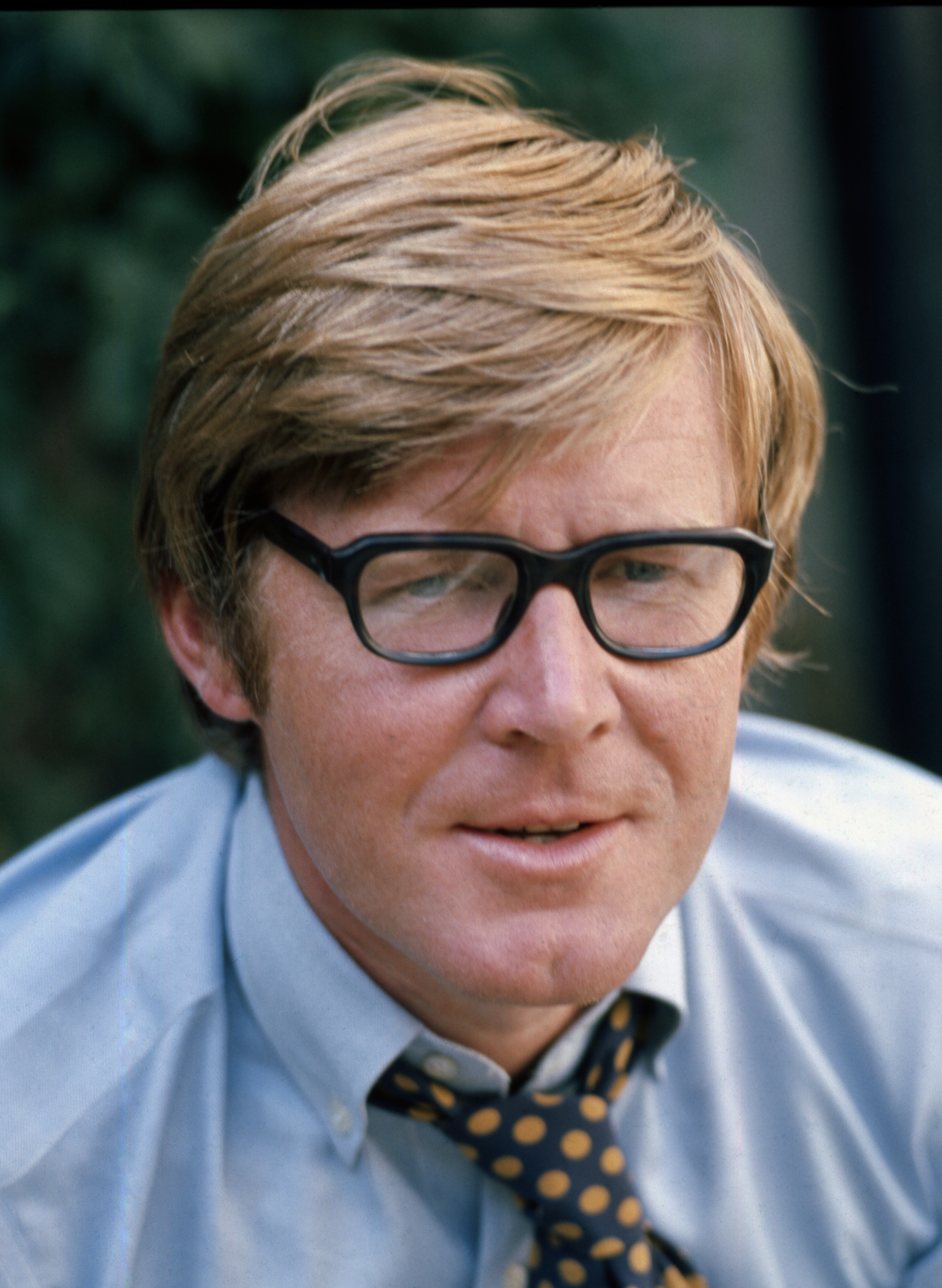
Alan Bennett (1973)

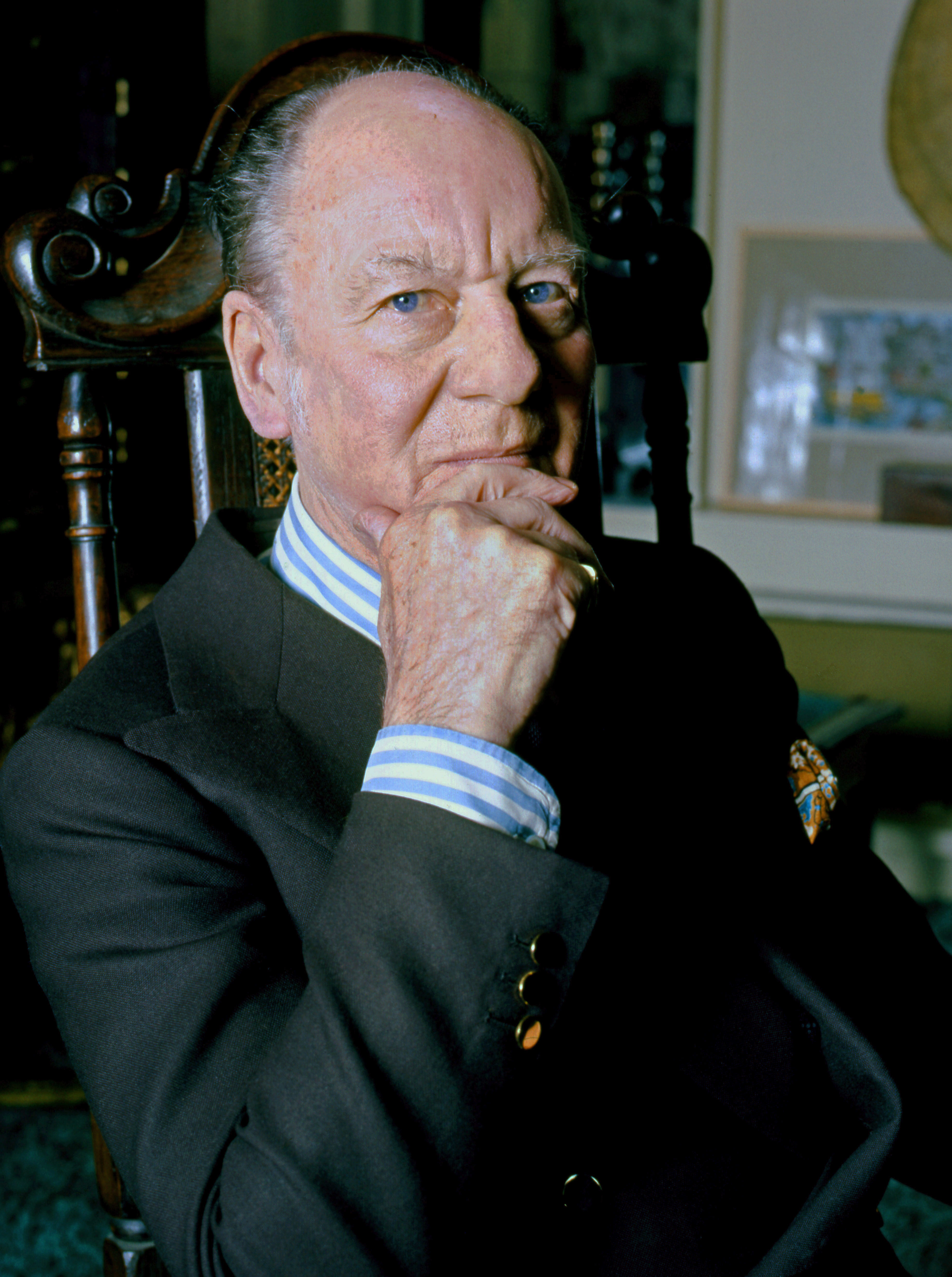
Sir John Gielgud (1973)

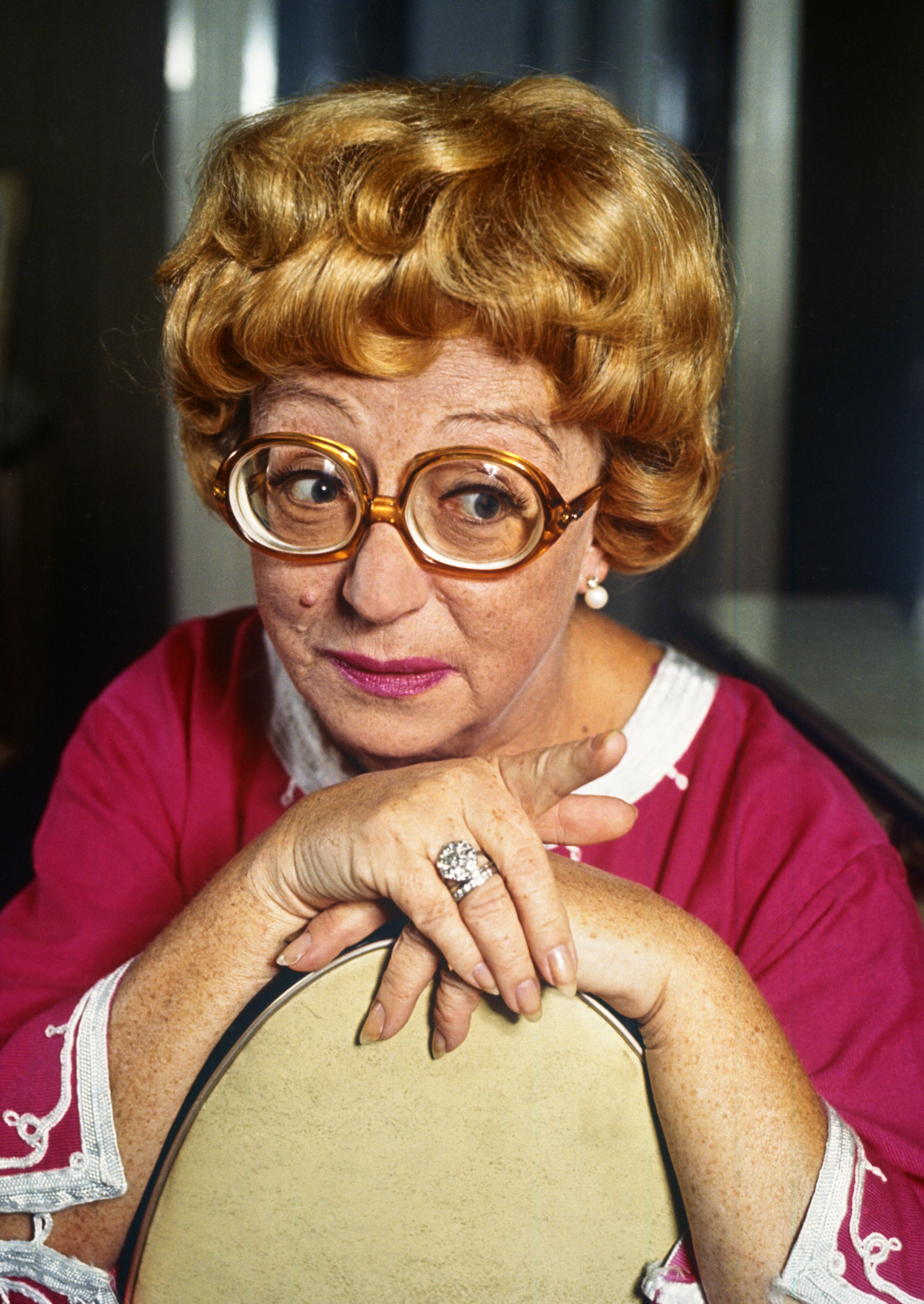
Dame Thora Hird (1974)

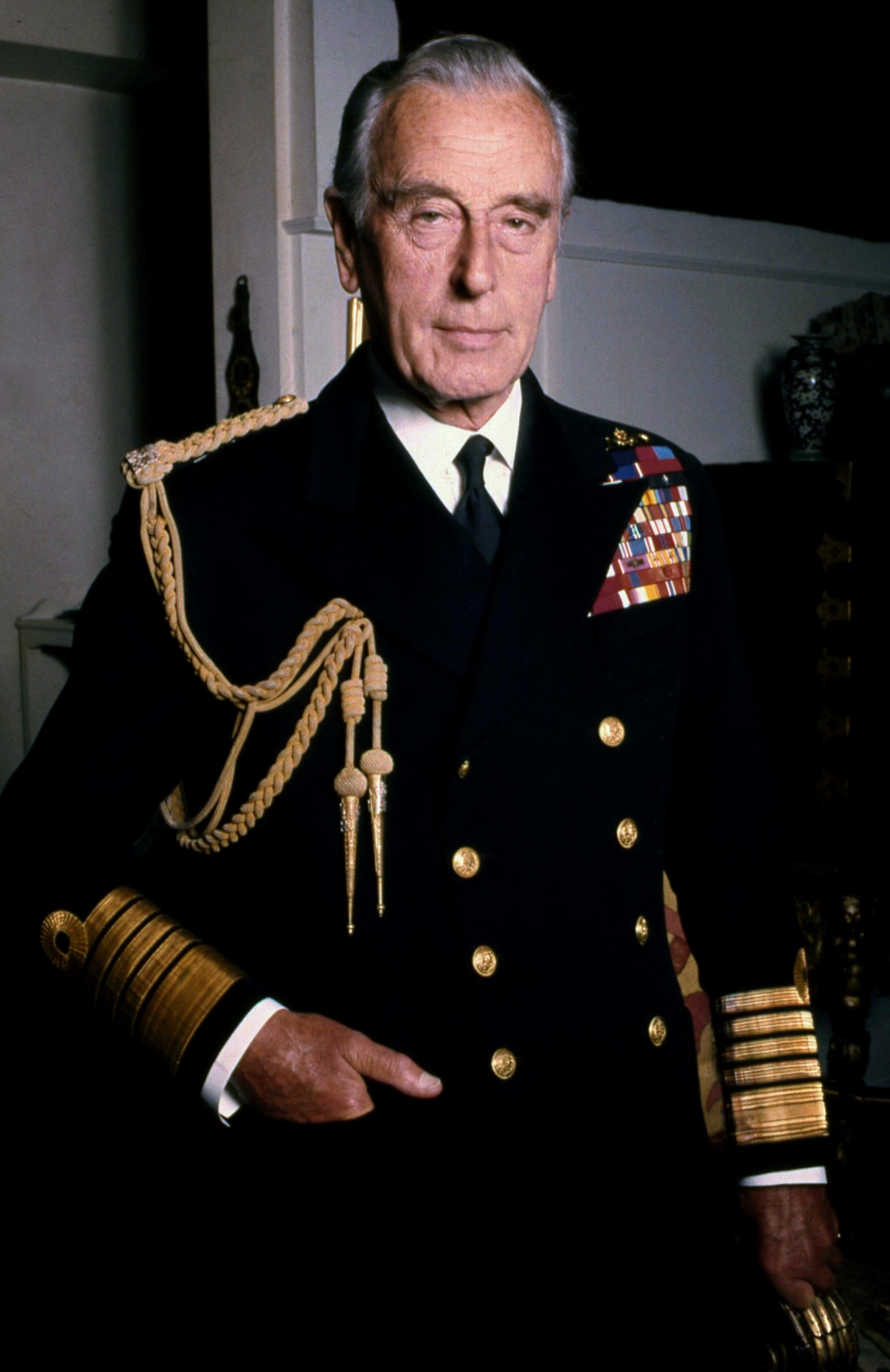
Earl Mountbatten of Burma (1976)

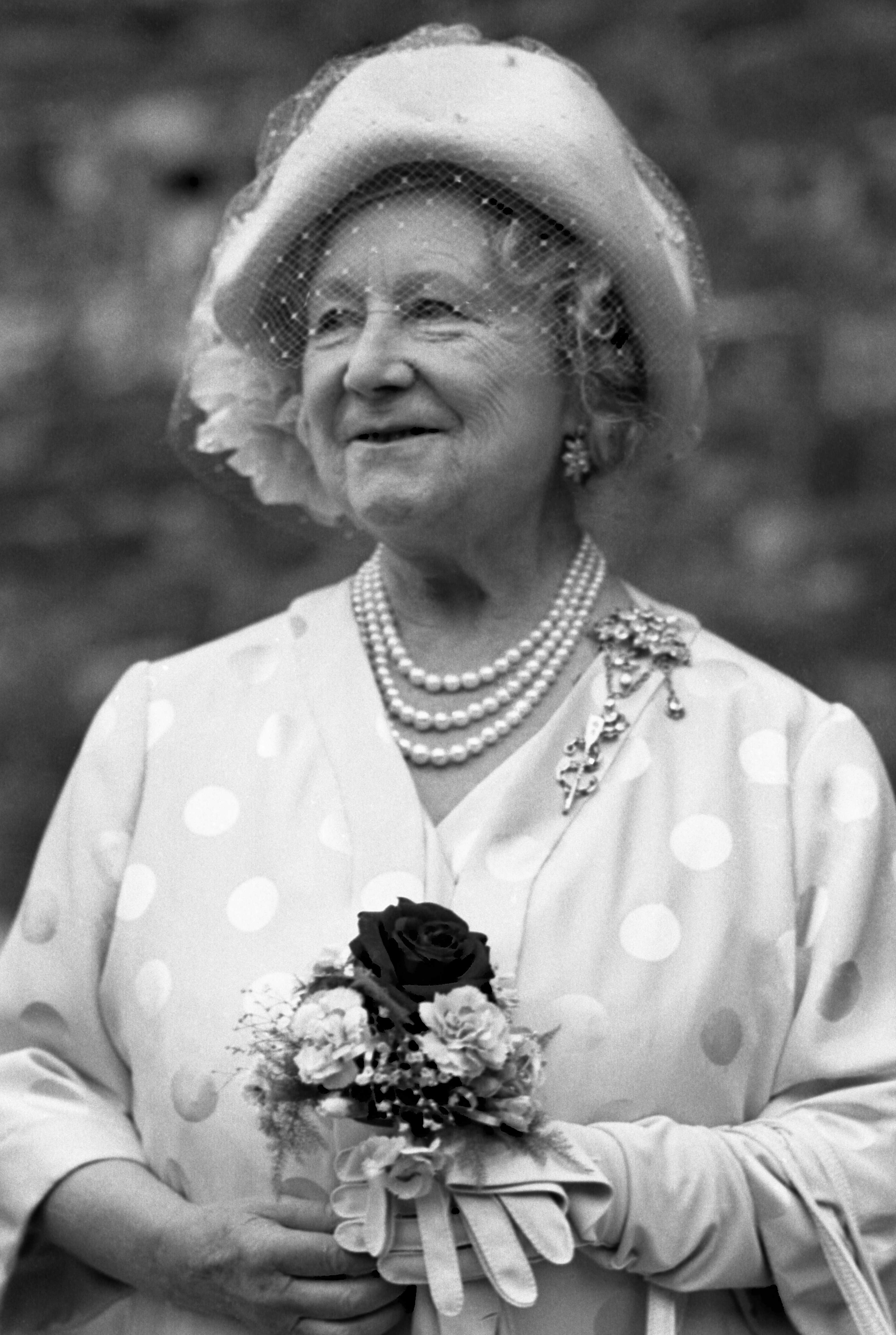
Queen Elizabeth the Queen Mother (c.1980)

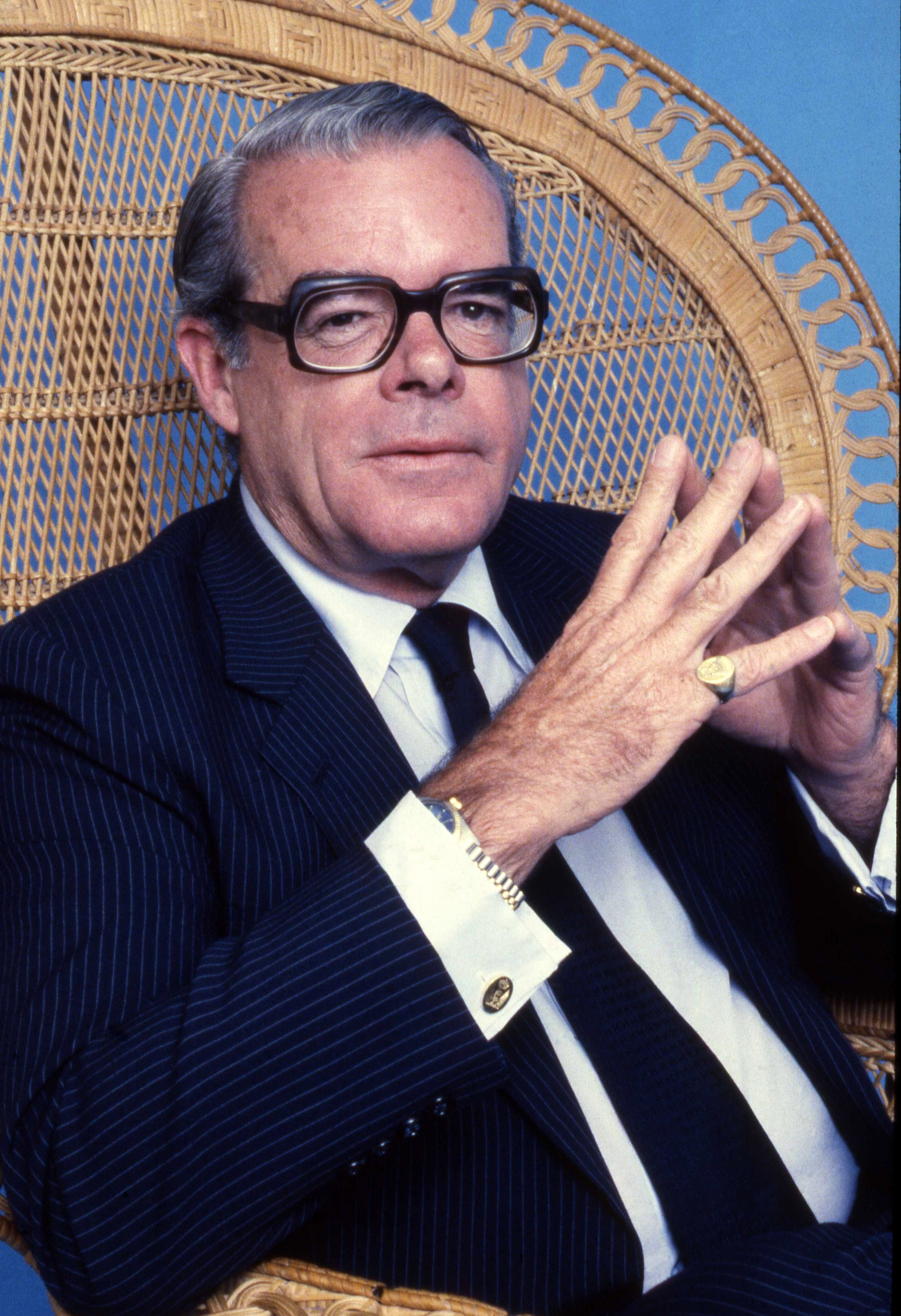
The 11th Duke of Manchester (1981)

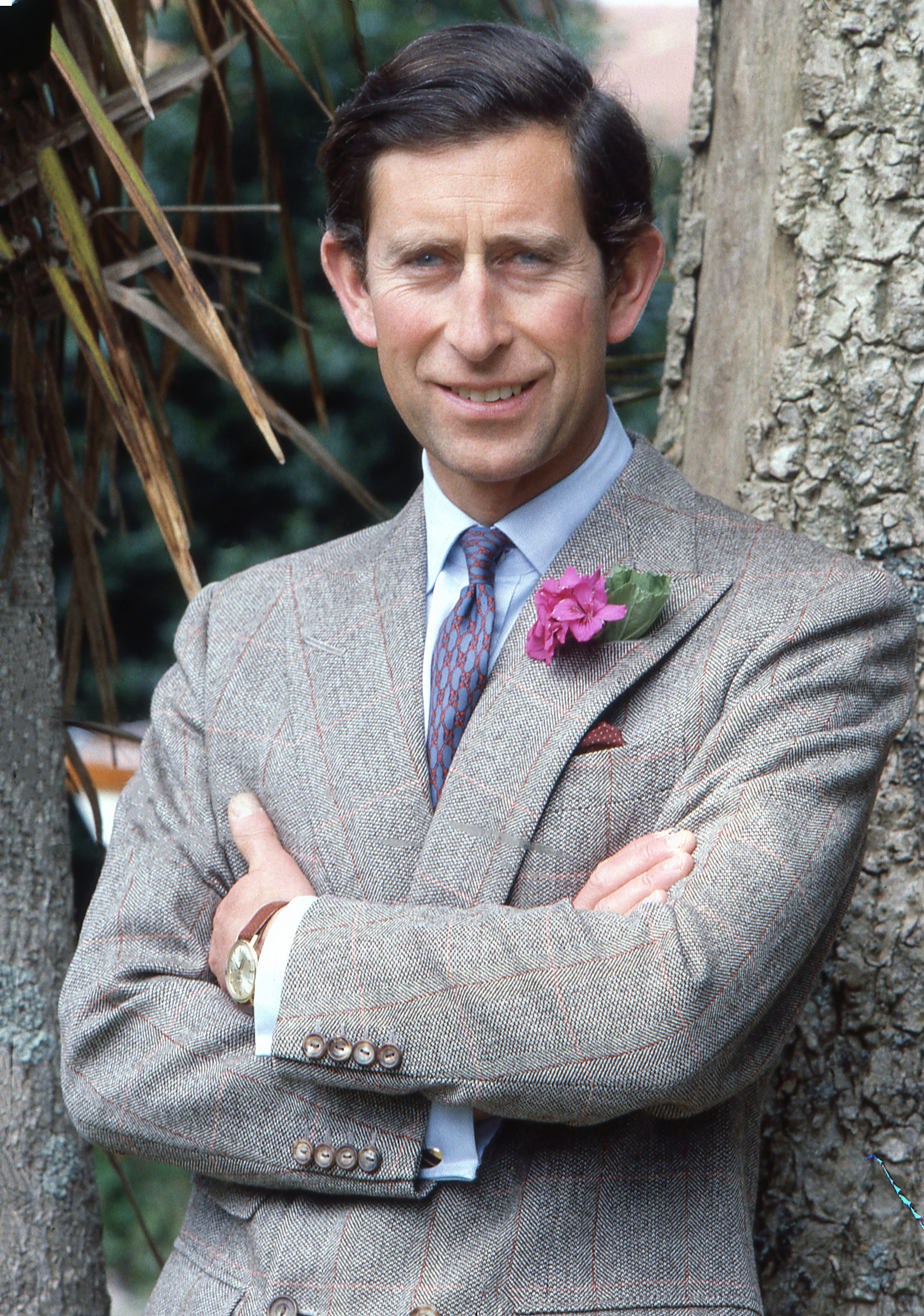
Charles III (1984)

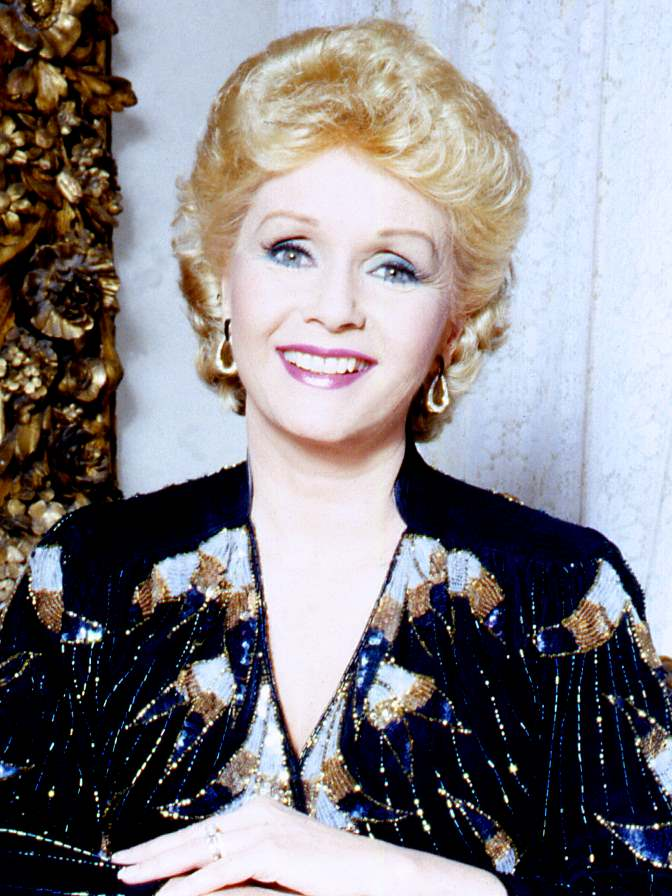
Debbie Reynolds (1987)

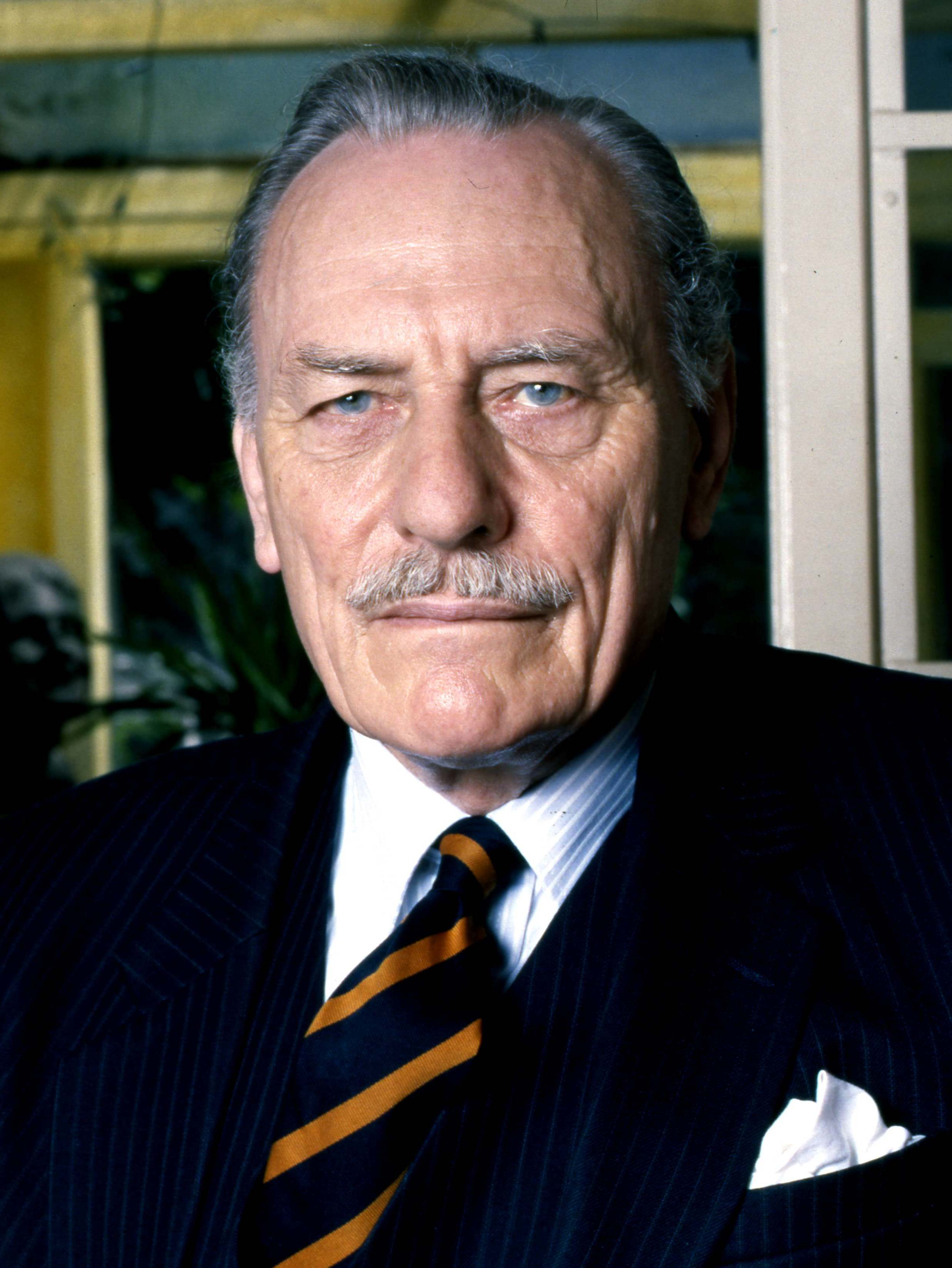
Enoch Powell (1987)

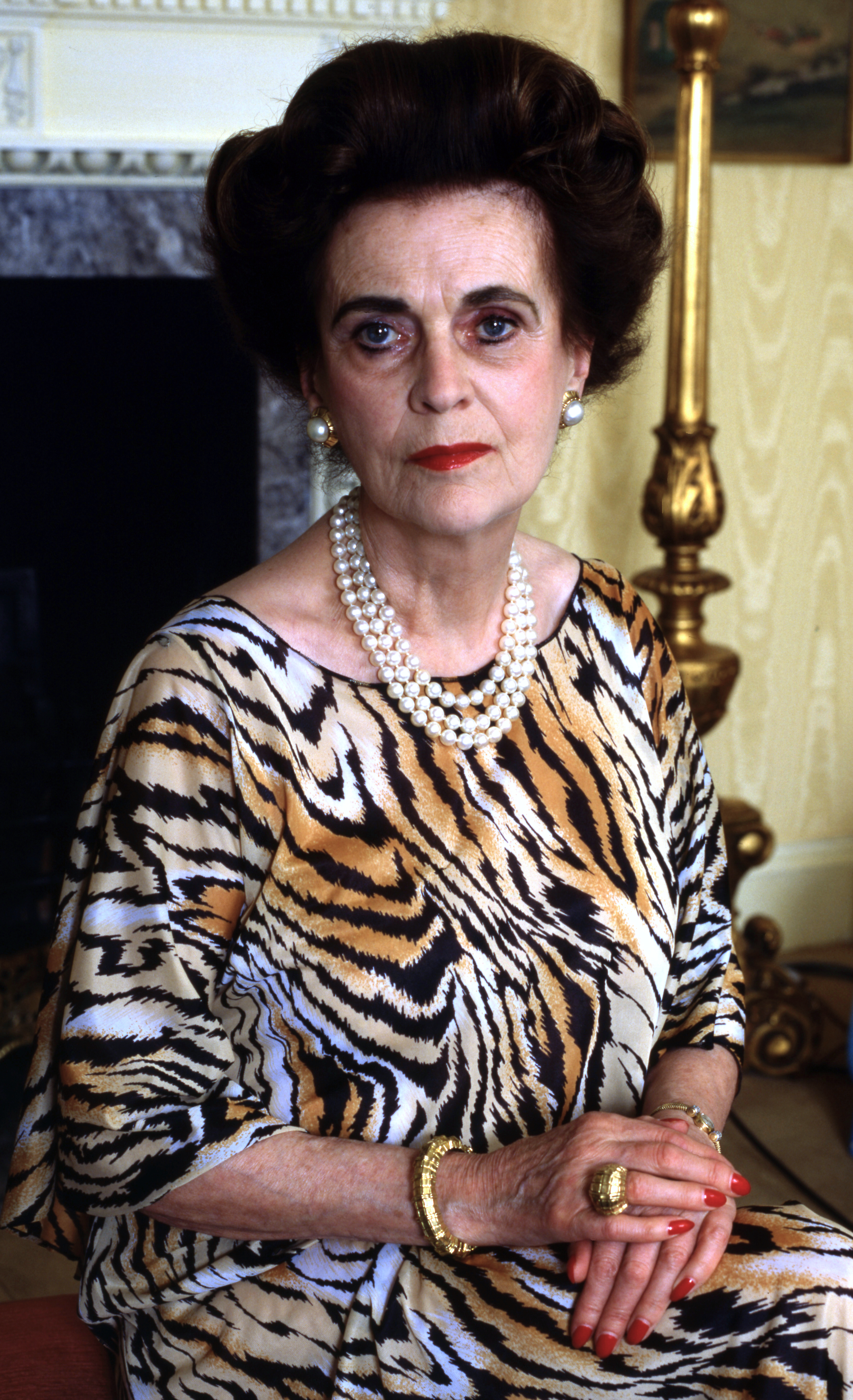
Margaret, Duchess of Argyll (1991)

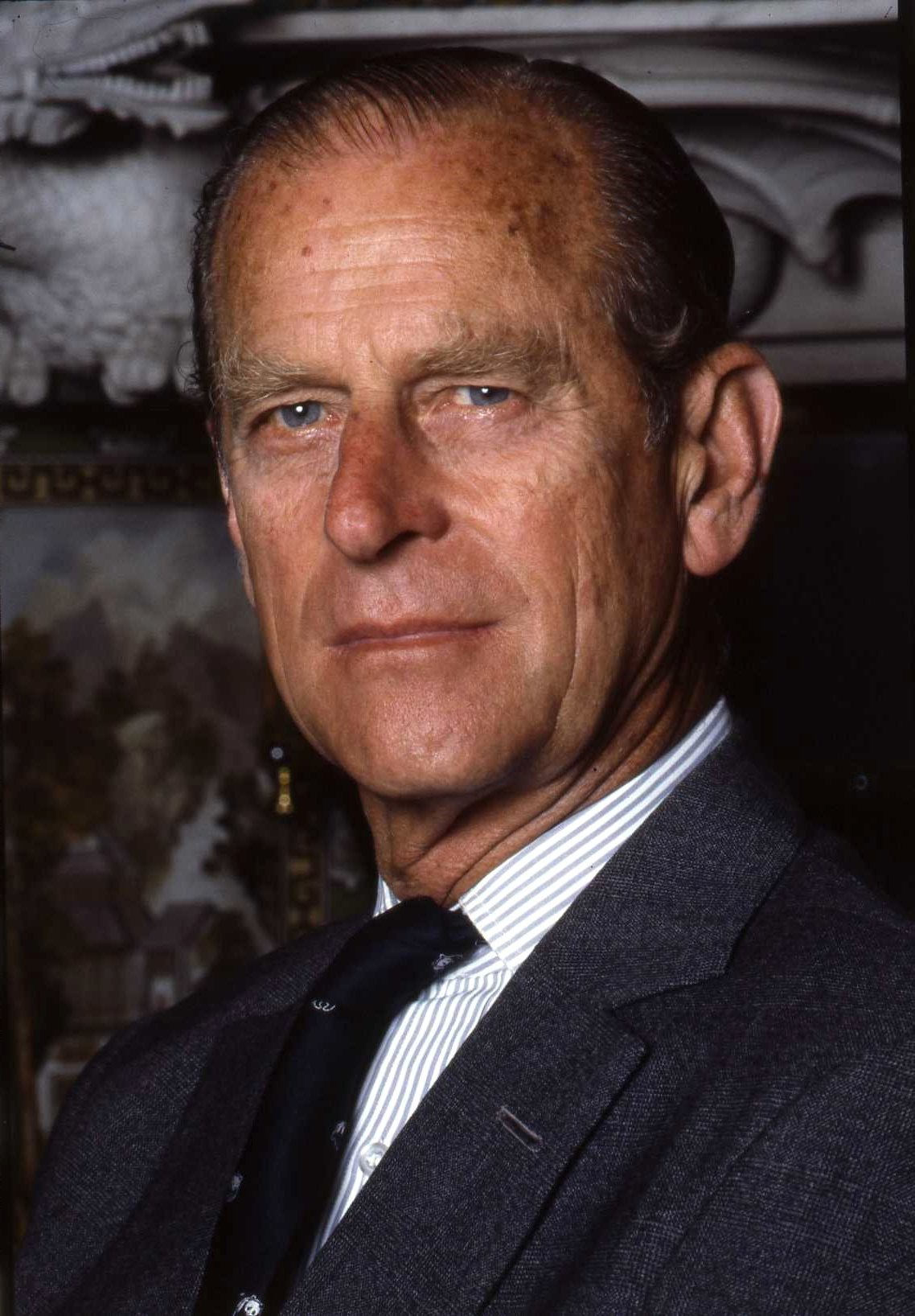
Prince Philip, Duke of Edinburgh (1992)

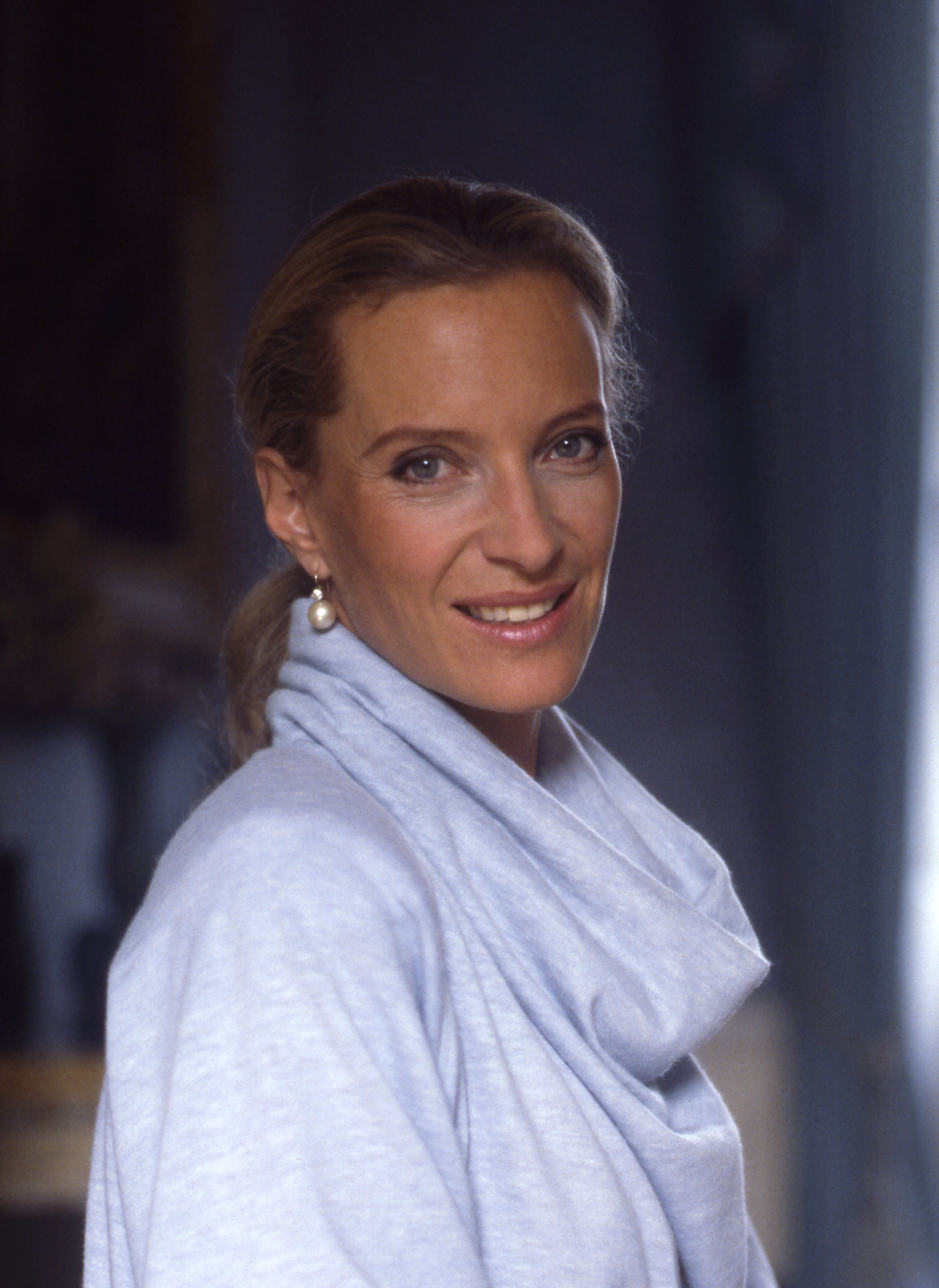
Princess Michael of Kent (1999)

== Bibliography ==
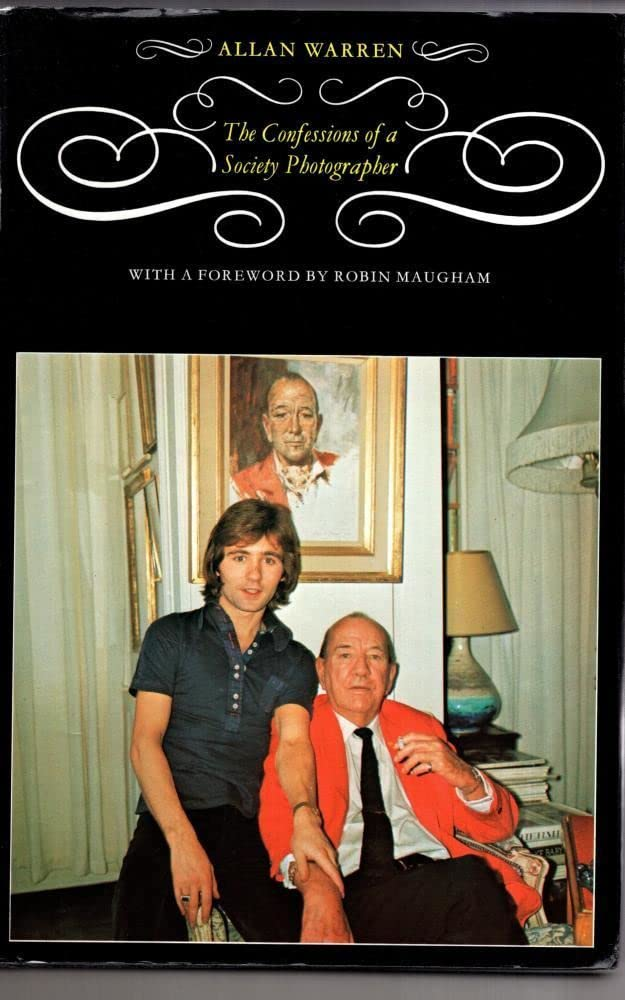
Confessions of a Society Photographer (1976), Allan Warren photographed on the front cover alongside Sir Noël Coward

Photography books and memoirs

- Nobs & Nosh: Eating with the Beautiful People (1974)
- Confessions of a Society Photographer (1976)
- The Dukes of Britain (1986)
- Dukes, Queens and Other Stories (1999)
- Strangers in the Buff (2007)
- Nein Camp: My Struggle (2012)
- Stand By to Repel All Boarders (2014)

Plays and fiction

- The Lady of Phillimore Walk (1991)
- The Carpet Dwellers (2007) (illustrated children's book)
- The Matching Pair Part 1: No Good Deed (2021)
- The Matching Pair Part 2: Double Act (2022)
- The Sweet Revenge of Peter Brock (2023)
