= The Riot Squad =

English pop group

- The Riot Squad; David Bowie is shown top second left

Background information
- Origin: London, England, United Kingdom
- Genres: Rock, pop
- Years active: 1964–1967
- Label: Pye Records
- Past members: --Larry Page-era-- Graham Bonney (vocals); Ron Ryan (guitar); Mark Stevens (keyboards); Mike Martin (bass); Brian Davies (bass); Mitch Mitchell (drums); Rodger Crisp (Bass); Bob Evans (saxophone, flute) --Joe Meek-era-- Terry Clifford (guitar); Brian "Butch" Davis (piano); Len Tuckey (guitar); Derek "Del" Roll (drums); Bob Evans (saxophone, flute); Keith "Nero" Gladman (vocals) --The cabaret act-- David Bowie (lead vocalist, guitar, tenor saxophone); Rod Davies (guitar); Brian "Croak" Prebble (vocals); George Butcher (keyboards); Derek Roll (drums); Bob Evans (saxophone, flute); Caldwell Smythe (vocals)

The Riot Squad were a pop group from London, initially managed and produced by Larry Page and later, for their reunion, by Joe Meek.

The band was formed in late 1964 by Ron Ryan (guitar), Graham Bonney (vocals), Bob Evans (saxophone), Mark Stevens (keyboards), Mike Martin (bass), and Mitch Mitchell (drums). Ron Ryan (born Ronald Patrick Ryan, 20 April 1940, Islington, North London) had, earlier in the decade, written songs and arrangements for the Dave Clark Five, largely uncredited. He left The Riot Squad in early 1965. The only constant member of the band was Bob Evans, who, after the band split for the first time, "reunited" The Riot Squad with all new musicians. Later members included Len Tuckey (guitar), Brian Davies (bass), Roger Crisp (bass), Terry Clifford (guitar), Butch Davis (piano), and Derek "Del" Roll (drums).

In early 1967, they were joined by David Bowie, who at the time was recording material for his self-titled debut album. The band consisted of six members: Bowie (vocal, guitar, mouth-harp), Rod "Rook" Davies (lead guitar), Brian "Croak" Prebble (bass, vocals), Bob Evans (tenor saxophone, flute, vocals), George "Butch" Davis (keyboards) and Derek "Del" Roll (drums). This incarnation recorded several tracks, including a cover of the Velvet Underground's "I'm Waiting for the Man", and a Velvets-influenced Bowie original called "Little Toy Soldier," which lifts its chorus nearly verbatim from The Velvets' "Venus in Furs." These and other songs featuring David Bowie were officially released in 2012 on The Last Chapter: Mods & Sods.

"I Take It That We're Through" was included on the 2004 curated compilation Spacelines by Peter Kember of Spacemen 3.

== Discography ==
- "Anytime" / "Jump" (Pye 7N 15752, January 1965)
- "I Wanna Talk About My Baby" / "Gonna Make You Mine" (Pye 7N 15817, June 1965)
- "Nevertheless" / "Not a Great Talker" (Pye 7N 15869, September 1965)
- "Cry, Cry, Cry" / "How Is it Done" (Pye 7N 17041, January 1966)
- "I Take it That We're Through" / "Working Man" (Pye 7N 17092, April 1966)
- "It's Never Too Late to Forgive" / "Try to Realise" (Pye 7N 171730, July 1966)
- "Gotta Be a First Time" / "Bittersweet Love" (Pye 7N 17237, 1967)
