= Ayshea =

British singer, actress, presenter (born 1948)

- Also known as: Ayshea Brough
- Born: Ayshea Hague; 12 November 1948 (age 78); Highgate, London, England
- Genre: Pop
- Occupations: Singer, actress, television presenter
- Instrument: Vocals
- Years active: 1958–1977
- Labels: Philips; Fontana; Harvest; DJM
- Website: ayshea.me.uk

Ayshea (/ˈaɪʃə/; born Ayshea Hague, 12 November 1948) is a British former singer, actress and television presenter. She is best known for playing Lieutenant Ayshea Johnson on the sci-fi series UFO and for being the host of the popular television series Lift Off with Ayshea.

== Early life ==
Ayshea Hague was born in London in 1948. She spent a few years as a child living in France before returning to London. She attended Arts Educational Schools.

== Career ==
=== Acting ===
She made her film debut at the age of nine as an uncredited extra in the film Tom Thumb (1958). She made appearances on television shows such as Thank Your Lucky Stars and Discotheque. Granada TV's producer Muriel Young hired Ayshea to host her own pop show, Lift Off with Ayshea, in 1969. The series ran for 122 episodes until 1974.

Ayshea was a regular on quiz shows such as The Golden Shot and Celebrity Squares. As an actress, she appeared on Jason King and had a recurring role on UFO, the Gerry Anderson live-action series. In 2024 Ayshea was honoured by the Asian Media Awards where she was given the Outstanding Contribution to Media Award.

=== Music ===
As a teenager, she was signed to her first record label, Fontana, which released her debut single, "Eeny Meeny", in 1965. In 1965 and 1966 she toured in the UK with Jimmy Cliff as part of his band The New Generation. She recorded a total of eight singles and two albums on six different labels (Fontana, Polydor, RCA, MAM, Harvest and DJM) between 1965 and 1977 however none of these ever charted.

== Personal life ==
After being romantically linked with Steve Winwood, Chas Chandler and Rod Stewart, she married Cat Stevens's record producer, Chris Brough (the son of ventriloquist Peter Brough), who produced her records and was her manager. After Ayshea and Chris Brough divorced in the early 1970s she dated Roy Wood who wrote and produced her single "Farewell". They were engaged for a year but never married.

Following the engagement to Roy Wood, she later married Steve Alder (1950—1997) who had the lead role in the London stage production of the musical Jesus Christ Superstar as Jesus Christ.

While staying with her friend Susan George in the US, Ayshea met and married the agent and film producer Michael Levy in 1983 and worked as an interior designer. She started a property development company. In the early 2000s Ayshea moved back to the UK (in Grantham, Lincolnshire) to be close to her mother, Rose.

== Filmography ==
=== Film ===
Year	Title	Role	Notes
1958	Tom Thumb	Girl	Uncredited
1963	Nine Hours to Rama	Bride	Uncredited
1966	Fumo di Londra	Girl	Uncredited

=== Television ===
Years	Title	Role	Notes
1965	Thank Your Lucky Stars	Herself	One episode
1969—1974	Lift Off with Ayshea	Herself	Show host, eighty-nine episodes
1969	Discotheque	Herself	Seven episodes
1970—1971	UFO	Lieutenant Ayshea Johnson	Twenty episodes
1970—1971	Anything You Can Do	Herself	Show judge, three episodes
1970—1971	The Golden Shot	Herself	Two episodes
1971	Jason King	Mireille	One episode
1972	Stars on Sunday	Herself	One episode
1974	Rock on with 45	Herself	Two episodes
1975	Look Alive	Herself	One episode
1976	Celebrity Squares	Herself	One episode
2013	Goodbye Granadaland	Herself	Archive footage, documentary
2016	The Women of UFO	Herself	Archive footage, documentary
2016	From Earth to the Moon	Herself	Video
2020	The No-Name Trivia Show	Herself	Series
2023—2025	The Gerry Anderson Podcast	Herself	Podcast

== Discography ==
=== Albums ===
Year	Label	Title
1970	Polydor Records	Ayshea
1974	DJM Records	Lift Off with Ayshea

=== Singles ===
Year	Label	A-side	B-side
1965	Fontana Records	"Eeny Meeny"	"Keep My Love"
1968	Polydor Records	"Celebration of the Year"	"Only Love Can Save Me Now"
1969	Polydor Records	"Another Night"	"Taking the Sun from My Eyes"
1970	Polydor Records	"Mister White's White Flying Machine"	"Ship of the Line"
1970	Polydor Records	"Who's Gonna Rescue Jesus?"	"Flowers Are Mine"
1971	RCA Records	"Master Jack"	"Both Sides Now"
1972	MAM Records	"An Old Fashioned Love Song"	"The Family of Man"
1973	Harvest Records	"Farewell"	"The Best Years of My Life"
1974	DJM Records	"Another Without You Day"	"Moonbeam"
1975	DJM Records	"Don't Wait Till Tomorrow"	"Moonbeam"
1975	DJM Records	"The Flowers Will Never Die"	"The Best Years of My Life"
1977	DJM Records	"Golden Oldie"	"Keep Me from Blowing Away"
