= Johnny Martyn =

British singer (born 1934)

Johnny Martyn Booker (16 July 1934 – 19 March 2007) was a musician and coffee bar manager. He was one of the original members of The Vipers Skiffle Group. Fellow musician and Vipers member Wally Whyton were members of The Original Soho Skiffle Group. He was born in London, England and died in Vancouver, British Columbia, Canada.
