= Roy North =

English actor and presenter (born 1941)

- Born: Roy Stathers; 16 April 1941 (age 84); Kingston upon Hull, England
- Occupations: Actor; television presenter

Roy North (born Roy Stathers, 16 March 1941) is an English actor and television presenter who is best known for being the companion of Basil Brush from 1973 to 1976 under the name Mr Roy.

== Early life ==
Roy Stathers was born on 16 March 1941, in Kingston upon Hull, East Riding of Yorkshire. He attended the local Hull Grammar School before travelling south to London to study acting at Rose Bruford College. When registering with Equity, he chose to adopt Roy North as his stage name.

== Career ==
After graduating in 1966, he began appearing in repertory theatre back in Yorkshire and also in West End musical productions and pantomimes. During a production of Joseph and the Amazing Technicolor Dreamcoat on the West End in 1973, he was given a chance to get his big break. North successfully auditioned as the replacement for Derek Fowlds on the Basil Brush Show. His new role saw him become the titular character's sidekick and companion, presenting under the name Mr Roy. North's stint on the show ran from 1973 to 1976, with him featuring from series 8-11.

After leaving Basil Brush, he hosted the ITV children's music show Get It Together, with Linda Fletcher and later Megg Nichol from 1976 to 1982 and appeared on Seaside Special and other shows. In 2004, he guest starred in the Doctor Who audio adventure, "The Axis of Insanity".

== Personal life ==
North is a Hull City fan. To reflect his love for the team, he would occasionally wear the club's home shirt on television.
