= The Vipers Skiffle Group =

UK musical group

The Vipers Skiffle Group – later known simply as The Vipers – were one of the leading British groups during the skiffle period of the mid to late 1950s, and were important in the careers of radio and television presenter Wally Whyton, coffee bar manager Johnny Martyn, wire salesman Jean Van den Bosch, instrument repairer Tony Tolhurst, journalist John Pilgrim, record producer George Martin, and several members of The Shadows.

== History ==
The group formed in the spring of 1956 in central London, originally as a trio of singer-guitarists comprising Whyton, Johnny Martyn (born John Martyn Booker, 1934–2007), and Jean Van den Bosch, who was replaced in 1958 by Freddy Lloyd. Later that summer they added a rhythm section, Tony Tolhurst (bass) and John Pilgrim (washboard), and took up residency at the renowned Soho music venue, the 2i's Coffee Bar. There, they sometimes jammed with jazz musician Mike Pratt and singer Tommy Hicks, later known as Tommy Steele. In September 1956 they were offered an audition with George Martin at Parlophone Records, and won a recording contract.

Their second single, "Don't You Rock Me Daddy-O", produced by Martin, reached number 10 in the UK Singles Chart in early 1957. Although the songwriting credits were given to Whyton, the song is a variant of the folk standard "Sail Away Ladies", as recorded by Uncle Dave Macon in the 1920s. In the same year they released their version of "Maggie May", which was banned from BBC Radio because of its sexual content, despite the group's attempt to minimise the bawdiness of the lyrics.

The group came into direct competition with Lonnie Donegan on the rival Pye label, who imitated Whyton's arrangements but had the bigger hits, both with "Don't You Rock Me Daddy-O" and with its follow-up "Cumberland Gap". However, the Vipers' version of the latter song again made the UK Top 10, and was followed by their last chart hit, "Streamline Train". Significantly, Martin later commented that working with the Vipers gave him important experience in working with informally trained (Whyton being a skilled trad jazz trombonist), but enthusiastic group of musicians.

The Vipers Skiffle Group continued to record, and for a time were one of the biggest stage attractions among British groups and were second only to Donegan in terms of their skiffle based success. Whyton and Booker also made an album released in the U.S. called The Original Soho Skiffle Group, a showcase for traditional folk and blues music, with sleeve notes by Nat Hentoff. However, by 1958 the skiffle craze was over, and the Vipers dropped the "Skiffle Group" designation from their name.

As The Vipers, the group at one point added Hank Marvin, Jet Harris and Tony Meehan, who would go on to form The Shadows. However, the group finally disintegrated when their recording contract ran out in 1960. Whyton later moved on to a successful career as a radio and television presenter.

In 1999, Paul McCartney covered the Vipers' "No Other Baby" (written by Bob Watson and Dickie Bishop) in his retrospective covers album, Run Devil Run.
