= Clapperboard (TV series) =

British children's TV series (1972–1982)

- Genre: Children's television series
- Presented by: Chris Kelly
- Country of origin: United Kingdom
- Original language: English
- No. of episodes: Approx 470

Production
- Producer: Muriel Young
- Running time: 25 minutes

Original release
- Network: ITV
- Release: 14 April 1972 – 1 January 1982

Clapperboard is a 1970s children's television programme hosted by Chris Kelly, which covered film and television production. The show was made by Granada Television for the ITV network and ran for 254 episodes. It was produced by Muriel Young and broadcast between April 1972 and January 1982. Young herself fronted the show on occasions when Kelly was unavailable.
