= Chris Kelly (TV presenter) =

English TV presenter, producer and writer

Christopher Paul Kelly is an English TV presenter, a producer and a writer.

== Education ==
Kelly was born in 1940 at Cuddington in Cheshire. He was educated at Downside School, a Catholic independent school in Stratton-on-the-Fosse in Somerset, followed by Clare College, Cambridge.

== Career ==
Kelly worked as a continuity announcer for Anglia Television in 1963 before embarking on a career as a presenter.

He was the presenter of Wish You Were Here...?, Food and Drink and Clapperboard. His network television credits include Zoo Time, in succession to Desmond Morris, Sixth Form Challenge, The Royal Film Performance, The Royal Academy Summer Exhibition, I've Got a Secret, Kelly vision, Anything You Can Do, Vintage Quiz, Cinema and Quisine. As well as co-presenting World in Action for a season, he was the programme's principal off-screen narrator for many years. Regionally he worked for Anglia, where he wrote and presented an arts program Folio, and Tyne Tees where he co-presented the first regular ninety-minute live program on British television, Friday Live.

Following the success of "The Zero Option", a two-hour screenplay he originated and co-wrote for Central, a thirteen-part series Saracen, was transmitted. Kelly wrote two episodes. He produced series one and two of Soldier Soldier for Central, the first of which won the Gold Award for Best Drama Series at the 1992 Houston International Film Festival. His career as a TV producer has also included A Line in the Sand, Monsignor Renard, Without Motive and Kavanagh QC.

He is the former owner of the Midsummer House restaurant in Cambridge. Kelly has also written several books. The Telebook, Kellyvision (winner Silver Medal, New York Festival of Film and Television), and four novels: The War of Covent Garden, Forest of the Night, Taking Leave and A Suit of Lights.

== Publications ==
- 1986 – The Telebook (Oxford University Press. ISBN 978-0-19-273156-2)
- 1990 – The War of Covent Garden (Oxford University Press. ISBN 0-19-271569-0)
- 1991 – The Forest of the Night (Oxford University Press. ISBN 0 19 2716387)
- 1995 – Taking Leave (Hodder & Stoughton. ISBN 0-340-61743-8)
- 2000 – A Suit of Lights (Hodder & Stoughton. ISBN 0-340-68213-2)
