= Shang-a-Lang (TV series) =

1975 British children's television pop music series

- Directed by: Dave Warwick; Mike Mansfield
- Starring: Bay City Rollers: Eric Faulkner; Derek Longmuir; Leslie McKeown; Stuart "Woody" Wood; Alan Longmuir; Big Jim Sullivan; Him and Us Dancers
- Country of origin: United Kingdom
- No. of episodes: 20

Production
- Producer: Muriel Young
- Running time: 25 minutes (including a commercial break)
- Production company: Granada Television

Original release
- Network: ITV
- Release: 1 April – 25 December 1975

Related
- The Krofft Superstar Hour

Shang-a-Lang is a children's pop music television series starring the Scottish band, the Bay City Rollers. It was produced in Manchester by Granada Television for the ITV network and ran for a twenty-week series in 1975.

It featured the band in comedy sketches and performing their songs to a live studio audience made up of their teenage fans. This resulted in chaotic scenes at times as some members of the audience attempted to run onto the studio floor to meet their heroes, resulting in security officers having to forcibly restrain or even eject them from the studio.

Guest stars performing their latest releases and hits included Cliff Richard, Marc Bolan, Lynsey de Paul, Lulu, David Cassidy, Linda Lewis, Gary Glitter, Olivia Newton-John, Slade, Sparks, Alvin Stardust, Showaddywaddy, The Rubettes, Alan Price and Gilbert O'Sullivan and The Marionettes.

The show's theme song "Shang-a-Lang", was a hit single for the group, peaking at number two in 1974 in the UK Singles Chart.
