= Five O'Clock Club =

1960s British children's television programme

Five O'Clock Club is a 1960s British children's television entertainment programme on Associated-Rediffusion. It ran twice-weekly between 1963 and 1966 and presented quizzes, hobby items and pop music performances with guests that included Billy Fury, The Spencer Davis Group and The Kinks, among others.

It featured Jimmy Hanley, Muriel Young, Howard Williams, and later Wally Whyton. The programme also had appearances by Bert Weedon, and Grahame Dangerfield, and two glove puppets; Fred and Ollie, full names Ollie Beak and Fred Barker.
