= Wally Whyton =

British musician (1929–1997)

- Born: Wallace Victor Whiten; 23 September 1929; London, England, United Kingdom
- Died: 22 January 1997 (aged 67)
- Occupations: Musician; songwriter; radio and television personality
- Formerly of: Vipers Skiffle Group

Wallace Victor "Wally" Whyton (23 September 1929 – 22 January 1997) was a British musician, songwriter and radio and TV personality.

== Biography ==
Whyton was born in London, England, and grew up listening to jazz, blues and folk music, and learned to play first the piano, then trombone, and finally guitar. In 1956, while working in advertising, he formed the Vipers Skiffle Group, which became the resident band at the 2i's Coffee Bar in Soho, London. After a number of hit records produced by George Martin, including Whyton's song "Don't You Rock Me Daddy-O", the group split up in 1960, and Whyton moved into television work.

Photogenic and with a soft-spoken voice, Whyton normally wore a cardigan as he presented the children's programmes, Small Time, Lucky Dip, Tuesday Rendezvous (on which The Beatles made their second television appearance, performing "Love Me Do"), Five O'Clock Club, Ollie and Fred's Five O'Clock Club and Five O'Clock Funfair for Associated-Rediffusion and Rediffusion London. Whyton normally performed a song while playing his guitar on the children's shows. He was also a presenter on the BBC's Play School (1966) and Play Away (1973).

Subsequently, he was the host of Granada TV's Time for a Laugh. From the 1960s to the 1990s he was a presenter on BBC Radio 2, mainly fronting folk and country music programmes. One of these was Hello Folk and another Country Club. In the 1970s Hello Folk was rebroadcast (coming live from London on tape) on BFBS. In 1976, he toured Germany, visiting the Forces Folk clubs presenting The McCalmans and Mike Harding.

Despite his busy schedule as a broadcaster, Whyton continued to find time to record. As well as recording an album of Woody Guthrie songs, Children's Songs of Woody Guthrie, he wrote and recorded the conservation anthem, Leave Them a Flower. The song was translated into Dutch for Flemish singer Louis Neefs who recorded it as "Laat ons een bloem". His version became one of the biggest hits of his career and remains a favourite song in various 'all-time' lists of best Flemish songs ever recorded. In February 2022, "Laat ons een bloem" finished ninth in the BeNe Top 1000, a list of 1000 best songs originating from the Netherlands and (Flemish) Belgium, as voted for by listeners of Flemish Radio 2.

Meanwhile, Whyton also recorded an album titled Growing Up with Wally Whyton including medleys of songs for children.

The cover of Whyton's It's Me, Mum! appeared on Steve Carter's 'Worst Album Covers Ever Created'.

Whyton presented a regular show for the BBC World Service until a few weeks before his death from lung cancer in January 1997.

One of the songs from the Vipers days, based on the traditional Liverpool tune Maggie May but credited to Whyton, is featured twice in Nowhere Boy, a 2010 film based on the childhood experiences of the Beatles' singer and songwriter John Lennon.

=== It's Me Mum ===
It's Me, Mum! (Fontana, STL5476) was released in 1968 and featured Whyton playing 12-string guitar and singing contemporary and traditional folk songs from the United States, an old music-hall song, and a couple of his own songs: "Selma, Alabama (April 1965)", and "When Winter Comes". Also appearing were John Mark (guitar), Phil Bates (bass) and Terry Cox (drums).

- Track listing:
  - Side 1
- "Gentle on My Mind" (John Hartford)
- "Ballad of the Boll Weavil" (trad. arr Whyton)
- "Little Red Hen" (Malvina Reynolds)
- "Don't Send My Mother to Prison" (tune by Whyton, words by Geoffries/Jones)
- "Tomorrow Is a Long Time" (Bob Dylan)
- "The Urge for Going" (Joni Mitchell)
- "1913 Massacre" (Woody Guthrie)
  - Side 2
- "San Francisco Bay Blues" (Jesse Fuller)
- "Greenback Dollar" (Hoyt Axton)
- "When Winter Comes" (Whyton)
- "900 Miles from Home" (trad. arr Whyton)
- "Underground Train" (Egbert Moore)
- "Leaving on a Jet Plane" (John Denver)
- "Selma, Alabama (April 1965)" (Whyton)

=== Leave Them a Flower ===
Leave Them a Flower (Flying Dutchman/Amsterdam, AM-12010) was released in 1971.

- Track listing:
  - Side 1
- "Leave Them a Flower" (Whyton)
- "This is the Life" (Whyton)
- "The Rich and the Poor" (Whyton)
- "The Auction" (Whyton)
- "1913 Massacre" (Woody Guthrie)
- "Little Red Hen" (Malvina Reynolds)
  - Side 2
- "San Francisco Bay Blues" (Whyton)
- "Selma, Alabama (April 1965)" (Hoyt Axton)
- "When Winter Comes" (Whyton)
- "Banks of Marble" (Les Rice)
- "It's All Over Now Baby Blue" (Bob Dylan)
- "Bound For Borstal" (Whyton)

Discogs.com lists 11 other albums, most being songs for children.
