= List of ITV journalists and newsreaders =

British media personnel

As the oldest commercial television network in the UK, ITV has employed many journalists and newsreaders to present its news programmes as well as to provide news reports and interviews during its history.

Since the ITV network began, Independent Television News Limited (ITN) has held the contract to produce national and international news for it. Meanwhile, the regional ITV stations have provided local news programmes tailored for regional audiences.

== A ==
- Christa Ackroyd – presenter on Calendar during the 1990s; she left to join the BBC's Look North.
- Kaye Adams – journalist on Central Television; later presenter on Scottish TV.
- Jonathan Aitken – presenter on Yorkshire Television's Calendar from 1968 until 1970: he was the first person to be seen on screen when the station launched. He later participated in the relaunch of TV-am in 1983, but he is best known as a Conservative politician, originally for Thanet from 1974 and later for South Thanet.
- Antoine Allen – host for ITV Tonight, ITV News London late bulletins, Good Morning Britain London early bulletins, ITV News reporter
- Sameena Ali-Khan – presenter on ITV Central; presented the ITV Weekend News on occasions in 2006
- Eamonn Andrews – main presenter of Thames Television's Today programme during the 1960s and 1970s. He was also a sports presenter and commentator, and was the first-ever presenter of ITV's World of Sport, but he was best known as the host of This Is Your Life, Crackerjack and What's My Line? He died in 1987.
- Jo Andrews – former political correspondent and Deputy Political Editor at ITN
- Fiona Armstrong – presenter for Border Television's regional news programme Lookaround; later a newscaster on ITN's News at Ten
- Pamela Armstrong – ITN newscaster, 1983–1986.
- Toni Arthur – occasional presenter on TV-am during the 1980s. She is best known as a presenter on the BBC children's series Playschool and Play Away during the 1970s.
- Mark Austin – former main presenter of ITV Evening News and ITV News at Ten; since joining ITN (on ITV) in 1986, having previously worked on BBC news programmes; has specialised in a variety of roles including sports reporter, foreign correspondent, and then newscaster for Channel 4 News
- Lisa Aziz – former co-presenter for ITV Westcountry and news presenter on TV-am

== B ==
- Zeinab Badawi – first presenter of the ITV News at 5:30 and co-presented Channel 4 News for several years, before joining BBC News
- Llewella Bailey
- Faye Barker – main newscaster for ITV News London at 5:30, January 2009 – December 2012; continues to work with ITN across ITV London and ITV News output
- Carol Barnes – worked for ITN, 1975–2004, as both reporter and newscaster; died in March 2008
- Felicity Barr – first female sports correspondent for ITV News in 2001
- Martin Bashir – left BBC in 1999 to join ITV, working on special documentary programmes and features for Tonight. He rejoined the BBC in 2016 as their Religious Affairs Correspondent.
- Seán Batty – meteorologist, currently working for STV
- Andrea Benfield – journalist and presenter, ITV News: Wales at Six
- Alex Beresford – weather presenter and journalist on ITV Breakfast programme Daybreak and later on Good Morning Britain
- Sangeeta Bhabra – journalist and presenter, ITV Meridian
- Sally Biddulph – reporter and newsreader at ITV News Central and political correspondent for Thames Valley Tonight in Westminster; joined ITN in 2009 as news correspondent, political correspondent and presenter on ITV News at 5:30, ITV News at 1:30 and ITV News Saturday prime-time bulletins; newsreader for ITV News London since 2014.
- David Bobin – sports presenter and reporter for Westward Television, TVS and Meridian Television. He was also a main anchor on TVS's Coast To Coast. He died in 2017.
- Reginald Bosanquet – best known for presenting ITN bulletins in the 1970s; joined ITN at its start in 1955 as a sub-editor; later reported from many parts of the world and was the diplomatic correspondent for four years; held the 'head anchor' title at ITN between 1974 and 1976, in the absence of Alastair Burnet; died in 1984; son of the cricketer Bernard Bosanquet, who famously invented the 'googly'.
- Adam Boulton – political editor for TV-am during the 1980s. He later joined Sky News
- Tom Bradby – ITV News' political editor, July 2005 – October 2015; joined ITN as an editorial trainee in 1990 and subsequently became producer for Michael Brunson, ITN's political editor, in 1992; Ireland correspondent 1993–1996; Asia correspondent 1999–2001; then Royal correspondent for ITV News; subsequently became UK editor before taking up the post of political editor; gave up his position as political editor in October 2015 to become sole anchor of ITV News at Ten
- Colin Brazier – reporter on ITV
- Fern Britton – television presenter, former co-anchor of the Southampton edition of TVS local news programme Coast To Coast, best known as co-presenter for ITV magazine programme This Morning, 1999–2009
- Antony Brown (born 1922) – newsreader in the 1950s and 1960s. Announced the assassination of President Kennedy. Co-author of historical fiction with Norman MacKenzie under the joint pseudonym 'Anthony Forrest'. He died in 2001. He was the father of the BBC News presenter Ben Brown.
- Michael Brunson – Washington correspondent and diplomatic editor of ITN; best known for serving as the political editor between 1986 and 2000 and as an occasional ITN newscaster
- Lynda Bryans – weekend newscaster on UTV Live, 2001–2005
- Kay Burley – newsreader, reporter and occasional main presenter on TV-am from 1985 until 1988. She left to join the then-fledgling Sky News.
- Sir Alastair Burnet – main presenter of News at Ten and ITN election programmes from the early 1960s until his retirement in 1991; held the 'head anchor' title at ITN from 1967 (the year News at Ten was launched) until 1991, except between 1972 and 1976 when he presented for the BBC and became editor of the Daily Express; knighted as a Knight Bachelor in early 1984; died in July 2012.
- Gordon Burns – joined Ulster Television in his native Belfast in 1967 as a sports presenter, later presenting the station's flagship programme UTV Reports. He then moved to Granada Television, where he presented Granada Reports and also worked on World In Action in the 1970s, but he is best known as the long-serving host of Granada's prestigious quiz The Krypton Factor from 1977 until 1995. He joined BBC North West in 1997, becoming the main anchor on North West Tonight until his retirement in 2011.
- Andrea Byrne

== C ==
- Andrea Catherwood – former main presenter for ITV's weekend news bulletins; joined ITN in April 1998, starting as a newscaster and senior reporter; in these early years, she also presented the ITN Morning News and filed special reports for News at Ten; became medical correspondent; left ITN in September 2006 to front the short-lived political programme The Sunday Edition
- David Chater – award-winning former ITN international correspondent; joined Sky News in 1993
- Christopher Chataway
- Ros Childs
- Paul Clark – UTV Live presenter
- Paul Coia – first-ever continuity announcer on Channel 4 in 1982. He had previously been a continuity announcer for Scottish Television, and has since presented a number of TV and radio programmes, including the BBC's Pebble Mill At One and Catchword. He is married to fellow-broadcaster Debbie Greenwood.
- Stephen Cole – reporter for Central Television, Anglia Television's About Anglia and ITN
- Brian Connell – ITN newscaster during the late 1950s and early 1960s. He died in 1999.
- Dominic Cotton
- Bob Crampton – long-serving presenter and weather forecaster on ITV1 West, formerly HTV West, from 1983 until his retirement in 2018
- Sarah Cullen – former ITN Home Affairs correspondent

== D ==
- Anne Dawson
- Robin Day – worked for ITN from 1955, the first British journalist to interview Egypt's President Nasser after the Suez Crisis. Later moved to the BBC. He died in 2000.
- Jamie Delargy
- Katie Derham – former media/arts editor and newscaster for ITV News; presented the ITV Lunchtime News and London Tonight, both produced by ITN; relief presenter for the ITV Evening News and ITV News at Ten; left ITN in June 2010
- Anne Diamond – hosted Good Morning Britain for TV-am, which lost its license in 1992; began her television career starting with ATV Today and Central News
- Fred Dinenage – television host and newsreader, based in the south of England; has appeared as presenter of many British television programmes, including World of Sport, and quiz shows, such as Tell The Truth, Gambit and Pass The Buck, and the children's series How. Most of these were produced by Southern Television and its successors TVS and Meridian Broadcasting; however, Dinenage has also worked for the BBC on occasions. He was a presenter on ITV Meridian between 1983 and 2021.
- Steve Dixon
- Stephen Douglas
- Murray Dron

== E ==
- Sara Edwards
- Tom Edwards (broadcaster) – presenter and announcer on Thames Television during the 1980s. He was also an announcer on HTV West and ATV during this period. He died in 2025.
- Julie Etchingham – co-presenter of ITV News at Ten from January 2008
- Sherrie Eugene – regular presenter and sign language interpreter on HTV News West, and later The West Tonight, 1982–2001

== F ==
- Peter Fairley – science editor for Independent Television News and TV Times magazine in the late 1960s and early 1970s. He died in 1998.
- Mimi Fawaz – former presenter and producer at ITV News
- Judy Finnigan – originally a researcher at Granada Television from 1971, she joined Anglia Television in 1974 as its first female reporter. She returned to Granada in 1980 as a reporter and presenter on Granada Reports. She is best known for presenting This Morning from its inception in 1988 until 2001, then Richard and Judy on Channel 4 from 2001 until 2008, both of these alongside her husband, Richard Madeley.
- Anna Ford – initially worked as a researcher, news reporter and later newsreader at Granada Television; became a newsreader with ITN, and later helped launch ITV's first breakfast television service, TV-am
- Fiona Foster
- Matt Frei – Europe editor for Channel 4 News, and former presenter of BBC World News America
- David Frost – one of the original presenters of TV-am on its launch in 1983. He then presented 'Frost on Sunday' until 1992, before moving to the BBC to present Breakfast with Frost, which ran from 1993 until 2005. He died in 2013.

== G ==
- Steve Gaisford
- Sandy Gall – long-serving former ITN foreign correspondent and news presenter. He died in 2025.
- Andrew Gardner – presented the first News at Ten with Alastair Burnet in 1967; following his retirement from ITN, he worked on Thames Television during the 1980s; died in 1999
- Kate Garraway – currently presents Good Morning Britain; previously Daybreak and GMTV
- Neil Garrett
- Martin Geissler – Africa correspondent for ITV News since May 2006; joined ITV News in April 2002 from STV Central's regional news programme Scotland Today, where he was a news reporter and presenter.
- Shiulie Ghosh – senior correspondent, Home Affairs Editor and presenter for ITV News, 1998–2006.
- Elinor Goodman – long-serving reporter for Channel 4 News. She joined the programme as a political correspondent on its inception in 1982, later becoming the programme's Political Editor, a role she held from 1988 until 2005. She also occasionally reported for ITN.
- Bob Greaves – long-serving presenter, reporter and producer for Granada Television. He originally joined the company in 1964 as a reporter on 'Scene', then as the main anchor for 'Newscene' and Granada Reports until his retirement in 1999. He died in 2011.
- Mary Green
- Anne Gregg – reporter and presenter on Ulster Television's Roundabout; also worked for Anglia Television; later co-presented the BBC's Holiday programme during the 1980s; died in 2006
- Bill Grundy
- Krishnan Guru-Murthy – presenter for Channel 4 News since 1998

== H ==
- Simon Hall
- Will Hanrahan – presenter of Serve You Right for Meridian TV
- Gerry Harrison – in 1985 took over as Head of Sport at Anglia TV; left in 1993
- Andrew Harvey – presenter on the ITN News Channel with Lucy Alexander; moved on to his own programme after breakfast, Live with Andrew Harvey
- Julian Haviland – ITN political editor, 1975–1981, before becoming the political editor for The Times. He died in 2023.
- Barbara Blake Hannah – Barbara Blake-Hannah is a Jamaican journalist, politician, author, film maker, festival organiser and cultural consultant
- Dominic Heale – former presenter of Central News East, later moved to the BBC to present East Midlands Today.
- Alistair Hignell – sports presenter and reporter on HTV News West during the 1990s.
- Gerald Hine-Haycock – known by his then-broadcasting name Gerald Haycock; left ITN in 1981, to report for and present HTV News at HTV West, followed by BBC Points West at BBC West. He died in 2023.
- Derek Hobson – ATV continuity announcer and presenter of ATV Today during the 1970s; hosted quizzes, such as New Faces, That's My Dog and Jeopardy!
- Alison Holloway – worked initially as an announcer for Westward Television before joining HTV West, where she worked as an announcer and main presenter on HTV News during the 1980s.
- Eamonn Holmes – presenter on Ulster Television's Good Evening Ulster, 1982–1986; presented GMTV, 1993–2005; hosted a number of quiz and game shows; currently a regular presenter on This Morning
- Gordon Honeycombe – newscaster at ITN, 1965–1977; twice voted the most popular newscaster in Britain, by readers of the Daily Mirror and of The Sun; returned to regular newsreading, 1984–1989, as chief newsreader at TV-am, becoming Britain's longest-serving ITV newscaster; died in 2015
- Nina Hossain – main newscaster on ITV Lunchtime News and ITV News London since 2010; regular relief newscaster on all main ITV News bulletins since 2004
- Robin Houston – main newscaster of lunchtime and late Thames News bulletins, 1978-1992
- Gloria Hunniford – presenter on Ulster Television's Good Evening Ulster, 1979–1982; became a chat show host with her own Sunday Sunday, and a quiz show host and panellist; now presents Rip Off Britain for the BBC; mother of the late Caron Keating, a presenter on Blue Peter and This Morning
- Alex Hyndman – freelance newscaster and reporter on ITV News London and ITV News weekend bulletins

== I ==
- John Irvine – ITN's Washington correspondent; before joining ITN in 1994 as a Northern Ireland correspondent, worked for UTV News.
- Jayne Irving – worked on Good Morning Britain from 1983 until 1986, originally reading the news bulletins, then as a main anchor. She left to join the BBC, where she presented Open Air from 1986 until 1990.

== J ==
- Catherine Jacob – editorial trainee at ITN from September 2000; news presenter for Granada Reports and ITV News Tyne Tees in 2013
- Becky Jago – news presenter at ITV Anglia
- Peter Jay – main presenter of Weekend World from 1972–77, he then became the founding chairman of TV AM in 1983. He later joined the BBC. He died in 2024.
- Sally Jones (journalist) – reporter for Westward Television, later becoming a main co-presenter on Central News during the early 1980s – she also reported for ITN during this period. She left to join BBC Breakfast in 1986 and became a Real Tennis world champion in 1993 – she also won the British and US Open Championships

== K ==
- Natasha Kaplinsky – joined ITV to present ITN News in 2011
- Robert Kee – anchor for ITN's first lunchtime bulletin First Report, 1972–1976. He was also one of the first presenters of TV-am in 1983. He died in 2013.
- Chris Kelly (TV presenter) – joined Anglia Television in 1963 as a continuity announcer; he later became a narrator and co-presenter on World In Action. He is best known as a presenter on Wish You Were Here...? alongside Judith Chalmers, on the BBC's Food and Drink and on the children's film review series Clapperboard.
- Lorraine Kelly – started as a reporter for Scottish Television; came to national attention by reporting on the Piper Alpha oil rig disaster in 1988. She has since presented Good Morning Britain, GMTV and Daybreak, and continues to host her own show Lorraine to this day.
- Martin Kelner
- Kenneth Kendall – presenter on Southern Television's flagship news programme 'Day By Day' from 1961 until 1969: he also occasionally worked for ITN during this period. He had originally worked for the BBC, having been their first-ever in-vision newsreader in 1955, and he returned there in 1969, continuing in the same role until his retirement in 1981. He later became the main presenter on the Channel 4 quiz Treasure Hunt and he also presented the BBC's Songs of Praise. He died in 2012.
- Ludovic Kennedy – newscaster and reporter during ITN's early years. He was knighted for his services to journalism in 1994. He died in 2009. He was married to the actress and dancer Moira Shearer.
- Richard Keys – presenter on TV-am from 1984 until 1990. He left to join Sky Sports as a presenter and commentator and has worked in sports broadcasting ever since.
- Lucy Kite – news presenter and producer on Central Tonight for ITV Central from 2002; entertainment correspondent from January 2006; from November 2008, appointed relief presenter on West Midlands edition of Central.
- Redvers Kyle – long-serving continuity announcer, originally for Associated-Rediffusion, from 1956 until 1968: he then worked as Chief Announcer for Yorkshire Television from 1968 until 1993. He continued to work as a freelance announcer for YTV, as well as Tyne Tees Television, until 1998. He died in 2015.

== L ==
- Alastair Layzell – produced and directed documentaries for ITV network including Summer 1940, the story of the German occupation of the Channel Islands
- Stephen Lee
- Jan Leeming – presenter and reporter for Westward Television during the 1960s and a presenter on HTV News West during the 1970s, before becoming a newsreader for the BBC
- Martyn Lewis – news presenter for HTV and then ITN, where he was a regular presenter for News at Ten; joined the BBC in 1986 to front the new One O'Clock News.
- Peter Lewis (announcer) – continuity announcer for London Weekend Television from its inception in 1968 until his departure in 1997: he became their chief announcer in 1977. He was also an announcer for Yorkshire Television and HTV West, and he was a regular newsreader on 'London News Headlines' for LWT from 1982 until 1988.
- Terry Lloyd – Middle East reporter; killed by US troops in 2003 while covering the 2003 Invasion of Iraq
- Jasmine Lowson

== M ==
- Hamish MacDonald – reporter for ITV
- Donal MacIntyre – presenter on ITV's London Tonight
- Robert MacNeil
- Richard Madeley – reporter on Border Television's Lookaround and presenter on Yorkshire Television's Calendar during the 1970s, before moving onto Granada Reports in the early 1980s. He is best known for presenting This Morning from its inception in 1988 until 2001, then Richard and Judy on Channel 4 from 2001 until 2008, both of these alongside his wife, Judy Finnigan.
- Joanne Malin
- Marc Mallett
- Barbara Mandell – first female newsreader in Britain, presenting ITN bulletins from 1956 to the late 1960s; died in 1998
- Penny Marshall – ITV News Africa Correspondent, September 2019 – Present. ITV News Social Affairs Editor until September 2019.
- Peter Marshall (UK broadcaster) – long-serving continuity announcer, originally for Ulster Television during the late 1960s. He then worked for Anglia Television, Southern Television, HTV West, ATV, and for Thames Television in particular: he began announcing for the latter company in 1976 and remained with them until their final day of broadcasting in 1992.
- James Mates – ITV News Europe Editor; relief newscaster for ITV News at 1:30, ITV News at 6:30 and ITV News at Ten; main newscaster for ITV News on Sundays
- Daisy McAndrew
- Jodie McCallum – presenter of FYI Daily
- Helen McDermott – television presenter, best known for her work at Anglia Television
- Trevor McDonald – ITN newscaster, 1973–2008; first black news anchor in the UK; joined ITN as a reporter in 1973 and rose to become a newscaster by the late 1970s; in the mid-1980s was diplomatic editor for Channel 4 News; main newscaster for News at Ten, 1992–1999 and 2001–2005; during this period he also hosted Granada Television's current affairs programme Tonight with Trevor McDonald; retired from newscasting in 2005, but returned to ITN to present the revived News at Ten for eleven months in 2008; knighted in 1999
- Mark McFadden
- Lawrence McGinty – former Science and Medical Editor for ITN
- Lucy Meacock – presenter of Granada Reports
- Guy Michelmore – reporter on Anglia TV's About Anglia, 1983–1993; son of the late Cliff Michelmore
- Lucrezia Millarini – presenter and reporter
- Austin Mitchell – main presenter on Yorkshire Television's Calendar from 1969 until 1977. He then became best known as the Labour MP for Great Grimsby, a role he held from 1977 until 2015. He died in 2021.
- Ed Mitchell – reporter on ITN News
- Frank Mitchell
- Leslie Mitchell – senior announcer for Associated-Rediffusion from 1955 until 1958. He had previously been the first-ever announcer on the then-fledgling BBC Television in 1936. He died in 1985.
- Saima Mohsin
- Kristina Moore
- Diana Moran – former newsreader and announcer for HTV News West. She is best known as 'The Green Goddess', the resident fitness expert on BBC Breakfast Time from 1983 until 1987.
- Chris Morgan (journalist) – reporter for Thames News and TV-am during the 1990s, having previously been a main presenter on the BBC's Wales Today. He died in 2008.
- Emily Morgan (journalist) – health and science editor at ITV News. She died in 2023.
- Jonathan Morrell
- Mike Morris – main anchor on Good Morning Britain during the 1980s and early 1990s; previously worked for Thames News; later worked on GMTV; main anchor on Calendar, 1996–2002; died in 2012
- Tony Morris – presenter of Granada Reports for more than 10 years from 2003. He died in 2020.
- Dermot Murnaghan
- Emma Murphy – correspondent. Served as Europe Correspondent for ITV News and then Foreign Correspondent. In September 2020 it was announced that Murphy would take over as US Correspondent in early 2021.

== N ==
- Jennifer Nadel – ITN's Home Affairs Editor, 1994–1999
- Shereen Nanjiani
- Nina Nannar
- Melissa Nathoo – presenter of FYI Daily
- Bill Neely – joined ITN in 1989, was Washington Correspondent for 6 years, Europe Correspondent for 5, International Editor for 12; covered many events including the fall of the Berlin Wall, break-up of the Soviet Union, both Gulf Wars, and September 11 attacks; left in 2014 to join NBC News
- Mike Neville – joined Tyne Tees Television in 1959 as a young reporter; later became presenter of regional news programme before leaving for the BBC; returned to ITV in 1996 with his own programme on Tyne Tees until 2005. He died in 2017.
- Gary Newbon
- Jonny Nelson – presenter of FYI Daily
- Jeremy Nicholas
- Michael Nicholson – former ITN senior foreign correspondent and newscaster; original host of ITN News at 5:45 when it was introduced in 1976; died in December 2016
- Nicol Nicolson
- Mary Nightingale – main newscaster on ITV Evening News; joined ITV News in January 2001 and has since presented both the 6:30 pm bulletin as well as special ITN programmes on ITV

== O ==
- Glen Oglaza
- Joyce Ohajah
- Rageh Omaar – joined ITV News in 2013 after being a newsreader on Al Jazeera English and a columnist for BBC News
- Lucy Owen
- Nicholas Owen – joined ITN in 1984 as Channel 4 News' business and economics correspondent; ITN's royal correspondent, 1994–2000; in 2003, he became the main presenter of ITV News at 1:30; left ITN in 2006 for the BBC, where he is currently a relief presenter for the BBC News at Six, as well as a main presenter on the BBC News Channel, and a radio presenter on Classic FM.
- Nick Owen – presenter on TV-am and Good Morning Britain during the 1980s. He had previously worked for ATV as a presenter and sports reporter. He later hosted Sporting Triangles and Good Morning with Anne and Nick, the latter with his former TV-am co-presenter Anne Diamond. He is now the main anchor for the BBC's Midlands Today.

== P ==
- Shahnaz Pakravan – presenter on Channel 4 News and The Channel Four Daily during the 1980s and 1990s.
- Leonard Parkin – reporter and newscaster with ITN from circa 1973 to 1987; between 1976 and 1987 he was one of the main presenters for ITN's News at One; often hosted the News at 5:45 in the early 1980s; occasionally presented News at Ten; and retired in 1987; subsequently presented documentaries for Yorkshire Television until his death in 1993.
- Michael Parkinson – one of the original presenters of TV-am on its inception in 1983. He is best known as a chat show host, having hosted his own BBC show Parkinson from 1971 until 1982: he later presented a revival, from 1998 until 2007. Other shows he has presented have included Give Us A Clue and Desert Island Discs. He was knighted in 2008. He died in 2023.
- Matthew Parris – former Conservative MP, who presented Weekend World from 1986 to 1988
- Roger Parry
- Andrew Pate – journalist and presenter, ITV Meridian
- Ian Payne – lead news anchor of ITV News Border
- Kylie Pentelow
- Robert Peston – ITV News' Political Editor since January 2016, replacing Tom Bradby; formerly BBC News' Business and Economics Editor.
- Karen Petch – continuity announcer for Yorkshire Television and Tyne Tees Television during the 1990s. She then became a main presenter and reporter on Yorkshire's Calendar. She died from cancer in 2019.
- Fiona Phillips – main anchor on GMTV, presented GMTV Today, 1997–2008
- Ronke Phillips – senior correspondent, newscaster
- John Pilger – journalist on World In Action, 1969-1971. He died in 2023.
- Amanda Piper – journalist and presenter, ITV Meridian
- Eve Pollard
- Mike Prince – continuity announcer for ATV and its successor, Central Independent Television, during the 1970s and 1980s.

== R ==
- Gaby Rado – journalist who died in Iraq during the 2003 invasion; joined BBC News as a radio reporter, then ITN in 1985 as a writer for ITV bulletins, before transferring to ITN's Channel 4 News in 1988.
- Jeff Randall – produced television documentaries for ITV.
- Andrew Rawnsley – co-presenter of 'A Week In Politics', alongside Vincent Hanna, during the 1990s.
- Phil Reay-Smith – general correspondent for ITV News until August 2010; now Consumer Editor on ITV Breakfast show Daybreak since its launch in September 2010
- Pam Rhodes – presenter of Anglia Television's About Anglia during the 1970s and 1980s. She is now best known as a long-serving presenter of the BBC's Songs of Praise.
- Steve Rider – sports presenter and anchorman of ITV's football coverage, having previously been a long-serving main anchor on the BBC's Grandstand
- Angela Rippon
- Dan Rivers – international correspondent for ITV News
- Graham Roberts – continuity announcer for Yorkshire Television until his retirement in 1993: he was also an announcer for Grampian Television. He died in 2004.
- Nick Robinson – political editor for ITV News, 2002–2005
- Chris Rogers – presented and reported for ITV News
- Peter Rowell – continuity announcer and daytime newsreader for HTV West from the late 1980s until he left in 2010 to join BBC Radio Bristol. He was jailed in 2012 on historical sexual assault charges.
- Pam Royle – lead news anchor on ITV News Border.
- Sonia Ruseler

== S ==
- Brent Sadler – joined ITN in 1981 as a news reporter, before being promoted to the position of Middle East Correspondent. He left to join CNN in 1991
- Sue Saville - she joined ITN in May 1998, as a news correspondent on ITV News, after five years with GMTV (1993-7), where she was Chief Correspondent, and working as a correspondent for BBC News at Six (1999–2002). She was the medical correspondent for ITV News from 2005, being shortlisted for the Medical Journalism Awards that year.
- Annie St John – announcer for HTV West, Tyne Tees and LWT during the 1980s, and later a main presenter on HTV News West. She died from a drugs overdose in 1990.
- Angus Scott – regular sports presenter for HTV during the 1980s and 1990s: he frequently presented sports news on HTV News. He is the brother of Steve Scott.
- Mike Scott – reporter and presenter on World In Action and Granada's local news programmes: he was the company's programme controller from 1979 until 1987. He was probably best known for hosting The Time, The Place from 1987 until 1993, in rotation with John Stapleton. Scott died in 2008.
- Selina Scott – presenter of Grampian Today; in 1980 moved to ITN to replace Anna Ford on News at Ten; left to present the BBC's Breakfast Time; later co-hosted The Clothes Show
- Steve Scott – sports editor and newscaster for ITV News from ITN; began his television career as Industrial Correspondent with West Tonight on ITV West; joined ITN in 1993. He is married to the former HTV News presenter Patricia Yorston, and is also the brother of Angus Scott.
- Ben Shephard – main presenter on Good Morning Britain since 2014. He was previously a presenter on GMTV and GMTV Today from 2000 until 2010, and he has also hosted quiz shows, including The Krypton Factor, Tipping Point and 1 vs. 100.
- Chris Ship – Royal Editor for ITV News and occasional weekend news presenter
- Peter Sissons – joined ITN in 1964 and became their Industrial Editor after being wounded covering the Nigerian Civil War; became alternate presenter of the News at One in 1976; presented the first edition of Channel 4 News in 1982; left in 1989 to join BBC News. He died in 2019.
- Penny Smith – long-serving newsreader on GMTV, from 1993 until 2010. She had previously been a newsreader on Border Television's Lookaround, on Thames News, and on Sky News at its inception in 1989. She also co-hosted the last series of The Krypton Factor alongside Gordon Burns.
- Jon Snow – journalist and presenter for ITN, best known for presenting Channel 4 News since 1989; cousin of fellow-journalist Peter Snow.
- Peter Snow – joined ITN as a newscaster in 1962, later working as a foreign correspondent and Defence and Diplomatic Correspondent during the 1960s and 1970s. He was also a regular analyst and co-presenter on ITN's election programmes during this period. He joined the BBC in 1979 as the first main anchor of Newsnight, which he presented from 1980 until 1997. During this time, he became especially famous for his use of the Swingometer during the BBC's election coverage. He later co-presented Tomorrow's World and also a number of history programmes, the latter normally with his historian son, Dan Snow. He is also the cousin of fellow-journalist Jon Snow.
- Julia Somerville – joined ITN in 1987 to co-present the Lunchtime News; presenter of ITV News at Ten until it ended in 1999; remained at ITN until October 2001, presenting the ITV News at 1:30 and was the launch newscaster for the ITN News Channel
- Judi Spiers – regular presenter and announcer, initially for Westward Television, then TSW, from 1977 until 1991, when she left to join the BBC.
- Alastair Stewart – main newscaster on ITV Lunchtime News, relief newscaster on ITV Evening News and relief newscaster on ITV News at Ten
- Ian Stirling (broadcaster) – long-serving announcer and presenter on Westward Television, TSW and Westcountry Television. He died in 2005.
- Edward Stourton (journalist) – joined ITN in 1979: he was a founder-member of Channel 4 News and worked in various roles on the programme, including copywriter, producer, duty home news editor and chief sub-editor. He joined the BBC in 1988 as their Paris Correspondent, before returning to ITN as their Diplomatic Editor in 1990. He rejoined the BBC in 1993 to present the One O'Clock News and he later presented the 'Today' programme, he died in 2026
- Janet Street-Porter – joined LWT in 1975; reporter on The London Weekend Show from 1975 until 1979
- John Suchet – newsreader for ITN, 1972–2004; reporter, 1972–1982, when he became a weekend news presenter; main lunchtime presenter, 1987–1992; best known for his presenting the ITV News at 6:30, 1992–1999; during these years he was also a relief presenter for News at Ten; retired from ITN in 2004; brother of the actor David Suchet
- Jonathan Swain – senior news correspondent, Good Morning Britain. Previously a correspondent for GMTV from 2001 and then Daybreak before it was relaunched as Good Morning Britain. From 1996 until 1998 reporter and presenter at Westcountry Television in SW England before joining Central Television.

== T ==
- Christine Talbot
- Chris Tarrant – presenter and reporter on ATV Today from 1964 until 1982. He is best known for having hosted the children's series Tiswas from 1974 until 1981 and the quiz Who Wants to Be a Millionaire? from 1998 until 2014.
- Kathy Tayler – former pentathlete, who presented Good Morning Britain from 1989 until 1992. She was also a regular presenter on the BBC's Holiday for twelve years.
- Alan Taylor (television presenter) – continuity announcer for TWW in his native Cardiff: he began in 1959 and continued in this role throughout the 1960s. He later presented a number of programmes for HTV Wales during the 1970s, as well as quiz shows such as Three Little Words and Mr. & Mrs.. He died in 1997.
- Shaw Taylor – continuity announcer on ATV during its early years. He was best known for presenting the long-running series 'Police 5' and 'Junior Police 5', which appealed to members of the public to watch out for criminals at work, from 1962 until 1992. He died in 2015.
- Matt Teale – currently presents ITV News Meridian and formerly presented ITV News London and ITV News Central.
- Gary Terzza – continuity announcer for Central Independent Television during the early 1980s: he was also a presenter for Children's ITV in 1987 and 1988. He then became a continuity announcer for Channel Four in 1991 and has continued to work there ever since.
- Joan Thirkettle – joined ITN in 1974 as one of their first female reporters; died in 1996
- Huw Thomas – Joined ITN in 1956
- Owen Thomas – worked for many years at ITN, presenting the now defunct ITV News Channel, the networked ITV Morning News and the regional ITV programme London Tonight.
- Alex Thomson (journalist) – long-serving main presenter and reporter on Channel Four News. He joined the programme in 1988 and has worked in various roles, covering more than 20 wars and conflicts and many major news events. He currently works as the programme's Chief Correspondent and Newsreader.
- Glen Thompsett – presenter on ITV region Meridian in the South East England and London Weekend
- Debbie Thrower – presented ITV Meridian's news programme Meridian Tonight (southern edition) from its inception in 1993 to 2009; also a BBC newsreader and a presenter on Songs of Praise
- Philippa Tomson – joined ITV News Central as newsreader in 2002; co-presenter of ITV News Tyne Tees from 2006; joined Good Morning Britain in 2010, where she is a news reporter and occasional newsreader
- Isla Traquair
- Brian Trueman – former reporter and presenter on Granada Reports. He also wrote and narrated various children's cartoon series, including Jamie and the Magic Torch, and he was the presenter on the BBC's children's quiz Screen Test from 1979 until 1983. He died in 2024.
- Denis Tuohy – reporter and newscaster for ITN during the 1990s

== V ==
- Geraint Vincent – political correspondent for HTV's Wales Tonight; joined ITN in April 2002 as a news correspondent for ITV News; presented ITV News at 6:30 and ITV News at Ten; Middle East Correspondent for ITV News

== W ==
- Brian Walden – former Labour MP; presented many current affairs shows such as Weekend World, Walden and The Walden Interview during the 1970s, 1980s and 1990s. He died in 2019.
- Neville Wanless – long-serving continuity announcer and newsreader for Tyne Tees Television from 1971 until 1991. He had previously worked for the BBC's Home Service and he was a stand-in announcer for Border Television during the early 1970s. He died in 2020.
- Bob Warman – long-serving main anchor on ITV's news programmes in the Midlands, including ATV Today and Central News. He also worked as a presenter for Yorkshire Television from 1976 until 1979.
- Mark Webster – former ITN Moscow Correspondent, Business Editor, Political Correspondent and Industrial Correspondent; joined five news in 2004 (when the programme was produced by Sky News).
- Romilly Weeks – employed by ITN to cover events worldwide for ITV News.
- Charlene White – ITV News presenter.
- Stewart White – continuity announcer and presenter on ATV and its successor, Central Independent Television, during the late 1970s and early 1980s. He then became the main presenter on the BBC's Look East in 1984, continuing in this role until his retirement in 2021.
- Richard Whiteley – reporter and presenter for Yorkshire Television's Calendar, 1968–1995; best known for his 23-year stint as presenter of Countdown; died in 2005 following a short illness.
- James Wignall
- Keith Wilkinson – reporter and correspondent for ITV since 1984.
- Tim Willcox – worked for ITN News for many years as a presenter and correspondent.
- Jonathan Wills – in late 2007, joined ITV Anglia to present the East edition of Anglia Tonight; in 2009, he became the main presenter of ITV News Anglia.
- Richard Wyatt – HTV news anchor; presented BBC Radio Bristol's breakfast show, 2007–2009

== Y ==
- Yao Chin – video journalist reporting on the ITV Morning News, 2009–12; joined ITN as an Assistant News Editor and Westminster Producer, having won a scholarship from ITV News for his post-graduate journalism qualification.
- Patricia Yorston – main co-presenter on HTV News West during the late 1980s and early 1990s. She is married to Steve Scott.
- Kirsty Young – joined STV in 1992 to present the main evening news programme, Scotland Today; moved to join ITV in 1999 and briefly became a co-presenter of the ITV News at 6:30 with Dermot Murnaghan in 2001, as well as the Channel 5 News; she later presented Desert Island Discs on BBC Radio 4 from 2006 until 2018.
- Muriel Young – announcer for Associated-Rediffusion on the first-ever night of ITV, 22 September 1955. She also worked as a presenter and interviewer for regional programmes on Granada Television and Southern Television, but she was probably best known for her work on ITV children's programmes. She was a presenter on 'Lucky Dip', 'Tuesday Rendezvous' and 'The Five O'Clock Club', among others, from 1959 until 1968, then she became a staff producer for Granada Television, producing pop shows such as Lift Off with Ayshea, Get It Together and Shang-a-Lang. She also devised the children's film series Clapperboard. She died in 2001.
