= Timeline of Tyne Tees Television =

This is a timeline of the history of the British broadcaster Tyne Tees Television (now known as ITV Tyne Tees). It provides the ITV service for the North East of England.

== 1950s ==
- 1957
  - 12 December – A local consortium, headed by Sir Richard Pease that included film producer Sydney Box and News Chronicle executives George and Alfred Black, sees off ten other applicants when it is awarded the licence to broadcast an ITV service to north east England. It is chosen due to its strong local links, commitment to local programming, concentrating on regional topical matters, and educational and children's programmes.
- 1958
  - October – After the Independent Television Authority (ITA) had considered the original name, "North East England", to be too imprecise and after some of the consortium's suggestions were rejected: "Three Rivers Television" for being obscure, and "Tyne, Wear, and Tees" for being too long, the name "Tyne Tees" is announced.
- 1959
  - 15 January – At 5pm, Tyne Tees Television launches.
  - News Chronicle launches listings magazine The Viewer. It was produced to satisfy " 'Tyne Tees' policy to be most regional of all the independent stations".

== 1960s ==
- 1960
  - No events.
- 1961
  - No events.
- 1962
  - 27 June – Tyne Tees receives significant criticism in the 1962 Pilkington Report. Some companies, historian Simon Cherry notes, were scrambling "very readily for the lowest common denominator ... Tyne Tees was notorious for avoiding minority programmes and putting out cop shows or westerns instead."
- 1963
  - Production of The Viewer is taken over by Dickens Press.
- 1964
  - March – The final edition of Tyne Tees' lunchtime variety programme The One O'Clock Show is broadcast. Consequently, Tyne Tees no longer transmits at lunchtime, and does not do so again until 1972.
  - 30 March – Tyne Tees introduces a nightly regional news programme called North East Newsview. Previously, regional news had consisted of short bulletins and a weekly Friday night programme called North East Roundabout.
  - Tyne Tees is given a three-year extension to its licence. This is later extended by a further year.
- 1965
  - No events.
- 1966
  - No events.
- 1967
  - The Independent Television Authority renews Tyne Tees' licence for a further seven years.
- 1968
  - August – A technicians strike forces ITV off the air for several weeks although management manage to launch a temporary ITV Emergency National Service with no regional variations.
  - September – The final issue of Tyne Tees’ listings magazine The Viewer is published. From the following week, listings are carried in the magazine TV Times after the ITA had stipulated that all ITV companies publish their listings in the TV Times.
- 1969
  - Tyne Tees’ regional news programme is renamed Today at Six.
  - Tyne Tees begins broadcasting in UHF and does so from the Pontop Pike transmitting station. It continues to radiate 405-lines transmissions to the northern part of its region from the Burnhope transmitting station until the 405-line system is switched off at the start of 1985.

== 1970s ==
- 1970
  - 13 July — Tyne Tees Television scraps its plans to build a studio in Middlesbrough.
  - 17 July — Tyne Tees Television starts broadcasting in colour.
  - 21 August – Yorkshire Television and Tyne Tees Television announce plans to merge when the two are brought under the control of a new holding company, Trident Television Limited, to deal with the problem of fairly allocating commercial airtime from a television transmitter at Bilsdale in North Yorkshire which straddled the catchment areas of two Independent Television (ITV) companies. the new holding company would sell airtime in both television regions with each company retaining its own separate identity and management control.
- 1971
  - 15 March – The Bilsdale transmitting station, which had originally been intended for Yorkshire Television, begins transmitting Tyne Tees in colour to County Durham and the northernmost parts of Yorkshire.
- 1972
  - 16 October – Following a law change which removed all restrictions on broadcasting hours, ITV is able to launch an afternoon service.
- 1973
  - No events.
- 1974
  - A reverse takeover of both Tyne Tees and Yorkshire is performed by Trident but plans to rename the stations 'Trident Yorkshire' and 'Trident Tyne-Tees' were vetoed by the Independent Broadcasting Authority.
- 1975
  - No events.
- 1976
  - 6 September – Northern Life replaces Today at Six as Tyne Tees’ regional news programme.
- 1977
  - 28 March – Tyne Tees Television begins a nine-week trial of breakfast television. The experiment ends on 27 May.
- 1978
  - No events.
- 1979
  - 10 August – The ten week ITV strike forces Tyne Tees Television off the air.
  - 24 October – Tyne Tees marks the end of the ITV strike by launching its most famous logo.

== 1980s ==
- 1980
  - 28 December – The Independent Broadcasting Authority announces the new contractors to commence on 1 January 1982 and Tyne Tees Television is reawarded its licence on the condition that it demerges with Yorkshire Television.
- 1981
  - Tyne Tees opens a fifth studio at its Newcastle studios so it can provide programming for the soon to launch Channel 4
- 1982
  - January – Trident Television's stake in Tyne Tees Television is now down to 25%.
  - 5 November – Tyne Tees' first programme for Channel 4, music show The Tube, airs for the first time. Broadcast live from studio 5 at the City Road studios, the programme's debut comes on the channel's fourth day of broadcasting.
- 1983
  - 1 February – ITV’s breakfast television service TV-am launches. Consequently, Tyne Tees Television’s broadcast day now begins at 9:25 am and the channel no longer starts its day with a religious programme, apart from on Sundays.
  - 24 June – A Midsummer Night's Tube, a special five-hour edition of The Tube, airs live from 8pm to 1am on Channel 4. A second edition is broadcast a year later.
  - Tyne Tees launches two sub-regional news programmes as part a commitment in the 1980 contract round. An opt-out is used from the main bulletin that would feature news from each area. The company also introduces localised non-news programming for the two sub-regions, including the nightly Epilogues.
- 1984
  - No events.
- 1985
  - 3 January – Tyne Tees stops using the Burnhope transmitting station as Tyne Tees had only used Burnhope for 405-lines transmission and this day marks the switching off of 405-lines.
  - 16 August – The station is off the air all day (from 9:25am) due to industrial action. “The Big Tube”, a live peak-time Tyne Tees production due to be screened on Channel 4, is postponed and subsequently cancelled, and no commercials are shown on Channel 4 in the Tyne Tees region.
- 1986
  - No events.
- 1987
  - 24 April - The final edition of The Tube airs on Channel 4.
  - 9 June - The first edition of The Roxy, Tyne Tees' new weekly music show, airs across the ITV network.
  - 7 September – Following the transfer of ITV Schools to Channel 4, ITV provides a full morning programme schedule, with advertising, for the first time. The new service includes regular five-minute national and regional news bulletins. Tyne Tees has the honour of producing the very first programme broadcast on the new service - a quiz show called Chain Letters.
  - 7 December – Tyne Tees begins 24-hour broadcasting. It does so by launching a Jobfinder service which broadcasts each night from after closedown until the start of TV-am at 6am.
- 1988
  - 5 April - The final edition of The Roxy airs in various timeslots across several ITV regions, marking the end of Tyne Tees' production of music programming for both ITV and Channel 4.
  - 1 September – Tyne Tees broadcasts an end of day Epilogue for the final time, having done so since the station went on air 29 years earlier.
  - 2 September – Tyne Tees begins broadcasting a full 24-hour service by relaying Granada Television's Night Time service.
  - 5 September – Tyne Tees introduces its ‘’flowing rivers’’ logo.
- 1989
  - 1 September – ITV introduces its first official logo as part of an attempt to unify the network under one image whilst retaining regional identity. Tyne Tees adopts the look.

== 1990s ==
- 1990
  - Yorkshire Television buys Vaux Breweries' 19 percent stake in Tyne Tees.
  - Autumn – Tyne Tees starts broadcasting in NICAM digital stereo.
- 1991
  - 25 February – Tyne Tees reintroduces its own logo.
  - 16 October – The Independent Television Commission announces the results of the franchise round. Tyne Tees Television is reawarded its licence, having bid £15.1 million to see off a rival bid from North East Television.
- 1992
  - June – Yorkshire Television and Tyne Tees Television merge and create a new company Yorkshire-Tyne Tees Television. This is the beginning a process that would see the consolidation of ITV over the next decade.
  - 5 October –
    - Following the merger, Yorkshire simulcasts its overnight service on Tyne Tees and relaunches it as Nightshift.
    - A new logo is introduced.
    - Tyne Tees' regional news programme Northern Life is replaced by Tyne Tees Today.
- 1993
  - 1 January – Following their merger, Yorkshire and Tyne Tees start to broadcast all regional programmes simultaneously, affecting programming that had been shown at different paces in different regions. Most of the regional programming was produced by Yorkshire and broadcast across the two stations, an area that the ITC considered too broad to be of local interest.
  - 31 March – Network North launches, providing the south of the region with its own regional news magazine. It is available to viewers served by the Bilsdale transmitter. Tyne Tees Today therefore becomes the name of the north of the region programme for those served by the Pontop Pike and Chatton transmitters.
  - September - Yorkshire Television's transmission control centre in Leeds takes over Tyne Tees' playout operations. Local continuity from Newcastle is maintained during most of the channel's broadcast hours.
- 1994
  - No events.
- 1995
  - November – Tyne Tees Today and Network North are renamed Tyne Tees News although the separate news services for the North and South of the region continue as before.
- 1996
  - 16 March – Tyne Tees' presentation department is closed, with continuity transferred to Leeds.
  - 2 September –
    - Tyne Tees is renamed Channel 3 North East. although 'Tyne Tees Television' is retained as the company name.
    - The two separate regional news magazines are replaced by a single news programme called North East Tonight. However a live 15-minute broadcast from Billingham for the south of the region is inserted into the merged programme.
    - Mike Neville, long-serving anchorman of the BBC's regional news programme Look North rejoins Tyne Tees as the new anchor of North East Tonight. Neville previously worked at Tyne Tees as an announcer, newsreader and presenter from 1962 to 1964.
- 1997
  - 26 June – Yorkshire-Tyne Tees Television is acquired by Granada Media Group.
- 1998
  - 9 March – The unpopular Channel 3 North East branding is scrapped and the Tyne Tees name returns to the airwaves.
  - 15 November – The public launch of digital terrestrial TV in the UK takes place.
- 1999
  - January – A new ten-year contract for Tyne Tees begins two years earlier than scheduled following a decision that allows companies, including Tyne Tees, which had bid high in 1991, to apply early to try to win financial relief and from this year, the cost of the tender fee that Tyne Tees paid fell to £46 million, from the £70.5 million that it paid in 1998.
  - 8 November – A new, hearts-based on-air look is introduced.

== 2000s ==
- 2000
  - No events.
- 2001
  - No events.
- 2002
  - 28 October – On-air regional identities are dropped apart from when introducing regional programmes and Tyne Tees is renamed ITV1 Tyne Tees.
- 2003
  - No events.
- 2004
  - January – The final two remaining English ITV companies, Carlton and Granada, merge to create a single England and Wales ITV company called ITV plc.
  - 31 October – The Tyne Tees logo is seen at the end of its own programmes for the final time.
- 2005
  - 1 July – After more than 45 years the final broadcasts from Tyne Tees’ City Road studios in central Newcastle take place. From the following day, Tyne Tees is based at smaller studios in Gateshead.
  - July – Mike Neville presents what would become his final edition of North East Tonight due to health problems.
  - August – North East Tonight becomes two separate programmes for the north and the south of the region. However all other regions news bulletins remain as a single pan-regional bulletin.
- 2006
  - 5 June – Nearly a year after presenting his last programme, Mike Neville confirms his departure from Tyne Tees and retires from regional television after over 40 years.
  - 13 November – The Tyne Tees branding, still seen before some regional programming, is discontinued.
  - 13 December – The Berwick-upon-Tweed transmitter transfers from Border to Tyne Tees as part of the preparations for the digital switchover of the Border region in 2008.
- 2007
  - No events.
- 2008
  - December – All non-news local programming ends after Ofcom gives ITV permission to drastically cut back its regional programming. From 2009 the only regional programme is the monthly political discussion show.
- 2009
  - 13 February – The final North and South sub-regional editions of North East Tonight are broadcast as part of a series of major cutbacks to ITV's regional broadcasts in England.
  - 25 February – The Tyne Tees and Border regions are merged to form ITV Tyne Tees & Border with Border's regional news magazine Lookaround transferred to the studios of Tyne Tees in Gateshead. The North East Tonight and Lookaround titles are retained for the weekday 6pm programme and late bulletin, whilst shorter bulletins are known simply as Tyne Tees & Border News.

== 2010s ==
- 2010
  - No events.
- 2011
  - No events.
- 2012
  - 26 September – The Tyne Tees region completes digital switchover.
- 2013
  - 4 January – The Tyne-Tees news service is rebranded as ITV News Tyne Tees. and pan-regional bulletins are branded as ITV News Tyne Tees & Border.
  - 23 July – Proposals to reintroduce full regional services for the Tyne Tees and Border regions were approved by OFCOM, effectively leading to a demerger of the Tyne Tees and Border services.
  - 16 September – Lookaround and ITV News Tyne Tees are restored as fully separate regional programmes on weekdays with shorter daytime and weekend bulletins reintroduced. Consequently, the weekday daytime, late evening and weekend bulletins as well as 20 minutes of the 6pm programme are once again more localised. Both programmes continue to be broadcast from Tyne Tees' Gateshead studios with extra journalists recruited for newsgathering in the Border region.

== See also ==
- History of ITV
- History of ITV television idents
- Timeline of ITV
