= Jonathan Morrell =

British journalist and presenter

- Born: Sheffield
- Known for: Presenter; journalist
- Website: Jonathan Morrell on Twitter https://web.archive.org/web/20140427122645 UkWa Radio (dead link)

Jonathan Morrell is an English presenter and journalist who is an executive producer with BBC Radio Cumbria.

== Personal life ==
Morrell is a graduate of the media department at the University of Sunderland in Sunderland, England and lives in the North East of England. He struggled with depression for many years and was diagnosed with cyclothymia after moving to Perth, Western Australia in 2012. In 2015 he revealed that coming out as gay has cost him ‘employment opportunities’.

== Career ==
Morrell worked for radio and television stations including BBC Radio Newcastle (1990–1994, 2018), BBC Radio Cleveland (1994–1996), Sky News (1997, 2002–2004), ITV Yorkshire's Calendar (2001), ITV News Channel (2002–2004), and Wellbeing Channel (2001).

He has worked for ITV Tyne Tees on and off as a continuity announcer and then a newsreader, since 1990. In 1996, he joined the newsroom as a bulletin editor and then a reporter/presenter. In 2004, however, he joined full-time, mainly covering for Mike Neville, who was ill in 2005, as one of many presenters at the station. His role as a presenter became more permanent when he became a co-presenter of the new North edition of ITV News Tyne Tees in January 2006, after the departure of Neville, initially alongside Pam Royle and from September 2006 with Pip Tomson. In 2007, Morrell joined Real Radio (formerly Century FM) as a presenter of the mid-morning show on the North East radio service. He was heard on it from 10:00–14:00 from Monday to Friday and 10:00–13:00 each Sunday.

In December 2008, it was announced that Morrell would leave as part of a round of job cuts at ITV Tyne Tees. He presented his final programme for the station on Thursday 17 December 2008. On 2 September 2011 after five years at Real Radio, Morrell presented his final show, quitting radio and TV presenting in the UK. Morrell emigrated to Perth where he presented the early breakfast show on 720 ABC Perth, which is one of the stations in the ABC Local Radio network. He occasionally produces and presents an 80s Rewind Music Show for a number of stations around the UK and in Europe.

Morrell was a producer on Perth's Channel 7 for the evening news show. In September 2014 he launched UKWA Perth's British radio station, an online and FM station, for expats in Perth and Western Australia. He returned to the UK in November 2015 and joined BBC Wiltshire to present its daily mid-morning show. In 2018 he was appointed chairman of Pride Community Network and opened the Pride Media Centre, including Pride Radio (North East), at a former BBC television studio in Gateshead. Morrell is the executive producer at BBC Radio Cumbria.
