= Darlington College =

Coordinates: 54.5299°N 1.5408°W

Location
- Central Park; Haughton Road; Darlington, County Durham, DL1 1DR; England

Information
- Type: Further education college
- Department for Education URN: 130656 Tables
- Ofsted: Reports
- Principal: David Gartland
- Age: 14+
- Telephone: 01325 503050
- Fax: 01325 503000
- Website: http://www.darlington.ac.uk

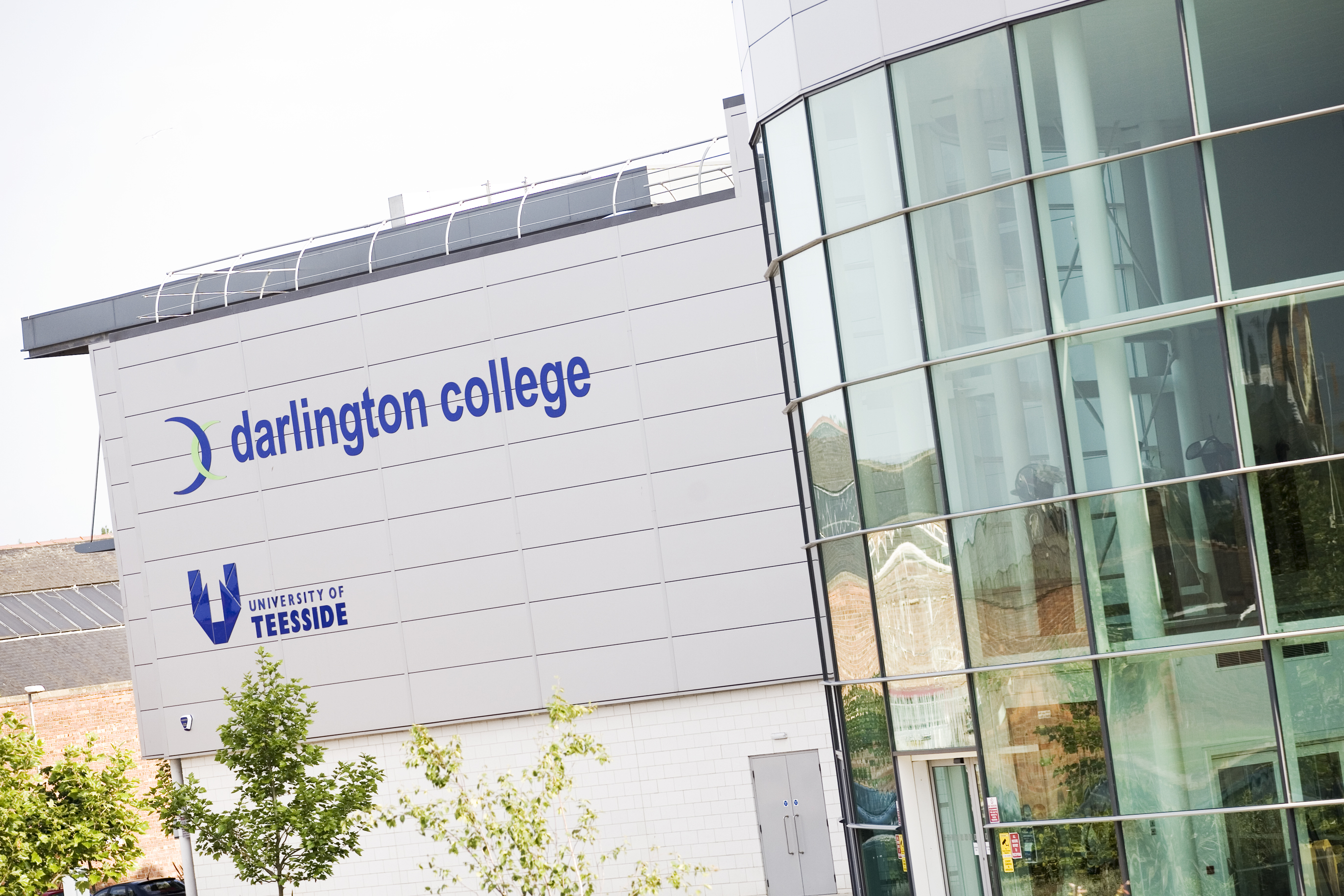
Darlington College Exterior

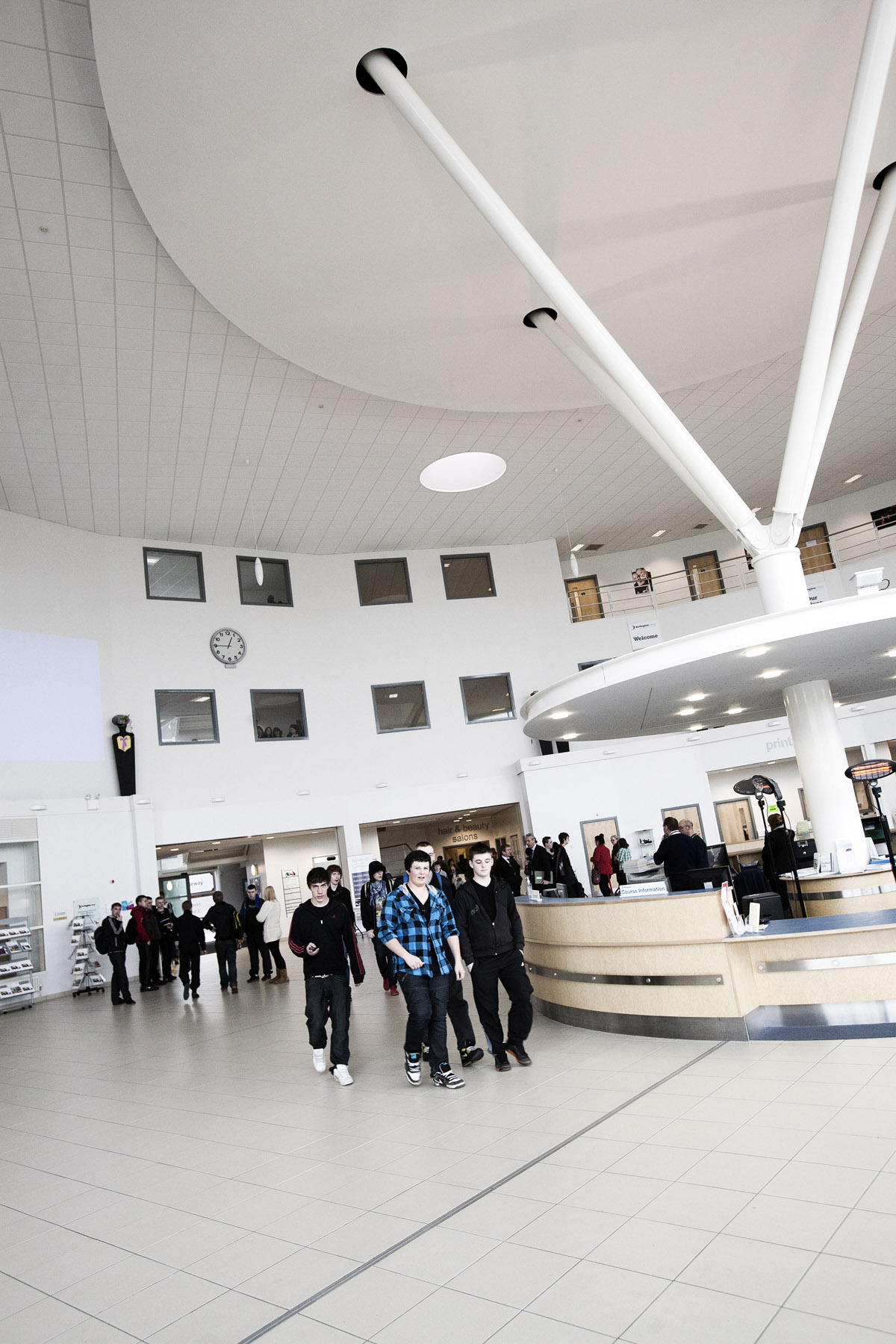
Darlington College Central Point

Darlington College is a further education college in Darlington, County Durham, England. The college campus is located at Central Park, Haughton Road. With support from Darlington Borough Council and Tees Valley Regeneration the college building was constructed by Shepherd Construction, starting in 2004. Founded in 1897, it assumed its present form in September 2006 and was officially opened by the then-Prime Minister, Tony Blair, on 22 December 2006.

== Teaching ==
The college offers a wide range of vocational courses from Hair and Beauty to Construction Services. The University Centre unites the further and higher education of Darlington College with that of Queen Elizabeth Sixth Form College and the University of Teesside.

== College facilities ==
Darlington College offers a learning and training environment which includes: a university centre; 'business first' - bespoke training for employers; a well equipped computing and networking suite; sports facilities; media design centre; restaurant and food court; hair and Beauty salons. The restaurant and hair and beauty salons are open to the public.

== History as Technical College ==
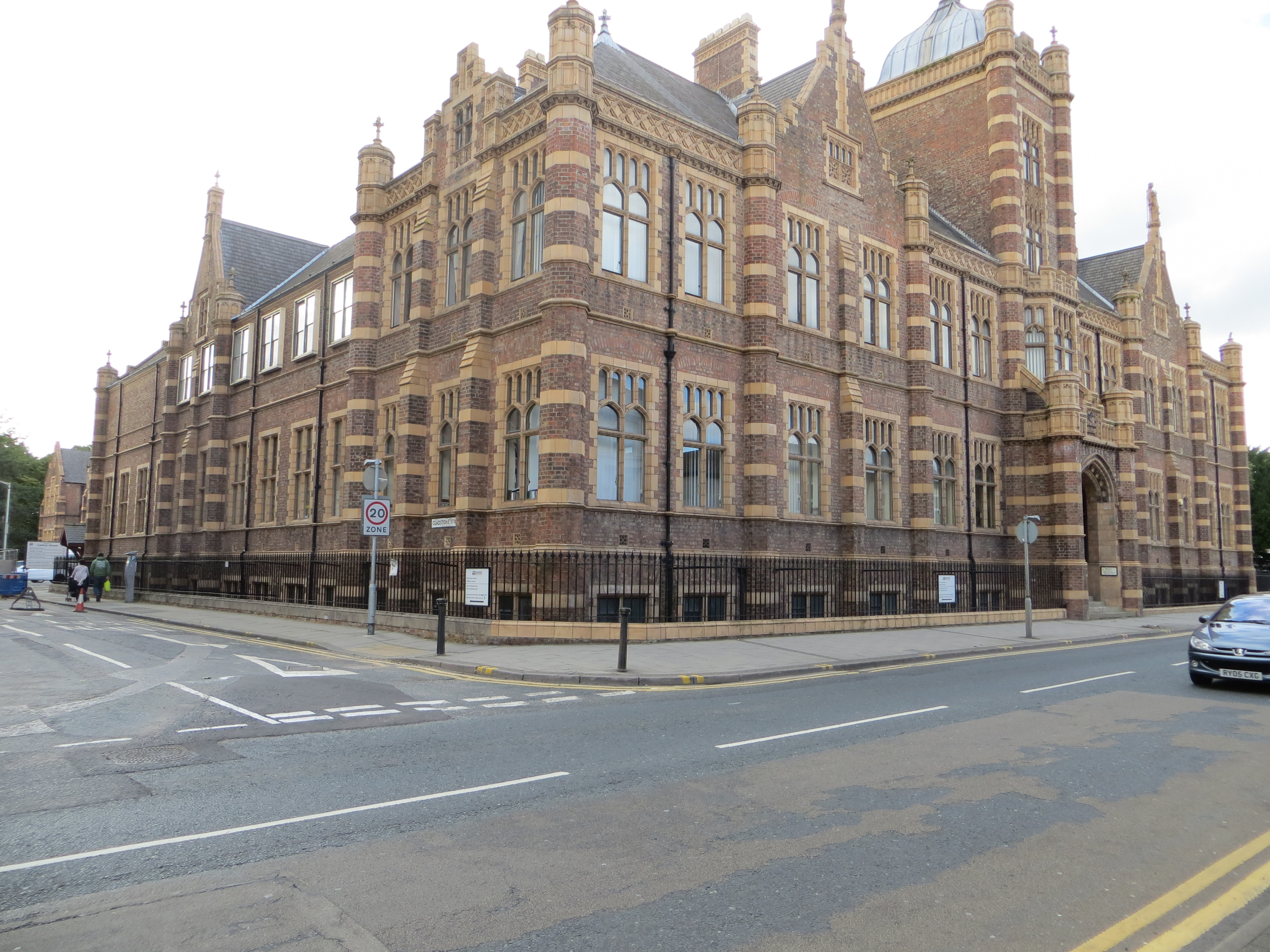
Former premises

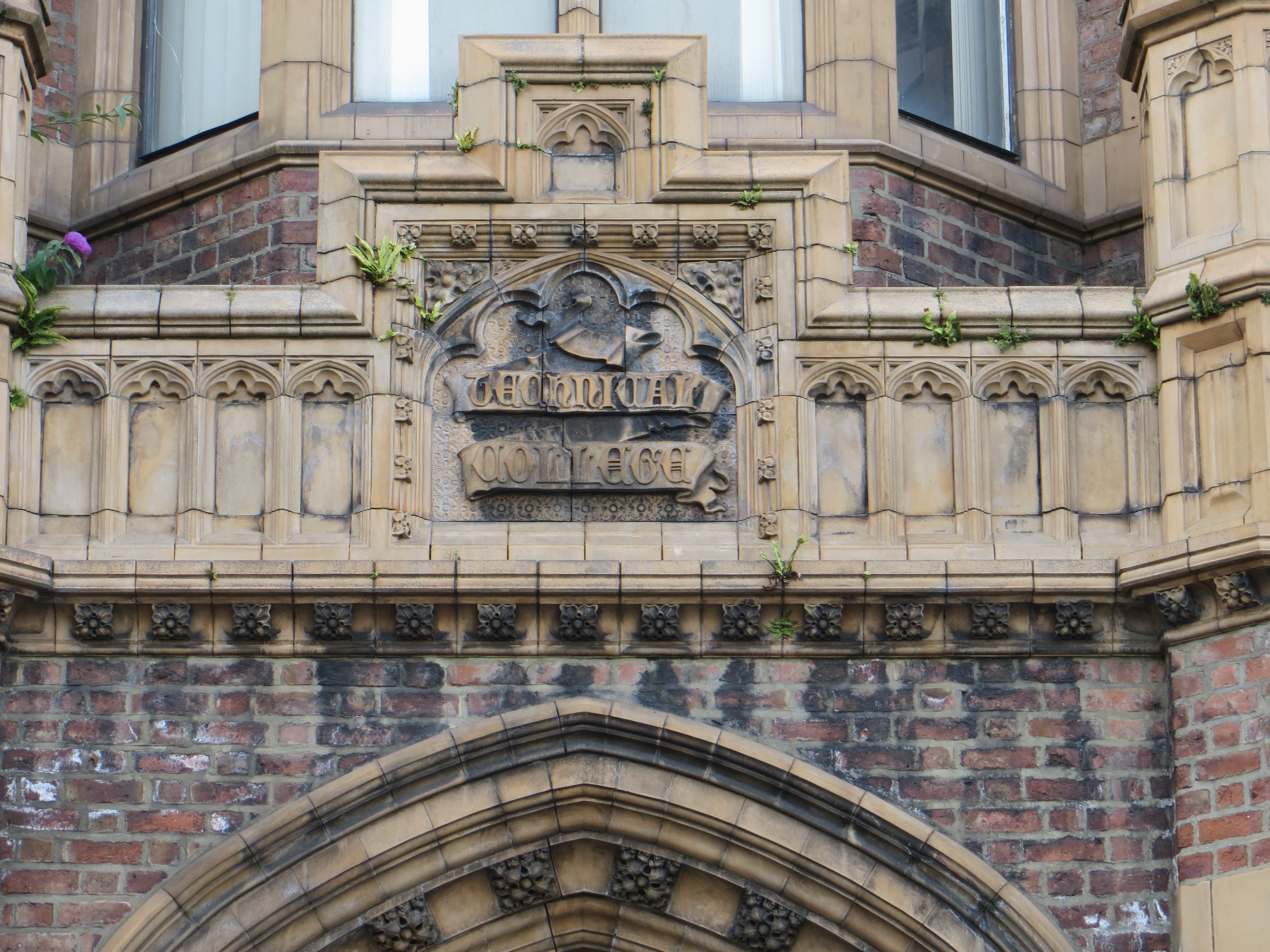
Former premises doorsign

The college was originally named "Darlington Technical College", which was constructed in 1897 designed by George Gordon Hoskins. It opened in October 1897. It was built by the Borough of Darlington next to North Lodge Park "to help continue the efficiency of manufacturing and commerce".

By the 1950s the college used 28 buildings around Darlington and in 1955 took over the Girls High School building in Cleveland Avenue. New blocks were opened in 1957, and between 1963 and 1972 further development concentrated education on a single site. Darlington College of Education was also part of the institution's offerings, but closed in 1978. However, later associations with institutions of higher learning now provide for teacher training.

Darlington College of Technology re-branded in 2006 when it moved to its new site situated on Haughton Road. It became known as Darlington College, the name it still uses today.

== Notable alumni ==
- Luke Armstrong, professional footballer who qualified as a personal trainer at the college
- Alex Cunningham, Member of Parliament for Stockton North (2010 -)
- Carol Malia, BBC Look North presenter
- Pauline Murray, lead singer of the band Penetration
- John Sergeant, journalist and former Chief Political Correspondent for the BBC
