= Northern Life =

Northern Life may refer to:

- Northern Life (newspaper), a community newspaper in Sudbury, Canada
- Northern Life (TV programme), a regional news programme on Tyne Tees Television in Newcastle upon Tyne, England
