= Jeremy Nicholas =

Jeremy Nicholas may refer to:

- Jeremy Nicholas (writer) (born 1947), writer, journalist, actor and composer
- Jeremy Nicholas (broadcaster), broadcaster, writer, speaker and journalist
