= Paul Mooney (broadcaster) =

British weather presenter

- Born: Clydebank, Scotland
- Occupation(s): Weather presenter, meteorologist

Paul Mooney is a weather presenter and journalist, best known for his work on the television news programme BBC Look North in the North East of England.

== Biography ==
Mooney was born and raised in Clydebank, Scotland, before moving to Newcastle Upon Tyne in the North East of England.

Mooney spent 17 years at the Met Office before becoming the Weather Team Leader for the BBC in Newcastle Upon Tyne in 2002. Paul is a regular weather presenter on BBC Look North main evening and late programmes.

In 2021, Mooney opened Prudhoe Pocket Park, a former car park which was turned into a green space for the local community in that area.

Mooney swapped his role as a broadcaster to work on Tyne and Wear Metro for the day, as part of a report in February 2023.

Mooney often gives talks at science and weather events across the North East. He is the longest serving weather presenter for the BBC Look North North East and Cumbria area.

In 2023, Mooney took part in a national journalists strike outside BBC Newcastle as cuts were set to take place across local services. Mooney alongside Carol Malia and Dawn Thewlis were off air. In addition to his television work, Mooney regularly appears on BBC Radio Newcastle and BBC Radio Tees on The Afternoon Show playing an on air quiz with the presenter Scott Makin and gives hourly weather updates.

== Personal life ==
Mooney is married to Margo and the couple have three children. He lives in Prudhoe, Northumberland.
