= Keith Wilkinson =

Keith Wilkinson may refer to:

- Keith Wilkinson (musician), British musician who was the bassist for Squeeze
- Keith Wilkinson (reporter), British television reporter
- Keith Wilkinson (cricketer) (born 1950), former English cricketer
