= Television Centre =

Television Centre or TV Centre may refer to:

- Television Centre, London, former headquarters of BBC, England
- Television Centre, Newcastle upon Tyne, former headquarters of Tyne Tees Television, England
- Television Centre, Southampton, former home of three ITV contractors in England
- TV Centre (Russia), a state-run Russia TV station

== See also ==
- Beijing TV Centre, home to Beijing Television, China
- Breakfast Television Centre, the headquarters of MTV Europe, in Camden Town, London, England
- RTÉ Television Centre, home to Ireland's national public service broadcaster
- Osterley Television Centre (or Sky Studios), Isleworth, London, England
- Television Centre Birmingham (or BBC Birmingham), England
- Vatican Television Centre, part of Vatican Media, Vatican City
