= Paul Mooney =

Paul Mooney may refer to:

== Sports ==
- Paul Mooney (basketball) (1897–1977), American basketball player and coach
- Paul Mooney (cricketer) (born 1976), Irish cricketer
- Paul Mooney (footballer) (1901–1980), Scottish footballer
- Paul Mooney (rugby union) (1930–2006), Australian rugby union player
- Paul A. Mooney (died 2000), American sports executive

== Others ==
- Paul Mooney (comedian) (1941–2021), American comedian, writer, television and film actor
- Paul Mooney (broadcaster), British weather presenter
- Paul Mooney (writer) (1904–1939), American writer
- Paul Mooney (college president), president, National College of Ireland
- Paul Mooney (priest) (born 1958), Dean of Ferns

== See also ==
- Paul Muni (1895–1967), American actor
