= Catherine Jacob =

Catherine Jacob may refer to:

- Catherine Jacob (journalist) (born 1976), news correspondent for the British television network Sky News
- Catherine Jacob (actress) (born 1956), French actress
