= Oglaza =

Oglaza or Ogłaza is a surname. Notable people with this surname include:

- Aleksandra Ogłaza, Polish beauty pageant contestant
- Glen Oglaza, British journalist
- Szymon Ogłaza (born 1979), Polish politician
