= Patrick Hart =

British-Kuwaiti radio and TV personality

Patrick G. Hart
- Born: 5 August 1965 (age 60); Kuwait City
- Citizenship: British
- Occupations: TV Host, broadcaster, recording artist
- Years active: 1993-present
- Spouse: Sherrie Eugene

Patrick G. Hart (born 5 August 1965) is a TV host, radio broadcaster and recording artist based in Bristol, England. He is the director and station manager of Bristol-based BCFM radio and a broadcaster on BBC Radio, BCFM and Made Television. Hart currently hosts The One Love Breakfast show on BCFM and co-hosts The Carib-Asian Cookery Show with wife Sherrie Eugene, on Made in Bristol. He is also a recording artist with the band Freshblood Crew and the founder of Bristol Athletic Football Club.

== Early life and career ==
Hart was born in Kuwait City in 1965. He lived in Chilwell, Nottingham until the age of 13 when his family moved to Bristol, England. He began his professional career in 1993 as the managing director at Freshblood Records. Hart joined BCFM in 2009 as station manager and became chief executive officer in 2010.

He is the co author of The Carib-Asian Cookery Book Recipes and Rhymes published by SilverWood Books. Currently he is the host at The One Love Breakfast show on BCFM and The Carib-Asian Cookery Show on Made in Bristol.
