= Jo Andrews =

British television journalist

- Occupations: Journalist, presenter, director
- Notable credit: ITN News (1985-1993, 1997-2002)

Jo Andrews is a former British television journalist who worked as a senior political correspondent for ITN during the 1990s and 2000s. She subsequently gained extensive experience in the charity world, as a director of the Ruben and Elisabeth Rausing Trust. She is currently the co-founder of Equileap, an Organization promoting gender equality in the workplace.

== Career ==
Her career in journalism began at the Esher News and Mail in Surrey where she worked as a general reporter. After joining the BBC as a trainee journalist, she worked for BBC radio, before later moving to Independent Radio News. She joined ITN in 1985, where she initially worked as a general reporter before becoming a political correspondent for the network in 1990. She left ITN in 1993, moving to New Zealand where she established a news agency, but returned to ITN again in 1997. She was appointed as senior political correspondent in 1999, and was the first woman to join press conferences held by the Labour Party during the run-up to the 2001 general election. Later in 2001 she also interviewed then British Prime Minister Tony Blair in Brussels in the wake of the September 11 terrorist attacks.

In September 2002 Andrews announced that she would be leaving ITN to become a director of the Rausing Trust, a charitable trust that donates money to groups including human rights organisations and women's groups. Her decision to leave the broadcaster came shortly after that of its Political Editor, John Sergeant. Andrews did not comment on her departure, but The Independent on Sunday reported at the time that she was believed to be unhappy that she had been overlooked for Sergeant's job in favour of the then Washington correspondent, James Mates. Andrews left ITN in December 2002.

In 2008, Andrews founded Ariadne Trust, which was set up to enable European human rights and social change donors to collaborate, to share knowledge and to think through the difficult problems that face them collectively. It currently has more than 600 members. She later became a board member of Mama Cash, as well as Fund for Global Human Rights, two leading charity organizations. She has also co-founded Equileap together with Diana van Maasdijk, an organisation aiming at speeding up progress towards gender equality in the workplace.
