= Michael Thewlis =

English cricketer

Michael James Thewlis (born 19 January 1970) was an English cricketer. He was a right-handed batsman and a right-arm medium-pace bowler who played for Northumberland. He was born in Ashington.

Thewlis made a single List A appearance for the team, in the 1994 NatWest Trophy, against Nottinghamshire. He scored a duck in the match, and took just one wicket, that of former England Test cricketer Tim Robinson.

Thewlis continued to play for Northumberland in the Minor Counties Championship until 1998. He joined West Hertfordshire between 2002 and 2004, and played for Winchmore Hill between 2005 and 2006.

Thewlis' father Jim and uncle Joe both played cricket for Northumberland during the 1970s.
