= Tori Lacey =

British weather forecaster (born 1973)

Victoria “Tori” Lacey (née Good, born May 1973) is a meteorologist and weather presenter working with ITV Weather.

== Career ==
Lacey joined the Met Office in 2000, when she was trained as a forecaster and subsequently posted to the BBC Weather Centre in April 2001. Her first broadcasts went to air in June 2001 on BBC World. She appeared regularly on this channel, and then later on the BBC News channel, as well as the range of national BBC radio stations, including a lengthy stint exclusively for BBC Radio 5 Live.

In early broadcasts, she was known on screen as Tori Good. After marrying, she changed her name to Tori Lacey.

Lacey broadcast her last weather forecast on Friday, 12 June 2009 (12.30 on the Victoria Derbyshire show) prior to going on maternity leave. She returned in mid-2010. She later left the BBC in 2011, although she continued to broadcast for BBC London after she left the BBC Weather Centre.

Lacey joined ITV Weather based at MediaCity UK, Salford Quays in February 2023. She is one of the Hub weekend weather presenters for Calendar, Granada Reports, UTV Live, ITV News Tyne Tees & Lookaround.

== Personal life ==
She is married to Chris Lacey.
