= Keith Wilkinson (reporter) =

- Born: Keith Wilkinson; Lancaster, Lancashire, England
- Occupation: News Correspondent
- Notable credit(s): ITV News, Central Tonight, Carlton TV, Central Television

Keith Wilkinson is a former British television reporter and news correspondent for 35 years. In September 2019 ITV News announced he was leaving them to become a freelance writer and author.

Born in Lancashire, England, he began his career in newspaper journalism as a trainee reporter at The Westmorland Gazette in Kendal, Cumbria, in 1974. He joined Central Television in the former Associated TeleVision Broad Street studios in Birmingham in 1984 as a production journalist, sub-editor, programme producer and bulletin newsreader. Keith Wilkinson became a senior correspondent, appearing on ITV News Central, formerly Central News and Central Tonight.

== Broadcasting awards ==
Keith Wilkinson won numerous awards for broadcasting, including the national BT Television News Broadcaster of the Year, the ITV Piece to Camera Gold Award 2004, the Birmingham Press Club's Scoop of the Year, and Television Journalist of the Year 2008 in the Midlands Media Awards. He received the ITV Judges' Award in 2008 for what was described as an outstanding contribution to ITV for his role as a mentor in the training of regional journalists. He was nominated for a Royal Television Society (Midlands) award in 2010 for a series about the Battle of Arnhem. In May 2014 at the British Film Institute, Wilkinson received the ITV News Gold Award for the best news feature of 2013 – for his reporting of the Stafford Hospital scandal. In recognition of his contribution to journalism, he was made an Honorary Life Member of Birmingham Press Club and was presented with the club's Bugle Award in 2019.

== Career at ITV ==
In 1993 when he was Central's investigative Crime Reporter, he produced an ITV documentary called Stephanie's Story about the kidnapping of estate agent Stephanie Slater by the murderer Michael Sams. Wilkinson was featured in the book, Beyond Fear, My Will To Survive, in which Stephanie describes being taken back to the workshop in Nottinghamshire where she was held hostage.

Wilkinson was the first television reporter to interview members of the Bridgewater Four on camera whilst they were still serving life sentences in prison. The campaigning Daily Mirror and Private Eye journalist Paul Foot wrote in the book Murder at the Farm that Wilkinson's "persistence in this case contrasted sharply with the abject acceptance of the authorised view by almost all his journalist colleagues in the Midlands".

In 2003 Wilkinson was calling for greater media access to the British judicial system. In an article in The Guardian he described the principle of open justice as a joke.

Wilkinson also became known for more light-hearted items. In 2006 he was photographed in the Daily Star having a bucket of water poured over his head by Chris Tarrant, star of ITV's Who Wants to Be a Millionaire? This was a tribute to Tarrant's days on the Tiswas programme when he frequently covered people in water.

Keith Wilkinson was featured as The Human Guinea Pig in a six-month experiment starting in March 2008 on Central Tonight and itvlocal.com. It was launched in conjunction with researchers at the University of Birmingham in England as part of a project about physical fitness in the over-50s. By July, Ironman triathlete Asker Jeukendrup, Professor of Exercise Metabolism and head of the university's Human Performance Laboratory, told ITV that Wilkinson's rate of progress had been "unusual and spectacular". At the end of the project in September, Jeukendrup gave Wilkinson a VO_{2} max fitness assessment as a high 52.3.

As part of an ITV News Central special programme in April 2014, Wilkinson filmed Paddy Hill of the Birmingham Six inside the former prison wing at Lancaster Castle where Hill had been held during his trial for the Birmingham pub bombings almost 40 years earlier. It was the first time Hill had returned to the prison and his old cell since his conviction for 21 murders was quashed at the Court of Appeal of England and Wales in 1991, and in an exclusive interview Hill said his time at HMP Lancaster had been the start of a 16-year nightmare to clear his name. Wilkinson had first interviewed Paddy Hill for Central News inside Gartree Prison in Leicestershire in the 1980s before his appeal hearing at the Old Bailey.

== External links and sources ==
- TV Newsroom video of Keith Wilkinson final studio interview
- ITV.com/Central
- TV Newsroom
- Keith Wilkinson on Twitter
- twitpic photos of Wilkinson at ITV and as Human Guinea Pig
- Keith Wilkinson filming at ITV Royal Wedding studios
- List and photos of ITV regional news reporters and correspondents
