= Joe Thewlis =

English cricketer and footballer (1939–2010)

Personal information
- Full name: Joseph Thewlis
- Born: 14 April 1939; Percy Main, Northumberland, England
- Died: 24 November 2010 (aged 71); Newcastle upon Tyne, Northumberland, England
- Batting: Right-handed
- Bowling: Right-arm medium

Domestic team information
- Years: Team
- 1963–1981: Northumberland
- 1962: Combined Services

Career statistics
Competition	First-class	List A
Matches	1	2
Runs scored	18	26
Batting average	9.00	13.00
100s/50s	–/–	–/–
Top score	17	19
Balls bowled	–	–
Wickets	–	–
Bowling average	–	–
5 wickets in innings	–	–
10 wickets in match	–	–
Best bowling	–	–
Catches/stumpings	2/–	–/–
- Source: Cricinfo, 2 July 2011

Joseph Thewlis (14 April 1939 – 24 November 2010) was an English cricketer and footballer. In cricket, Thewlis was a right-handed batsman who bowled right-arm medium pace. He was born in Percy Main, Northumberland.

== Cricket career ==
Serving in the Royal Air Force allowed Thewlis to make his only first-class appearance for the Combined Services against Cambridge University in 1962. He scored a single run in the Combined Services first-innings, before being dismissed by Paul Ramage. In their second-innings, he scored 17 runs before being dismissed by the same bowler.

He made his debut for Northumberland in the 1963 Minor Counties Championship against Durham. Thewlis played Minor counties cricket for Northumberland from 1963 to 1981, which included 152 Minor Counties Championship appearances. He scored 2,225 runs in total, taking 100 catches as well. He made his List A debut against Lincolnshire in the 1971 Gillette Cup. In this match, he was dismissed for 7 runs by Sonny Ramadhin. He made a further List A appearance against Somerset in the 1977 Gillette Cup. In this match, he dismissed for 19 runs by Ian Botham. He also captained Northumberland on a number of occasions.

== Football career ==
Thewlis played mostly for the reserves of Everton and Newcastle United, as well as for North Shields and Spennymoor United.

== Personal life ==
Thewlis was married for 34 years before separating from his wife. They had two children, including broadcaster Dawn Thewlis. His nephew, Michael Thewlis, also played Minor counties and List A cricket for Northumberland. Thewlis died in Newcastle upon Tyne on 24 November 2010, following a battle with cancer.
