= Carol Malia =

British broadcaster and journalist (born 1968)

Deputy Lord Lieutenant of Northumberland
- Incumbent
- Assumed office 2012

Personal details
- Born: 28 November 1968 (age 57) Tynemouth, England, UK
- Occupation: BBC Look North presenter

Carol Malia (born 28 November 1968) is a broadcaster and journalist who has presented the north eastern version of the BBC regional news programme Look North since 1997.

== Early life ==
Malia was born in 1968 in Tynemouth and raised in Cullercoats. She attended Monkhouse Primary School in North Shields, then Marden High School, and after her A-Levels, she studied journalism at Darlington College, before becoming a junior reporter on the Hartlepool Mail newspaper.

== Broadcasting ==
After a period as chief reporter on the Hartlepool Mail, Malia moved into broadcasting, first at Radio Cumbria, then Border Television in Carlisle. After that, she moved to Tyne Tees Television and landed the presenting job on Look North in 1997. She took over presenting when Mike Neville moved to Tyne Tees Television. Fellow presenter Jeff Brown, who broadcasts the sports element and stands in for Malia when she is absent, describes her as "unflappable". In 2003, Malia revealed that she was the victim of two stalkers who had sent poison-pen and threatening letters to her.

== Affiliations ==
Malia is a Deputy Lord Lieutenant of Northumberland and patron of the charity Northumbrian Blood Bikes. She is also a trustee of Bravehearts North East and a Vice President of the Gosforth-based Community Foundation.

== Personal life ==
Malia married Gary Hudson, a company manager, in February 2005, and they have a daughter (born July 2009) and son (born January 2011). The family live in Corbridge, Northumberland. Malia had previously lived in Newton.
