= Dawn Thewlis =

Broadcaster and journalist

- Born: North East, England, UK
- Occupation: BBC Look North presenter

Dawn Thewlis is a broadcaster and journalist who is best known for presenting the north eastern version of the BBC regional news programme Look North and ITV Tyne Tees.

== Life and career ==
Thewlis joined ITV Tyne Tees in 1987 as a presenter and producer, until 2008. She joined the BBC in 2009, in which she has been a sports reporter alongside presenting the regional news programme BBC Look North (North East and Cumbria) ever since.

Thewlis has also presented various other programmes such as 'North East Tonight Election Special', 'Summer Sunday', 'A Current Affair', and 'The Football Show'.

In 2011, Thewlis hosted a gala dinner to celebrate rugby player Micky Ward's 13-year career.

In 2015, Thewlis was part of the judging panel for students at Northumbria University's Business School.

In 2020, Thewlis presented an award at the North East Royal Television Society Awards.

In 2023, Thewlis took part in a national journalists strike outside BBC Newcastle as cuts were set to take place across local services.

== Charity work ==
In 2008, Thewlis, alongside television colleague Pam Royle took part in the Butterwick Midnight Walk around Sedgefield Racecourse to raise funds for Butterwick Hospice.

== Personal life ==
Thewlis was born in and raised in Tyneside. She is married and has two sons. Her father was former Newcastle United football player and cricketer Joe Thewlis.

== Awards ==
In 2022, Thewlis won 'Best Presenter' at the North East Royal Television Society Awards.
