= Sherrie Eugene-Hart =

British television presenter

- Born: Sherrie Eugene; 10 June 1964 (age 62); Bristol, England
- Education: University of Bristol
- Occupations: TV Presenter, Sign Language Interpreter

Sherrie Eugene-Hart is a sign language interpreter and TV presenter based in the West of England and has held the position of Governor at University of the West of England and The City Academy Bristol.

== Early life and education ==
Eugene was born in Bristol where her parents had settled when they moved from the Caribbean in the 1960s. She learned British Sign language as a means to communicate with her sister, who was born deaf. She went to the University of Bristol to study English Literature and BSL British Sign Language. She qualified at the age of 23 years.

== News career ==
Eugene started working for HTV West (now ITV West Country) in 1982, becoming one of the first news interpreters for profoundly deaf people. She was one of the co-presenters of HTV News (West) until Autumn 2001, when she was replaced by Jenny Hull. After about fifteen years with HTV West, Eugene was increasingly working as a reporter and presenter on shows such as the Good Neighbour Show and the Vegetarian Cookery Show, specialising in community interest and social action series.

== Awards and accolades ==
Eugene has received several national awards, such as one for her documentary Windrush Generation; the Windrush Generation were those Caribbean people who were invited to live and work in Great Britain between 1948 and the 1960s. Eugene is also a former national Judo champion.

Eugene was chosen as one of a group of three to lead a prayer vigil during Pope Benedict XVI's visit to the UK in Hyde Park, London, on 18 September 2010. Eugene led prayers in English and British Sign Language.

== Personal life ==
Eugene is married to radio broadcaster, former Freshblood recording artist and Bristol Athletic FC chairman Patrick G. Hart. She is the patron of the charity "Childtime" which provides counselling services to children as well as Home Start and the Organisation for Sickle Cell Anemia (OSCAR).
