= Ian Payne (newsreader) =

British newsreader (born 1968)

- Born: Ian Robert Payne; 25 November 1968 (age 57); Ipswich, Suffolk, England
- Occupation: Presenter
- Years active: 1992–present
- Employer: ITV
- Children: 2

Ian Robert Payne (born 25 November 1968 in Ipswich, Suffolk) is an English presenter currently employed by ITV.

== Career ==
Prior to his TV work he studied sport at Northumbria Polytechnic and did a placement with TV Sport and Leisure (TSL) in 1988.

He appeared on an edition of Blockbusters in the early 1990s.

In 1992 he joined Tyne Tees Television as a sports assistant. Ten years later he became a sports presenter. On 25 September 2006, Payne was promoted to a news presenter on the now defunct South edition ITV News Tyne Tees. On 13 February 2009 the final North and South editions of the programme aired. On 25 February 2009, ITV Tyne Tees and ITV Border merged news output whilst the respective programme titles were retained, Payne now presents both ITV News Tyne Tees and Lookaround. Payne signed a new contract until 2030.

== Awards ==
In 2008 Ian was honoured by Northumbria University for ‘Distinguished Services to Sport’ and in 2009 he was named ‘Best Presenter’ by the Royal Television Society North East and Cumbria.

== Personal life ==
He has two sons. In an interview Payne said the aspect of his job he enjoys the most is current affairs, sport and the passion he has for the North East.
