= Catherine Jacob (journalist) =

English journalist (born 1976)

- Born: 1976 (age 49–50); Sunderland, England
- Occupations: Broadcast journalist and news presenter

Catherine Maura Jacob (born 1976 in Sunderland, England) is a freelance broadcast journalist and news presenter.

== Early life ==
Jacob was educated at St. Anthony's Girls School in Sunderland and graduated from Durham University with a degree in Modern Languages in 1999.

== Career ==
In her early career she was a traffic reporter for BBC Newcastle and news correspondent for BBC Look North.

In September 2000, she moved to ITN as an editorial trainee, working across Channel 4 News, ITV News and 5 News. She became a fully-fledged producer and later reporter for ITV News in 2002.

From 2004, she was the Royal Correspondent for 5 News and from 2007 the Environment Correspondent for Sky News. From 2010 she would become a freelance news correspondent for Sky News until April 2013.

In 2013, she appeared as a news presenter for Granada Reports, ITV News Tyne Tees and Lookaround.

She is the youngest journalist ever to be awarded the Golden Nymph for Best News Story at the Monte Carlo film and TV awards for an investigation into child labor in the ship breaking yards of Bangladesh.
