= Nicol Nicolson =

Nicol Nicolson is a Scottish broadcast journalist.

He formerly worked at ITV Border and later STV Central. Prior to becoming a journalist, he was a Marketing Manager with VisitScotland, the national tourism agency.

His reporting work encompassed hard news, sport and lighter feature stories for STV News as well as occasional political items for Politics Now. He was also a regular presenter of short bulletins for East Central Scotland and the rest of the region.

Nicolson left STV in September 2009. He joined CNN International in Hong Kong, where he worked behind the scenes on World Business Today and News Stream, regularly contributing features and commentary to the latter's popular blog.

In early 2013 he began a new role producing CNN International's Global Exchange in Abu Dhabi. He now produces Connect the World with Becky Anderson.
