= UKWA =

Radio station in Perth, Western Australia

UK Radio
Australia
- Broadcast area: Perth, Western Australia
- Frequencies: 87.6 FM (Two Rocks to Butler); 87.8 FM (Butler to Currambine)

Programming
- Language: English

History
- First air date: July 2014

Links
- Website: Official website

UK Radio (alternate name is UKWA) is a local radio station previously broadcasting on FM from Two Rocks to Currambine areas of Perth, Western Australia. It was primarily aimed at the UK expat community living in the area.

== History ==
UKWA the radio station was launched in July 2014 with the FM stations of 88FM in Yanchep and 87.8FM in Burns Beach/Kinross areas.

In July 2015, 87.8FM in Burns Beach/Kinross areas was expanded to Mindarie, Jindalee, Clarkson, Ridgewood, Quinns Rocks, Merriwa, Tamala Park, Butler and parts of Alkimos.

After the end of UKWA Yanchep's 88FM, it was replaced by Vision Christian Radio as at January 2016.

On 23 March 2018, the station started broadcasting on 87.6 FM to Butler, Jindalee, Alkimos and Eglinton.

In September 2018, Yanchep/Two Rocks was expanded on 87.6FM.

In December 2018, UKWA Radio rebranded UK Radio.

In July 2021, UK Radio was on 87.6 FM in Yanchep, Two Rocks, Alkimos, Eglinton, Jindalee, and Butler and 87.8FM in Burns Beach, Kinross, Currambine, Iluka, Mindarie, Clarkson, Ridgewood, Quinns Rocks, Merriwa, Tamala Park and parts of Butler.

In April 2023 the previous UKWA frequencies were absorbed into the Oz Urban Radio network: www.OzUrbanRadio.com
