= Pip Tomson =

English journalist and presenter

- Pip Tomson presenting The Best Secretary on Tyneside Award September 2009
- Born: Philippa Tomson; 30 August 1977 (age 48); York, Yorkshire, England
- Occupations: Journalist and presenter
- Known for: Good Morning Britain; ITV News Tyne Tees

Philippa "Pip" Tomson (born 30 August 1977) is an English journalist and television presenter best known for her work with Good Morning Britain and ITV News Tyne Tees.

== Career ==
At the age of 18 she trained as a journalist and later became the chief reporter for the Express & Star in Wolverhampton.

In March 2002 she joined ITV News Central on ITV Central – newsreading bulletins, co-presenting alongside Bob Warman and reporting in the West Midlands region. In addition, she worked as a freelancer with Central Extra on ITV Central, ITV News London on ITV London, the ITV News Channel and Westcountry Live on ITV Westcountry.

On 25 September 2006, she became a co-presenter of ITV News Tyne Tees on ITV Tyne Tees. On 2 February 2009 she was redeployed as the weather presenter and a fill-in presenter of ITV News Tyne Tees and Lookaround for ITV Tyne Tees & Border.

From August 2008 until July 2011, she was an occasional co-presenter of Tony Horne in the Morning on Metro Radio. In April 2009, she guest co-presented on Real Radio North East alongside former ITV Tyne Tees colleague Jonathan Morrell.

From February 2009 until August 2011, she was a columnist for the Sunday Sun. She has worked as a features writer for the Daily Mail.

In November and December 2009, Tomson appeared as a weather presenter for GMTV, and on 29 December 2010 for Daybreak on ITV Breakfast.

On 1 May 2012 she joined Sky News as a news presenter and reporter.

In October 2013, she returned to Daybreak (now Good Morning Britain) as a news correspondent. For a time she was also a reporter for ITV News London.

In June 2023, Tomson joined GB News as a presenter and reporter, later departing in April 2024.

== Awards ==
- Presenter of the Year, Royal Television Society North East and the Border (2010 and 2012).

== Charity interests ==
Tomson is a member of the Cash for Kids charity. She was also the 2008 vice-president for the Tsunami Fund Raising charity, when she helped to raise money for students at the Ban Kamala School, devastated by the 2004 Indian Ocean tsunami.

She is a patron of Someone Cares and in 2009 took part in the Great North Run to raise funds and awareness for the charity. In 2010 she ran the event for Brysons Animal Refuge and Ark on the Edge animal sanctuary, while in 2012 she ran again in aid of Ark on the Edge and also the Children's Heart Unit at the Freeman Hospital in Newcastle upon Tyne.
