= Asker Jeukendrup =

Dutch nutritionist and physionlogist

- Born: 1969 (age 56–57); Roermond, Netherlands
- Citizenship: Netherlands
- Education: Maastricht University
- Awards: Danone Chair in Nutrition at the Free University of Brussels (2005)
- Scientific career
- Fields: Sports Nutritionist, Exercise Physiologist

Asker Jeukendrup is a sports nutrition scientist and an Ironman triathlete.

== Academic career ==
Following an MSc in Human Movement Sciences at Maastricht University in the Netherlands he completed his PhD in 1997 at the same university studying aspects of carbohydrate and fat metabolism during exercise. After postdoctoral research at the University of Texas in Austin, Jeukendrup became the youngest professor at the University of Birmingham at the age of 35. He was a Professor of Exercise Metabolism at the University of Birmingham for over 12 years. He also served as a Director of the Human Performance Lab at the same university. Jeukendrup has authored several books on sports nutrition and over 200 peer reviewed journal articles on exercise and sports nutrition.

His research interests include metabolic responses to exercise, regulation of carbohydrate and fat metabolism, sports nutrition, gastrointestinal complaints during exercise, training and over-training. He is a Fellow of the American College of Sports Medicine, a member of the New York Academy of Sciences, the Nutrition Society, the Physiological Society, the Biochemical Society, the American Diabetes Association and the European College of Sport Sciences.

== Post-academic career ==
In June 2011, Jeukendrup was named Global Senior Director of the Gatorade Sports Science Institute (GSSI) at PepsiCo. In addition to leading GSSI, he remained an adjunct professor at the University of Birmingham. In 2014 Jeukendrup started his own consulting company mysportscience ltd and now advises mostly teams and organisations. Jeukendrup is currently Head nutrition for the Dutch Olympic Committee (Performance Manager Nutrition TeamNL), JumboVisma Pro cycling, PSV Eindhoven, Red Bull Salzburg and the Red Bull Athlete Performance Center. Through blogs on Mysportscience.com he tries to bust myths in sports nutrition and provide evidence based and balanced information about nutrition. Jeukendrup is also co-founder of CORE Nutrition planning, an evidence based web based nutrition planner that provides detailed nutrition plans for races and training.

== Sporting competitions highlights ==
Jeukendrup has competed in 21 Ironman races, including 6 Ironman Hawaii triathlons. He won the Golden Gate Headlands Marathon in 2006 (3:22:48) and competed at the European and World Championships duathlons.

== Selected bibliography ==
- Textbook on Sports Nutrition (3rd edition) 2018
- Textbook on Sport Nutrition (2nd Edition) (2009)
- High-Performance Cycling (2002)

== Notable clients ==
- Team Jumbo-Visma
- Haile Gebrselassie - Ethiopian long-distance track and road running athlete, Olympic gold medalist.
- Chrissie Wellington - English triathlete holder of three world and championship records relating to ironman-distance triathlon races.
- Chelsea Football Club
- UK Athletics
- British Olympic Association
- Rabobank cycling team – a professional bicycle racing team, sponsored by the Rabobank.
