= Pam Royle =

British television presenter and journalist (born 1958)

- Born: Pamela June Royle; 30 June 1958 (age 66); Leicester, Leicestershire, England
- Occupation(s): Journalist, television presenter
- Years active: 1981–present
- Notable credits: ITV News Tyne Tees (1983, 1989– 2021); ITV News Lookaround (2009–2021)
- Spouse: Mike Walker
- Children: 2

Pamela June Royle (born 30 June 1958) is a British television journalist and presenter.

== Biography ==
Royle was born in Leicester, Leicestershire and was brought up mostly in North Yorkshire, but also in South Africa and Devon. After graduating with a joint honours degree in English Language and Literature from Newcastle University she taught English and Drama at a Chinese girls' school in Hong Kong. She has also worked in advertising for the Evening Gazette and as an assistant librarian at Britannia Royal Naval College in Dartmouth. Royle is a qualified Voice Coach with LLCMtd certification.

== Television ==
Royle began her TV career in Hong Kong, where she also trained the voices of radio and TV presenters. On her return to the UK, she joined Tyne Tees Television in 1983 as a weather presenter. She later moved to Central as a continuity announcer before working as a weather and travel correspondent for ITN World News covering Europe and, on the evening of the 1987 General Election, the world. After this, she joined ITN as a graduate news trainee.

By 1987, Royle had been recruited by LWT as part of the launch presenting team for LWT News. She later became a chief anchor for the short-lived LWT magazine programme, Friday Now. She rejoined Tyne Tees in 1989 as a main presenter of the nightly news magazine programme, Northern Life, alongside Paul Frost. She continued as the main presenter when the programme became Tyne Tees Today and also presented the North edition of Tyne Tees News.

In 1996, following the arrival of Mike Neville, she became a bulletin presenter and main stand-in anchor for Neville. Three years later, she presented the programme's short-lived lifestyle spin-off Primetime, which in spite of good ratings was cancelled after just four weeks on air.

She became the presenter of the North edition of North East Tonight in 2005 following the introduction of the two sub-regional versions of the programme. Royle moved to present the South edition in September 2006. The separate North and South editions ended on 13 February 2009.

From 25 February 2009, Royle additionally presented Lookaround on ITV Border following a merger of the news operations of ITV Tynes Tees and Border.

In January 2013 North East Tonight was relaunched as ITV News Tyne Tees.

Alongside her work on the news, Royle has worked on a number of other regional programmes on ITV Tyne Tees including Your Town on the Telly, Whether or Not with Bob Johnson, Northern Skies and North East Today. In January 2009 she presented the feature series Our Gardens which aired on both editions of North East Tonight.

For more than 20 years Royle was Mother of the Chapel for ITV Tyne Tees and latterly ITV Border for the National Union of Journalists, representing members in all areas of their work and negotiating at national level on their behalf.

Royle celebrated 21 years as a newsreader in the North East in September 2010.

In 2018, Royle reduced her workload from five to four days.

Royle retired from ITV on 26 March 2021.

== Charity work ==
Royle is a patron of the Great North Air Ambulance Service (GNAAS), North East Ladies Day (NELD), Durham St John Ambulance, radio stations TFM and Greatest Hits Radio Teesside's "Cash for Kids", Evening Chronicle's "Sunshine Fund", and Evening Gazette's "Make a Child Smile". Royle also helped to promote the work of the Salvation Army for sixteen years and was a member of the advisory board.

== Personal life ==
Royle is married to Mike Walker and together they have two children; Philippa and Lawrence. She lives near Darlington.

Royle was appointed a Deputy Lieutenant of County Durham in 2002 and made a Fellow of Sunderland University in 2015.

She is a member of the Institute of Advanced Motorists and Royal Yachting Association, with qualifications in personal watercraft, radio operation and powerboats.
