= Television Centre, Newcastle upon Tyne =

Former headquarters of Tyne Tees Television

The Television Centre
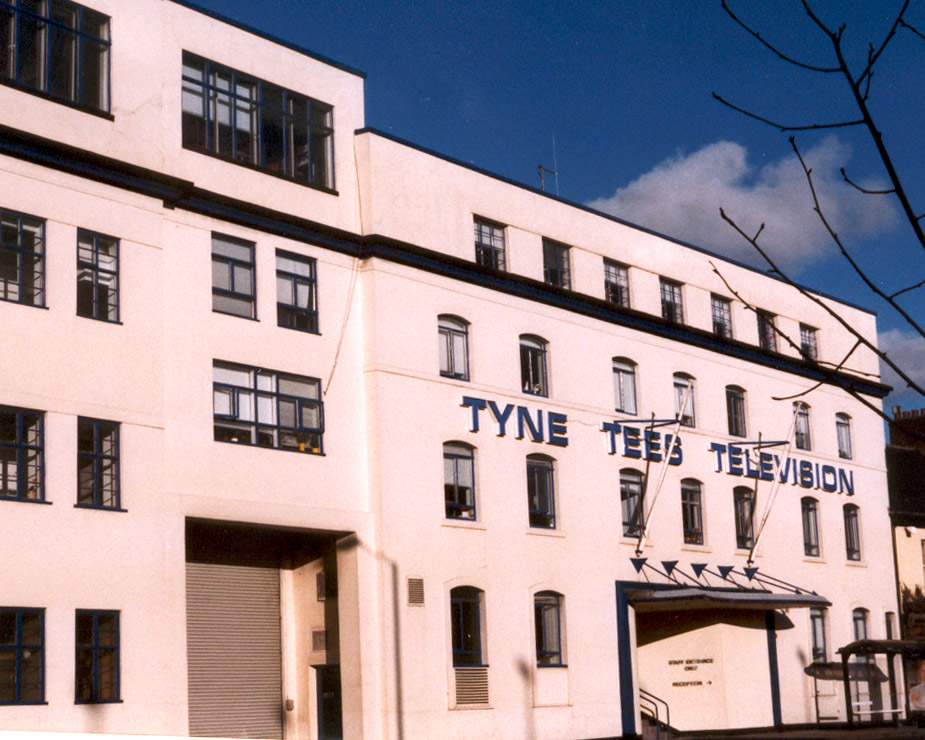
- The Studio building in 1999

- Location within Tyne and Wear
- Alternative names: City Road

General information
- Type: Television studios
- Location: On City Road in the centre of Newcastle. Access from to offices and Studios 1-4 were separate to Studio 5., City Road, Newcastle upon Tyne, NE1 2AL
- Coordinates: 54.972212°N 1.59799°W
- Inaugurated: 1959
- Destroyed: March 2010
- Demolished: November 2009
- Owner: Tyne Tees Television

The Television Centre, Newcastle upon Tyne, also known by the street name City Road, was the headquarters and primary studio complex of the ITV licensee for the North East region, Tyne Tees Television, between 1959 and 2005.

== History ==
=== Early years ===
The studios were originally created from two furniture warehouses that had been purchased by the company in 1958 following their acquisition of the franchise. The warehouses were gutted, with the shell of the building being fitted out with studios, galleries, scenery block and offices for the company. Upon completion in 1959, four studios were fitted into the building. The practice of buying an older building and fitting it out as a studio complex was in fact a very common element of early ITV stations. Of the original companies, all with the exception of Granada, Westward and Border, converted existing buildings rather than building purpose built studios. The location was deliberately chosen by the company because of its proximity to the telephone exchange in Carliol Square, as television signals to and from other ITV stations were relayed by land-line from the studios to the switching centre. The cost would have significantly increased if the connection was over a mile.

=== 1980s Heyday ===
In 1981, Tyne Tees built another studio - Studio 5, to cope with extra demand for programming for the soon to be created Channel 4. The extension was designed by Ryder & Yates and had the appearance of metal on the outside. The public entrance to the new studio was through a covered walkway from City Road, rather than by the closest road at the rear of the complex. This covered walkway, known as the 'Tube' inspired the name of the music programme shown on Channel 4. Many network programmes were created here, and local programming was also produced. Production of network shows slowed after 1993, when Tyne Tees became part of Yorkshire-Tyne Tees Television.

=== ITV Mergers and Decline ===
The merger was initiated due to the large costs incurred by both companies to retain their licences following the 1991 franchise round. Immediately following the merger, 150 employees were made redundant at City Road as part of cost-saving measures at YTTTV. The presentation departments, continuity announcers and numerous administrative and executive posts moved to The Leeds Studios, home of Yorkshire Television. In addition, some productions moved to the Leeds Studios, leaving only minor productions and the local news service at City Road. The decline of programme-making in Newcastle was accelerated in 1997 when Granada bought YTTTV.

Granada had previously made its intentions for City Road clear in the 1991 franchise round, in which Granada bid against Tyne Tees for the North East in the attempt to create one big Granada region covering the entire North of England. In these plans, Manchester would have been the centre of the operation, with Newcastle serving as a small news gathering operation. Following the merger, yet more departments were merged with those at Granada, and more productions were moved from City Road and The Leeds Studios to Granada's base at The Manchester Studios. The last major production was Countdown, while its regular home at the Leeds Studios were being refurbished.

=== Disappearance of Tyne Tees ===
On 28 October 2002, the Tyne Tees brand was removed from network programming, with its on-screen identity reduced to a sub-brand of ITV. The continuity announcers that had served the region from Leeds since 1993, were themselves being reduced to six from London for the whole country. The final announcement from Tyne Tees was as follows:

Well that’s just about it from me. As you may know our colleagues in London take over continuity from 9:25 this morning, so on behalf of our Northern Team, Helen, Neil, Maggie and Kerrie and all the past Tyne Tees announcers since 1959, this is Bob Preedy bidding you a fond farewell.

— Bob Preedy, Tyne Tees continuity announcer.

=== Closure of City Road ===
The final nail in the coffin was Granada PLC's merger with Carlton Communications to form ITV plc in 2004. This company now owned all the ITV franchises in England and Wales, and as such inherited the studio facilities of all these companies. Some facilities, like LWT's London base, Granada's Manchester base and Yorkshire's Leeds base were retained. Other facilities were sold off, such as Anglia's Magdalen Street Studio facility in Norwich and Carlton Central's Nottingham facility. However, other facilities were closed down with no prospect of sale. One was Meridian's Southampton base and the other was Tyne Tees' City Road complex. The studio's fate had been sealed, taking 30 jobs with it.

The final broadcast from City Road occurred on 1 July 2005 and was a final edition of North East Tonight. Mike Neville was joined in the studios by many of the Tyne Tees staff as they bid farewell to City Road. The following day, the news department and playout facilities were relocated to Tyne Tees new, much smaller, headquarters, Television House, at The Watermark in Gateshead. The new facilities are deliberately streamlined and are now home to ITV SignPost and ITV Border, following the 2009 merger of Border and Tyne Tees to form ITV Tyne Tees & Border.

City Road itself remained mainly empty after 2005, with a church briefly using Studio 5 in July 2006. However, the remainder of the site remained empty and neglected until November 2009, when demolition of the site began, starting with Studio 5 and ending with the main building along with the Egypt Cottage pub. It was all over by March 2010 with all areas of the site destroyed. The only parts of the site to remain were the former scenery store and Aerial House, a former office block that is now a standalone apartment block. This building was formerly topped by the distinctive TTTV transmission tower until its removal in 2017.

Student accommodation now occupies the site.

== Studios ==
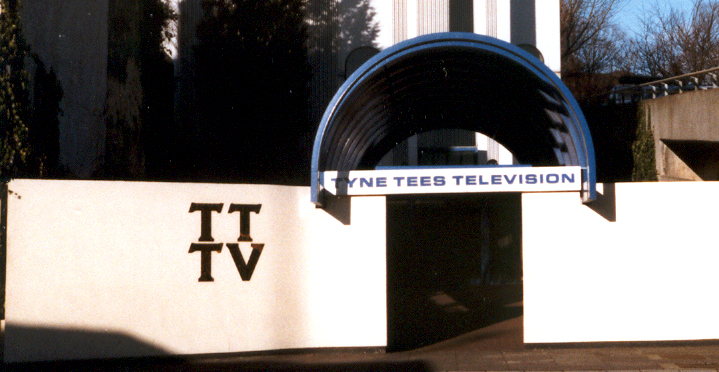
The entrance to Studio 5, nicknamed 'The Tube'.

The studio complex contained five studios of varying sizes and uses.

- Studio 1 - A large entertainment studio with capacity for studio audience. Most of the early productions were based here, and some more in the future. Located in the original building.
- Studio 2 - A smaller studio for secondary programming and magazine type programming. To save money, this studio originally shared equipment with other studios and the OB unit. Located in the original building.
- Studios 3 & 4 - Studios designed for use as in-vision continuity suites, news studio and interviews. Originally used Studio 3, but much was transferred to Studio 4 later on. Studio 4 was closed in 1996, and productions transferred back to Studio 3. Located in original building.
- Studio 5 - Extension added to cope with extra programming following the launch of Channel 4. Large studio with audience seating and accessed from a covered walkway known as the Tube.

Prior to 1981, the title 'Studio 5' was given to the two local pubs, the Egypt Cottage and the Rose and Crown by the Tyne Tees employees and differed depending on employee popularity.

== See also ==
- Tyne Tees Television
- ITV plc
