= Glen Oglaza =

British journalist

Glen Oglaza is a British journalist. He was previously a senior international correspondent for Independent Television News (ITN) and political correspondent for Sky News. He was based at Westminster, in Central London.

Whilst at ITN, he appeared on its flagship News at Ten and Channel 4 News programmes, reporting from over 30 countries, including the United States, the former Soviet Union and countries in the Middle East. He became Sky News' Political Correspondent in 1997. He is the author of two books of autobiography When I stories and More when I stories as well as several books of poetry.

== Education ==
Oglaza was educated at St Paul's School, an independent school for boys in Barnes in southwest London, followed by the University of Aberdeen, where he studied English.

== Life and career ==
Oglaza started his career at Metro Radio in Newcastle upon Tyne, where he stayed for three years. While at Metro Radio, Oglaza won an award at The New York Radio Festival awards.He then moved to London as a reporter for Independent Radio News, and six months later joined Independent Television News, where he was a correspondent, and latterly a Senior Correspondent. He became an ITN correspondent in Washington, D.C., Moscow and the Middle East.

During his ten years at ITN, he was the only reporter to have covered the fall of the Berlin Wall in 1989, Czechoslovakia's Velvet Revolution and the fall of Ceaucescu in Romania. In 1991, he spent a month with the Kurds of Northern Iraq during their uprising following the defeat of Saddam Hussein at the end of the 1990-91 Gulf War, and later that year, he reported on the collapse of the Soviet Union.

Oglaza won three RTS (news event) awards for the Fall of the Berlin Wall, the plight of the Kurds in the aftermath of the First Gulf War, and Dunblane. He was nominated for a BAFTA for his coverage of the London Poll Tax riot.

Whilst at ITN, and then at Sky News, Oglaza reported on the rise and ten-year premiership of Tony Blair, the 2007-2010 Government led by Gordon Brown, and the Coalition Government formed in 2010 by David Cameron and Nick Clegg. He left Sky News in 2013.

Oglaza has covered the World Economic Forum in Davos for Reuters for several years, interviewing Presidents, Prime Ministers and business leaders for a global audience. For several years, he was visiting professor of communications at the INSEAD Business School, and also works at The Royal College for Defence Studies and the UK Defence Academy.

== Awards ==
Oglaza and his reporting teams have won three RTS Awards, for their reporting of the Fall of the Berlin Wall in 1989,Dunblane massacre and for the 1990-91 Gulf War, and Oglaza was individually nominated for a BAFTA for his reporting of the London Poll Tax Riots.

== Family ==
Oglaza lives in North London and has two children.
