= ITV News Tyne Tees =

British regional television news programme (since 1959)

- Also known as: Good Morning Tyne Tees; North East Tonight (1996–2013); North East Today (1996–2013)
- Genre: Regional news
- Presented by: Amy Lea; Ian Payne
- Country of origin: United Kingdom
- Original language: English

Production
- Producers: ITV Tyne Tees & Border (2009–); ITV Tyne Tees (1959–2009)
- Production locations: The Watermark, Gateshead, (2005–); City Road, Newcastle upon Tyne, (1959–2005)
- Camera setup: Multi-camera
- Running time: 29 minutes (18:00 broadcast)

Original release
- Network: ITV1 (ITV Tyne Tees)
- Release: 1959 – present

Related
- ITV News; ITV Weather; Lookaround; Around the House; Northern Life (1976-1992)

ITV News Tyne Tees is a British television news service produced by ITV Tyne Tees & Border and broadcasting to the Tyne Tees region.

== Overview ==
The news service is produced and broadcast from studios at The Watermark, Gateshead with reporters also based at a Teesside office in Billingham. Both regional services (i.e ITV News Tyne Tees and Lookaround) use the same presenter(s) and studio/set, therefore one of the two programmes—depending on the day's news—is pre-recorded 'as live' shortly before broadcast.

The Tyne Tees news service transmits to Tyne and Wear, County Durham, Northumberland, Teesside, the Alston area of Cumbria, and parts of North Yorkshire.

In some (but not all) areas of North Yorkshire viewers have their aerials point to Bilsdale TV transmitter that broadcasts ITV News Tyne Tees, however most viewers in the county point their aerial to the Emley Moor or Oliver's Mount Transmitter to watch ITV News Calendar from Leeds. Viewers in Scarborough and some in Filey receive ITV News Calendar from the relay transmitter at Oliver's Mount.

== History ==
=== 1959–1996 ===
On 15 January 1959, the original Tyne Tees Television news service was launched with short evening bulletins and a weekly magazine programme, North East Roundabout which was broadcast each Friday. On 30 March 1964, it began airing nightly with the modified name North East Newsview. In 1969, the station's first colour television news programme was broadcast under the new name of Today at Six. From 6 September 1976, Tyne Tees' longest-running news programme Northern Life aired with notable presenters including Paul Frost and Pam Royle. On 5 October 1992 this was replaced by Tyne Tees Today (and from 31 March 1993 a sub-regional service would be known as Network North for South of the region only). In November 1995 both Tyne Tees Today and Network North were renamed to Tyne Tees News although separate editions for the North and South of the region were retained. In January 1996 this was joined by lifestyle programme, Tonight.

=== 1996–2005 ===
On Monday 2 September 1996, following the defection of the popular Mike Neville to Tyne Tees from the BBC's Look North after 32 years, North East Tonight was launched, replacing the two separate news services and the lifestyle programme, Tonight.

=== 2005–2009 ===
In August and November 2005, ITV Tyne Tees trialed sub-regional editions of North East Tonight.

- North: (Northumberland, Tyne and Wear and Northern County Durham), broadcast from the Pontop Pike and Chatton transmitters.
- South: (North Yorkshire, Tees Valley and Southern County Durham), broadcasting from the Bilsdale transmitter.

This was in turn following chief presenter Mike Neville's absence from July 2005.

Other bulletins including GMTV bulletins, weekday lunchtime, weekday late, and weekend early evening were pan-regional.

The sub-regional editions would become permanent from January 2006.

Mike Neville announced his retirement from the programme on 5 June 2006, after almost a year on sick leave.

=== 2009–2013 ===
In September 2007, ITV plc announced that Tyne Tees' newsroom would be merged with ITV Border, subject to Ofcom approval.

On 26 September 2008, broadcasting regulator Ofcom authorised ITV's plans to save £40 million a year by making regional programming cutbacks. These include axing mid-morning bulletins on weekdays and lunchtime bulletins at weekends, merging a number of regions and axing most non-news regional programmes.

As part of these cuts, taking place from November 2008 to February 2009, around 50 staff were made redundant or accepted voluntary redundancy at ITV Tyne Tees. On 16 December 2008, Press Gazette leaked that journalists were told that leaving collections were banned, along with leaving presentations and on-screen goodbyes. In a staff memo, head of news Catherine Houlihan cited the ban was because of the large number of staff being made redundant at the station. One worker told Press Gazette that "morale is at rock bottom". The main anchors were announced as Ian Payne and Pam Royle.

The last sub-regional editions of North East Tonight aired on 13 February 2009.

ITV Tyne Tees & Border was formed on 25 February 2009, with Lookaround and North East Tonight titles retained for the 6 pm programme and late bulletin each weekday, whilst shorter bulletins were known simply as Tyne Tees & Border News.

The remaining “Tyne Tees” only elements were:

- The opening 15 minutes of the main 6 pm programme.
- Full late night bulletins on weeknights, following ITV News at Ten.
- Localised weather forecasts.

On 14 January 2013, the Tyne Tees news service was relaunched and rebranded as ITV News Tyne Tees.

=== 2013–present ===
On 14 June 2013, it was reported ITV would restore a full 30-minute edition of Lookaround and shorter bulletins for Border viewers, leading to separation of the Tyne Tees and Border news programmes. Ofcom approved the plans a month later, allowing Tyne Tees to reintroduce its own full regional news service. The minutage requirement for the main evening programme was reduced from 30 to 20 minutes, although ITV retain a full half-hour with the option of using some aggregate content from other regions. Daytime and weekend bulletins for the Tyne Tees region were reintroduced on Monday 16 September 2013.

From March 2020, the news service was affected by the COVID-19 pandemic; the running time of all short bulletins was reduced and the main 6pm programme was fronted by a single presenter instead of two. The main 6pm programme returned to having two presenters on 23 November 2020, with a slightly modified studio layout to allow for social distancing.

In March 2021, Amy Lea would succeed the retiring Pam Royle.

== Notable current on air staff ==
- Helen Carnell
- Tori Lacey
- Amy Lea
- Ian Payne

== Former notable on air staff ==
- Emma Baker (ITV News Anglia)
- Edward Baran
- Kay Burley (Sky News)
- Kerrie Gosney (Calendar)
- Pete Graves (Sky Sports News)
- Kathy Secker (deceased)
- Catherine Jacob
- Bob Johnson
- Phil Lavelle (CGNT America)
- Debbie Lindley
- Lucy Meacock (Granada Reports)
- Jon Mitchell
- Jonathan Morrell (BBC Radio Newcastle)
- Mike Neville (deceased)
- Pam Royle
- Kate Silverton
- Philippa Tomson (GB News)

Main presenters history
Years	Presenter 1	Presenter 2	Opt(s)
1996–2005	Mike Neville		Tyne Tees pan-regional
2005	Various		Tyne Tees pan-regional
2006	Jonathan Morrell	Pam Royle	Tyne Tees North sub-region
2006	Andy Kluz	Kim Inglis	Tyne Tees South sub-region
2006–2008	Jonathan Morrell	Philippa Tomson	Tyne Tees North sub-region
2006–2009	Ian Payne	Pam Royle	Tyne Tees South sub-region
2009–2021	Ian Payne	Pam Royle	Tyne Tees pan-regional / Lookaround
2021–	Ian Payne	Amy Lea	Tyne Tees pan-regional / Lookaround
