= Northern Life (TV programme) =

Regional news for North East England

- Genre: Regional News
- Presented by: See below
- Country of origin: United Kingdom

Production
- Producer: Tyne Tees Television
- Running time: 30, 35 or 60 minutes

Original release
- Network: Tyne Tees Television
- Release: 6 September 1976 – 2 October 1992

Related
- North East Tonight

Northern Life is a regional news programme on Tyne Tees Television, which aired from 6 September 1976 to 2 October 1992. The programme was aired at 6pm on weekday evenings, for some years at 6.25pm, and ran for 30, 35 or 60 minutes at various points in its run.

The programme was the successor to Today at Six, and was replaced by Tyne Tees Today in 1992 following the takeover by Yorkshire Television. The programme had a light-hearted approach and was notable for Paul Frost's monologues towards the end of many editions.

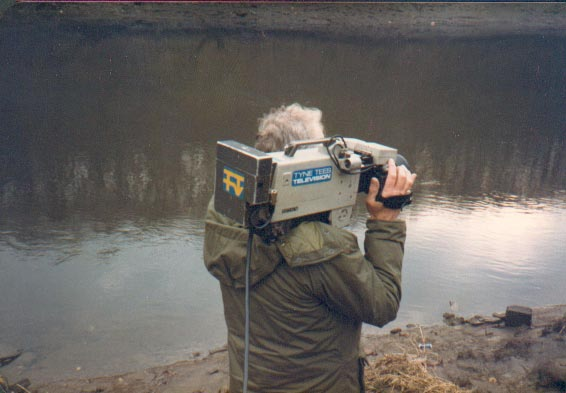
Northern Life ENG cameraman on the banks of the River Wear (1984)

For much of its run, Northern Life had a sub-regional news service integrated into the second part of the programme, with the south of the Tyne Tees region served by the Middlesbrough studio, anchored by Teesside-based news reporters such as Andy Kluz. The programme included a brief summary with signing and subtitles for the deaf and this aired towards the end of the programme. This was not included in the replacement programme.

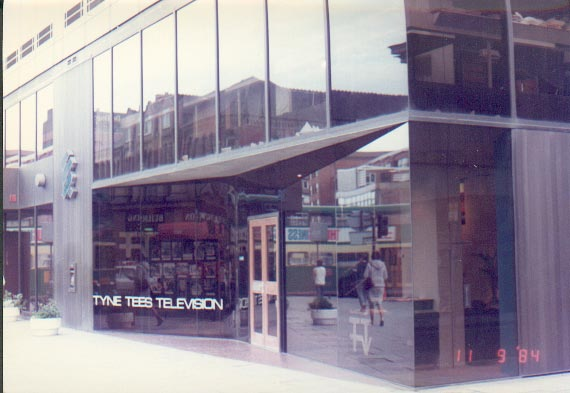
Middlesbrough Newsroom (1984)

Presenters of the show included Bill Steel (the original anchor), Tom Coyne, Paul Frost, Jane Wyatt, Pam Royle, Eileen McCabe, Stuart McNeil and Sheila Matheson.

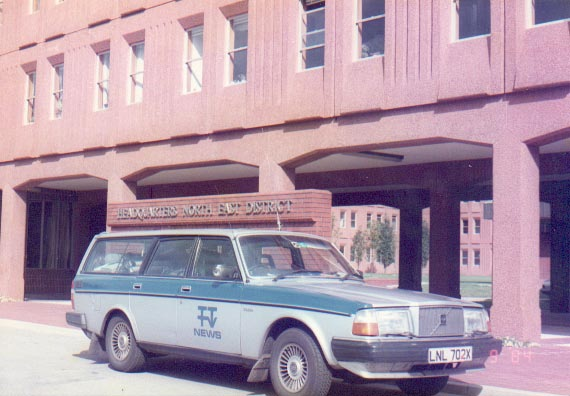
TTTV ENG crews often travelled into YTV territory. This news unit was spotted at Imphal Barracks, York (September 1984)
