= Jeremy Nicholas (broadcaster) =

English radio broadcaster

Jeremy Nicholas is a Sony award-winning TV and radio broadcaster.

== Radio ==
Nicholas has presented The World Today on the BBC World Service, as well as many shows on BBC Radio 5 Live, Talksport, and Greater London Radio, on which his morning show with Claire McDonnell won a Sony Award for Best Breakfast Talk/News show. He commentated on the tragic Nottingham Forest versus Liverpool F.C. match at Hillsborough in 1989, the so-called Hillsborough disaster, for BBC Radio Nottingham.

== Television ==
Nicholas worked in TV news for the BBC after spells with ITV and Channel Five. He was the 2012 Summer Paralympics Athletics announcer for the ParalympicSportTV.

== Other work ==
Nicholas was the stadium announcer for West Ham United at Upton Park from 1998 to September 2013. He resigned his post having been asked by the West Ham United board to take a 60% cut in his match-day fee.

He now works as a professional speaker and speaking coach and became a Fellow of the Professional Speaking Association UK & Ireland in 2012. In 2015, he was awarded the association's Professional Speaking Award of Excellence.
