= BBC Look North (North East and Cumbria) =

British TV regional news programme (since 1959)

- Title card used since April 2022
- Theme music composer: David Lowe
- Country of origin: United Kingdom
- Original language: English

Production
- Producers: BBC News; BBC North East and Cumbria
- Production locations: Broadcasting Centre, Newcastle upon Tyne, England
- Camera setup: Multi-camera
- Running time: 30 minutes (main 6:30 pm programme); 10 minutes (1:30 pm and 10:30 pm programmes); Various (during weekends and Breakfast)

Original release
- Network: BBC One North East and Cumbria
- Release: 5 January 1959 – present

BBC Look North is the BBC's regional television news service for North East England, Cumbria and parts of North Yorkshire. The service is produced and broadcast from the BBC Broadcasting Centre on Barrack Road in Newcastle upon Tyne with district newsrooms based in Carlisle, Middlesbrough and York.

== Reception ==
The programme can be watched in any part of the UK (and Europe) from Astra 2E on Freesat channel 956 and Sky channel 955. It no longer broadcasts on analogue, since the digital switchover in September 2012, and digital terrestrial from the Bilsdale, Caldbeck, Chatton and Pontop Pike transmitters. The latest edition of Look North is also available to watch on the BBC iPlayer for 24 hours after broadcast, like the BBC's other news bulletins.

== Coverage area ==
The Newcastle programme covers the editorial areas of Radio Newcastle, Radio Tees and Radio Cumbria. Due to the size of North Yorkshire, the listenership of Radio York is covered by the geographically multitudinous Look North programmes from both Newcastle and Leeds.

The programme is available online through BBC iPlayer. In some (but not all) areas of North Yorkshire have their aerials pointing to the Bilsdale TV transmitter that broadcast the Newcastle edition of Look North, however most viewers in the county point their aerials to either the Emley Moor or Oliver's Mount transmitters to watch the Leeds edition of Look North. Viewers in Whitby received the Newcastle edition from the local relay transmitter which is transmitted from the Bilsdale TV transmitter while Scarborough and Filey viewers receive the Leeds edition from the relay transmitter at Oliver's Mount.

For viewers on Freesat, northern areas of North Yorkshire (DL, TS, and YO21/22 postcodes) are allocated Look North from Newcastle on BBC1 and ITV News Tyne Tees. YO7 and YO62 postcodes are allocated BBC Yorkshire and ITV Tyne Tees news services.

Viewers in the southern parts of Cumbria, such as Barrow-in-Furness and South Lakeland receive the BBC North West programme North West Tonight which broadcast from Salford. The areas receive their TV aerials from the Winter Hill TV transmitter and other relay transmitters.

== History ==
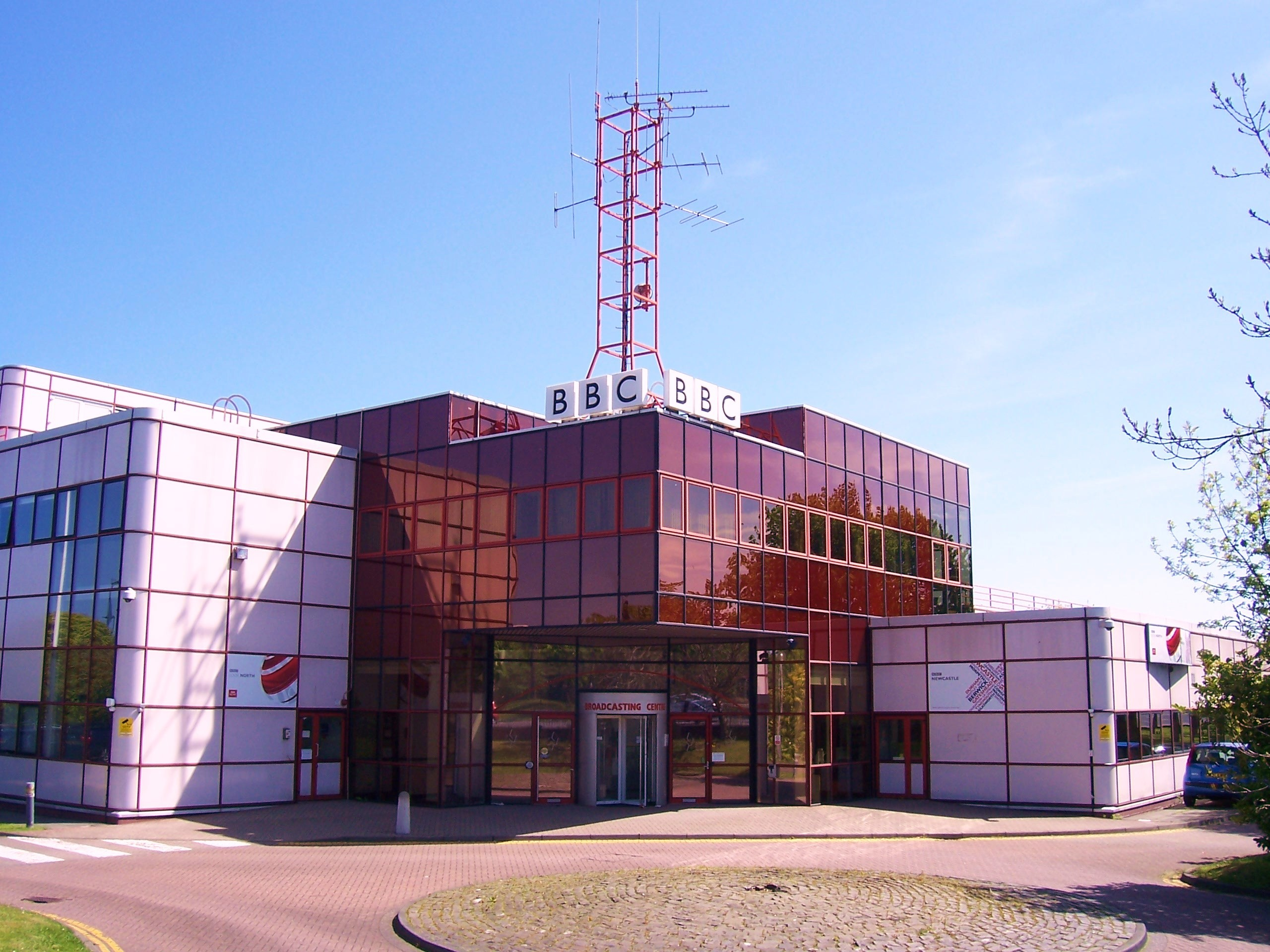
The "Pink Palace" - the studio and office complex of BBC Look North and BBC Radio Newcastle

Prior to the start of Look North, the BBC television region for the North East and Cumbria launched at 6.10 pm on 5 January 1959 from studios at 54 New Bridge Street in Newcastle City Centre. The region began receiving its own nightly news bulletins, originally presented by George House and Tom Kilgour.

Previously, the area was served by a pan-regional bulletin from Manchester entitled News from the North, broadcast across the whole of Northern England from 30 September 1957 onwards.

The new local bulletins from Newcastle were launched ten days before the opening of rival ITV station Tyne Tees Television in the North East (Border Television, serving Cumbria, opened in September 1961).

Three years after the launch of the television service, the bulletins were expanded to 20 minutes and relaunched as a daily magazine programme, Home at Six, presented by Frank Bough.

After Bough left to join BBC Sport in 1964, Home at Six was relaunched with a new name and a new presenter - Mike Neville, an actor and continuity announcer for Tyne Tees Television who had been anchor of North East Newsview, a nightly regional news programme, for only a few months. Neville soon became a household name and spent the next thirty-two years at the BBC in Newcastle, anchoring Look North as well as making regular appearances on Nationwide.

For a short period in the late 1980s, Cumbria was switched to the BBC North West region and began receiving North West Tonight instead of Look North, along with a short lunchtime news opt-out. Look North returned to Cumbria on 27 September 1992.

The North East and Cumbria region was reformed after campaigning by viewers in Cumbria that they were being overlooked in favour of news from the more populous areas of the north west, such as Greater Manchester and Merseyside.

It was during this time that on 16 January 1988, BBC North East moved to brand new purpose built studios nicknamed 'The Pink Palace' on Barrack Road in Spital Tongues, along with Radio Newcastle.

One of the programme's most infamous news stories was covered on 20 June 1991, when council planning officer Harry Collinson was shot dead by Albert Dryden in front of a Look North camera crew in Butsfield. Reporter Tony Belmont was wounded and the footage was broadcast unedited on that evening's programme.

In 1996, Neville left the BBC after 32 years to re-join Tyne Tees Television to present their flagship evening news programme North East Tonight. Look North underwent major changes with new presenters Carol Malia and John Lawrence (both former reporters for Tyne Tees) introduced to the programme. Malia is now the main solo anchor, alongside sports presenter Dawn Thewlis, another ex-Tyne Tees journalist.

== Broadcast times ==
On weekdays, Look North broadcasts six three-minute opt-outs during BBC Breakfast at 27 minutes past and 3 minutes to each hour. A ten-minute lunchtime programme follows at 1:30 pm with the main half-hour edition at 6:30 pm and a ten-minute late update is shown at 10:30 pm, following the national BBC News bulletins at 1 pm, 6 pm and 10 pm.

Look North also airs three bulletins during the weekend: early evening bulletins on Saturday and Sunday and a late night bulletin on Sundays. The times of these bulletins usually vary.

== Presenters ==
News

- Carol Malia – Main presenter (Monday–Wednesday) and Wednesday lates
- Dawn Thewlis

Weather

- Paul Mooney
- Jennifer Bartram (until September 2025)

== Former on-air team ==
Person	BBC Look North position(s)	Current position(s)
Mike Neville	Newsreader	Neville died in 2017
Jeff Brown	Newsreader / Sports presenter	Left BBC Look North in May 2024
Chris Eakin	Reporter / newsreader	Became a newsreader on the BBC News channel until he left the BBC in 2015
Chris Jackson	Reporter / newsreader	Went on to present regional current affairs show Inside Out
Hannah Bayman	Weather presenter	Became a reporter for BBC News channel
Owain Wyn Evans	Weather presenter	Now presents the early breakfast show on BBC Radio 2

== See also ==
BBC North East and Cumbria's rival regional news programmes.

- ITV News Tyne Tees which covers news stories from County Durham, Northumberland, parts of North Yorkshire, Teesside and Tyne and Wear.
- Lookaround which covers news stories from Cumbria, Dumfries and Galloway and the Scottish Borders (on the western side).
