= Mike Neville (newsreader) =

British broadcaster (1936–2017)

Mike Neville MBE
- Neville in 2005
- Born: James Armstrong Briggs; 17 October 1936; Willington Quay, Northumberland, England
- Died: 6 September 2017 (aged 80); Gateshead, England
- Years active: 1950–2006
- Spouse: Pamela Edwards (m. 1962)
- Children: 1

Michael Neville, MBE (born James Armstrong Briggs, 17 October 1936 – 6 September 2017) was a British broadcaster, best known as a presenter on regional TV news in north-east England in a 43-year career with the BBC and ITV franchisee Tyne Tees Television. In 1990, Neville was awarded the MBE for services to broadcasting.

== Early life ==
Born as James Armstrong Briggs in Willington Quay, Northumberland on 17 October 1936 – to James Briggs, a labourer, and Mary – he attended the Addison Potter Infant and Junior School in Willington Quay and Stephenson Memorial Secondary School in Howdon.

His first job at the age of 15 was at the Northern Guild of Commerce and Chamber of Trade. He was subsequently a junior editorial assistant at the Daily Mail's Newcastle offices. In 1955, he began two years of National Service in Cyprus, where he rose to the rank of Corporal in the Wiltshire Regiment. After a short time as an insurance agent, he joined the repertory company of Newcastle Playhouse full-time in 1957 and changed his name to Michael Neville.

== Career ==
While Neville was working as an actor, the North East's independent television station – Tyne Tees Television – began broadcasting in January 1959. A few months later, Neville made his television debut, playing a policeman in Tyne Tees' children's programme Happy Go Lucky. He later appeared in a similar role in Under New Management, a locally produced pub sitcom produced by future Dad's Army co-creator David Croft and written by Johnny Speight.

After five years working in the theatre, Neville switched permanently to television in 1962 and joined Tyne Tees full-time as a continuity announcer, newsreader and reporter. In March 1964, he became the anchorman of the station's nightly news magazine programme, North East Newsview, but within a short time, he was approached by BBC North East to replace Frank Bough as the anchor of its rival news programme Look North.

Neville went onto anchor Look North for 32 years, becoming the longest serving main anchor of any BBC regional news programme. From 1969 to 1983, he became well known nationally for his contributions to the early evening magazine programme Nationwide – a programme he would go onto present occasionally. Despite achieving national fame, he turned down offers to move to London, preferring to stay in the North East of England.

At Look North, Neville and co-presenter George House (one of the BBC's first North East TV newsreaders) regularly incorporated Geordie into the programme, usually in comedy pieces pointing out the gulf between ordinary Geordies and officials speaking Standard English. They were also responsible for a series of recordings and theatre shows, beginning with Larn Yersel' Geordie, which attempted, not always seriously, to bring the Geordie dialect to the rest of the UK. The pair went on to compere the annual Geordierama shows at the Newcastle Festival, later televised locally by BBC North East and broadcast nationally on BBC Radio 4.

Away from the nightly regional news, Neville featured on a host of regional and networked programmes for the BBC – one such series, The Mike Neville Show (1975), was based on his experiences whilst completing National Service, in repertory theatre and on television. At a national level in the mid-1960s, he presented Come Dancing and the annual Miss United Kingdom contest. Other regional programmes included A Likely Story (1974), Friday North (1977), Mike on Friday (1980) and Phone in Now (1981). He also featured on A Song for Europe and the annual Children in Need telethon.

In 1989, Neville was caught by Noel Edmonds with a Gotcha on his BBC1 programme Noel's Saturday Roadshow. He was tricked into thinking he was filling seven minutes of airtime because there was a technical fault with the network feed screening Wogan. He was easily able to adapt to the situation and stay professional and was the only local anchorman in the UK to ever receive a Gotcha.

Nicholas Owen, a former Look North reporter who moved onto ITN, described Neville as his mentor in a 2004 newspaper article, remarking that, "He is a Geordie legend and has a towering reputation, in a way that no-one in national television does". Neville was appointed an MBE in the 1991 New Year Honours for services to broadcasting.

=== Return to Tyne Tees ===
In 1996, Neville was approached by Tyne Tees Television and offered a chance to return to the commercial station. Tyne Tees offered him his own hour-long news programme, North East Tonight with Mike Neville. Neville made the switch back to Tyne Tees, which coincided with a short-lived station rebrand from Tyne Tees to Channel 3 North East. Shortly after its launch, North East Tonight won the Royal Television Society's award for best regional news programme. In 1998, it won a World Service Medal in New York for "Best News Magazine Programme".

While at Tyne Tees, he revived his regional chat show, The Mike Neville Show and presented occasional specials including Christmas Past and the station's 40th anniversary celebrations in 1999.

In 2003, Neville received the Outstanding Contribution Award at the Tom Cordner North East Press Awards ceremony and two years later, Northumbria University conferred an honorary degree upon him.

Neville remained with Tyne Tees until shortly after the station moved to new smaller studios in Gateshead in July 2005 – at the time, he underwent an emergency operation to remove a blood clot from his leg. Despite intending to return, Neville announced his retirement from regional television news on 5 June 2006. By this point, he was Britain's longest serving TV presenter, having received a Unique Achievement award from the Royal Television Society in 2001.

Neville went on to make occasional guest appearances on TV and radio, including a BBC Four documentary celebrating regional television in July 2011. In February 2017, he was honoured again by the Royal Television Society in the North East with a special award to mark his 80th birthday.

== Personal life ==
He lived in Whickham with his wife Pamela Edwards, whom he married in 1962 after they met in repertory theatre in Blyth. They had a daughter, Carolyn.

On 6 September 2017, Neville's family announced he had died at the Queen Elizabeth Hospital in Gateshead, following a short illness caused by cancer.
