= David Whiteley =

British radio and television presenter

- Born: 4 May 1977 (age 49); Rochford, Essex, England
- Spouse: Amelia Reynolds
- Children: 2

David Whiteley (born 4 May 1977) is a British TV and radio presenter. He is the co-presenter of ITV News Anglia alongside Becky Jago.

Whiteley presented the regional BBC One programme Inside Out East until it was cancelled in 2020.

He has presented two BBC documentaries about Star Wars: The Galaxy Britain Built: Droids, Darth Vader and Lightsabers, and Toy Empire: The British Force Behind Star Wars Toys about the toymaker Palitoy.

In 2021, Whiteley replaced Jonathan Wills as co-presenter of ITV News Anglia.

== Personal life ==
Whiteley is married to BBC Look East presenter Amelia Reynolds. They have two daughters.

== Bibliography ==
- Whiteley, David (2019). The Galaxy Britain Built - The British Talent Behind Star Wars. BearManor Media. ISBN 9781629334981.
