= Emma Baker (journalist) =

British journalist and presenter

Emma Baker (born 1980) is a British television journalist and presenter employed by ITV Anglia as Head of News.

== Career ==
Baker’s ITV career began in June 2005 as a trainee journalist at ITV News London (ITN).

She joined regional news programme ITV News Anglia (ITV Anglia) in January 2006 as a news presenter and reporter where she was based in Cambridgeshire and Norfolk.

She made the headlines after she was shown joking with colleagues and checking her appearance, without realising she was live on air on the morning of Monday 15 January 2007. Anglia spokesman Jim Woodrow told the Press Gazette: "A switching error led to viewers seeing some light-hearted banter involving our presenter Emma Baker and our production team. There was nothing said which we feel might have upset the viewers."

In December 2013 she joined the regional current affairs programme Border Life (ITV Tyne Tees & Border), based in Edinburgh. She occasionally relief presented regional news programmes ITV News Tyne Tees and Lookaround.

In 2016, Baker was shortlisted for RTS Scotland's On Screen Personality of the Year.

In October 2018 she became acting co-presenter of regional news programme ITV News Channel TV (ITV Channel TV). A year later she became the Features Editor. In December 2020 she left the programme.

In October 2022 she returned to ITV News Anglia (ITV Anglia) and is now the Head of News.

== Personal life ==
Baker is fluent in French and German, having studied modern languages at Cambridge University. During this time, she spent a year working for The Independent and the BBC in Paris.

Baker grew up on a dairy and arable farm in Kent.
