= Helen Carnell =

English presenter and journalist

- Born: 8 February 1981 (age 45); Cornwall, England
- Education: Journalism
- Alma mater: University of Birmingham; University of Falmouth
- Occupations: Presenter; Journalist
- Employer: ITV Breakfast
- Notable credit(s): Daybreak; Good Morning Britain; ITV News Tyne Tees; Lookaround; Westcountry Live

Helen Carnell (née Pearson) (born 8 February 1981) is an English presenter and journalist employed by ITV Tyne Tees & Border.

== Background ==
Carnell is originally from Cornwall and has resided in Carlisle, Newcastle upon Tyne and Streatham at her time with ITV. Her interests as marathon running, solo travel, writing and textiles. Helen married in 2017.

== Broadcasting career ==
In 2003 Carnell began her career with Westcountry Live on ITV Westcountry as a reporter based in Truro. She later became a newsreader of the opt-outs for the South of the region. In 2007 she moved to Lookaround on ITV Border based in Carlisle, initially as a newsreader and reporter, a year later she was promoted to co-presenter of the main programme.

On 25 February 2009 she was reassigned with the creation of ITV Tyne Tees & Border and was the newsreader of news updates which air during Good Morning Britain. However, from January to October 2011 she was a news correspondent and weather presenter.

On 24 June 2013, Carnell joined Good Morning Britain (previously Daybreak) on ITV Breakfast as a news producer and reporter. In February 2016, she left Good Morning Britain to return to ITV Tyne Tees & Border as a news correspondent.
