= 103.4 FM =

FM radio frequency

The following radio stations broadcast on FM frequency 103.4 MHz:

== United Kingdom ==
- Capital North West and North Wales in Cheshire and North East Wales
- Downtown Radio in Newcastle, County Down
- Nation Radio North East in Sunderland and Wearside
- Greatest Hits Radio Cumbria & South West Scotland in Eyemouth and Whitehaven
- Greatest Hits Radio Scottish Borders & North Northumberland in Berwick-upon-Tweed
