= Fiona Armstrong =

Freelance Scottish television journalist (born 1956)

Fiona Armstrong, Lady MacGregor
- Born: 28 November 1956 (age 69); Preston, England
- Occupations: Journalist, newsreader, Lord Lieutenant
- Notable credit(s): BBC News, GMTV, ITV Border, ITN
- Spouses: Rodney Potts (m. 1988–2002) Sir Malcolm MacGregor (m. 2005)
- Children: 1

Fiona Armstrong, Lady MacGregor (born 28 November 1956) is a British television journalist and is Lord Lieutenant of Dumfries. She is also the author of several books and has written for newspapers and made television programmes on Scottish topics including fishing and Scottish clans.

== Early life ==
Armstrong was born in Preston, Lancashire. As a child she lived for ten years in Nigeria, where her father was in the colonial service. She became Lady MacGregor of MacGregor when she married clan chief Sir Malcolm Gregor Charles MacGregor, 7th Baronet (born 1959) in 2005. She has a daughter from her first marriage to Rodney Potts.

She studied German Literature at University College, London; while there, she edited the London Student newspaper.

== Career ==
She started her career in local radio, before joining the BBC news team in Manchester in 1983. She then moved to Border Television as a news reporter, before becoming a regular newsreader and presenter for the nightly regional news programme Lookaround. In March 1987, she switched to ITN as a reporter/newscaster on News at Ten, News at 5:45 and other bulletins.

In February 2009, ITV Tyne Tees & Border was launched, replacing ITV Tyne Tees and ITV Border. Armstrong was announced as Features Correspondent for the service on a freelance basis. Her work took her to Cambodia to report on the work of land mine charities and to West Africa to cover the work of the Mercy Ships. Armstrong returned to network television news on 15 February 2010 as a presenter for the BBC News Channel. She went on to present Border Life, a current affairs programme for ITV Border. While working as a journalist for the BBC News Channel, Armstrong interviewed the civil rights activist and writer Darcus Howe on the subject of the street disturbances in England in summer 2011. During the interview on 9 August 2011, studio-based Armstrong asserted: "You are not a stranger to riots yourself, I understand, are you? You have taken part in them yourself." Howe denied that he had ever taken part in riots and was clearly offended. The BBC later issued a qualified apology to Darcus Howe for Armstrong's accusation.

She is on the board of the University of Central Lancashire as well as being a fellow there. She is Chairman of the Clan Armstrong Trust and a judge of Cumbria Book of the Year. She is also patron of the "Bookmark" book festival and a deputy lieutenant of Dumfriesshire. She is currently writing a book on Queen Victoria and a family connection to Scotland.

Her appointment as Lord Lieutenant of Dumfries was announced on 26 January 2016.

Honorary titles
Preceded by Jean Douglas Tulloch	Lord Lieutenant of Dumfries; 2016–present	Incumbent
