= Tim Backshall =

Tim Backshall may refer to:

- Tim Backshall (television presenter), English television presenter with ITV
- Tim Backshall (credit analyst), co-editor of the financial website Zero Hedge
