= Tim Backshall (television presenter) =

British television presenter and journalist

Timothy Backshall
- Employer: ITV Channel
- Known for: Television news presenting
- Title: News Presenter, Journalist

Timothy “Tim” Backshall is an English television presenter and journalist, currently employed by ITV Channel.

== Biography ==
Backshall was originally from Harrogate, North Yorkshire. He then lived near Penrith, Cumbria, with his wife and daughter. He is now in Jersey in the Channel Islands.

== Television ==
He joined ITV Border in 1997 as a co-presenter of Lookaround. In February 2009 he was redeployed as a correspondent, based in Carlisle, as part of the newly formed ITV Tyne Tees & Border news service. He transferred to ITV News in the Channel Islands in 2023.
