= ITV News =

British TV network

- Logo used since 2013
- Type: Television news
- Genre: National and international news
- Founded: 22 September 1955 (as ITN)
- Founder: Independent Television Authority
- Headquarters: London, England
- Area served: United Kingdom
- Key people: Michael Jermey (ITV Director of News & Current Affairs); Guy Phillips (Editor, ITV News regions); Rachel Corp (Editor)
- Parent: ITN, ITV plc
- Divisions: ITV Regional News
- Website: itv.com/news

ITV News is the branding of news programmes on the British news television channel of ITV. ITV has a long tradition of television news. Independent Television News (ITN) was founded to provide news bulletins for the network in 1955, and has since continued to produce all news programmes on ITV. The channel's news coverage has won awards from the Royal Television Society, Emmy Awards and BAFTAs. Between 2004 and 2008, the ITV Evening News held the title of "RTS News Programme of the Year". The flagship ITV News at Ten has won numerous BAFTA awards, and also being named "RTS News Programme of the Year" in 2011, 2015, 2021 and 2022.

ITV News has the second-largest television news audience in the United Kingdom, second only to BBC News (and followed by other broadcasters such as Sky News, Channel 4 News and Channel 5 News). Initially, all national news programmes on ITV carried ITN's own brand. As the ITV network consolidated from the mid 1990s onwards, ITN branding of news programmes was eventually dropped on 8 March 1999 following the introduction of the ITV News brand. ITN remains the producer of all the national ITV News programmes.

== History ==
The original ITN logo, as used between 22 September 1955 to 15 November 1969

=== 1955–1969: Early years ===
ITN was set up by the Independent Television Authority to provide a new type of news service for the upcoming commercial television service Independent Television (ITV). Both ITN and ITV were launched on 22 September 1955, and the news service immediately broke new ground by introducing in-vision newscasters and reporter packages (incidentally, the first roster of regular ITN newscasters and reporters included marathon runner Christopher Chataway, Robin Day, and Reginald Bosanquet).

The unique, probing reporting style of Robin Day caused shock among politicians, finding themselves questioned continually for information – this had never been the case with the BBC. ITN also boasted the first British female newsreader, Barbara Mandell, in 1956. Into the 1960s, reporters such as George Ffitch, Alastair Burnet, Gordon Honeycombe, Huw Thomas and Sandy Gall emerged as aspiring newscasters, under the leadership of editor Geoffrey Cox.

The original ITN logo, featuring a large "T" flanked either side by "I" and "N" (all encased within an outlined circle), was used from 1955 up to 1970. The original ITN theme tune was an excerpt of Non-Stop, a piece of light music composed by John Malcolm, used from 1955 up to 1982. As the years went on, full-length ITN news programmes were launched with their own theme music and particular branding (first News at Ten, then First Report, and finally News at 5.45), meaning that by its end, Non-Stop was only in use on generic news bulletins mainly at weekends.

=== 1969–1972: Launch of News at 10 ===
In 1967, ITN editor Geoffrey Cox suggested launching a half-hour news bulletin for ITV, every weeknight. ITV executives, however, were sceptical of that idea, because it was thought that viewers would not want a full 30 minutes of news every Monday to Friday (there had only been one half-hour news programme in Britain previously – BBC2's Newsroom, launched in 1964). However, the idea was approved on the condition it ran for a 13-week trial, and News at Ten was born on 3 July 1967. ITN's head newscasters – Alastair Burnet, Andrew Gardner, and George Ffitch – presented the first News at Ten, and the bulletin became so popular with viewers that it was kept in the schedules after its initial 13 weeks. The programme's titles used an excerpt of The Awakening, a piece of dramatic music composed by Johnny Pearson. The famous chimes of the Westminster Clock Tower – affectionately known as the bongs – separated each headline as it was read out. The early opening title sequences were simplistic; for the first two years, the ITN symbol faded into a wide studio shot showing the two newscasters at the desk, with the caption News at 10. Then, in 1969, a new title sequence was introduced: a slow pan of the Houses of Parliament was followed by a sharp zoom into the face of "Big Ben" showing the time of 22:00. The text "Independent Television News" was shown at the start of the sequence, followed by the individual words "NEWS", "at" and "TEN", which appeared in time to the title music. The sequence was amended a year later to feature the new ITN logo at the beginning. The logo, introduced in 1970, was a simple sans-serif outline of the phrase "ITN". The basic concept of the logo remains today.

=== 1972–1999: Expansion of news output ===
A still from an early News at Ten opening sequence from c. 1969.

On 16 October 1972, a twenty-minute lunchtime bulletin was introduced into the ITV schedule – First Report, which was hosted by Robert Kee and ran from 12:40 to 13:00. This was followed on 6 September 1976 by the introduction of a new evening bulletin, the News at 545, which ran from 17:45 to 18:00; Michael Nicholson and Leonard Parkin alternated in the newscaster chair. By this time, with three regular ITN bulletins throughout the day – and each having their own look and specially composed music – the original ITN Non-Stop theme music was only seen on generic summaries and weekend bulletins. In 1982, it was finally replaced with a synthesised alternative.

First Report was moved to 13:00 on 30 September 1974 and retitled News at One in 1976; Leonard Parkin and Peter Sissons alternated in the presenter's chair. Michael Nicholson continued as main newscaster of the News at 545, with Martyn Lewis replacing Parkin as the relief presenter. In 1986, Nicholson left newscasting to return to war reporting and was replaced by Alastair Stewart. Leonard Parkin retired in 1987, and Peter Sissons became a main newscaster for ITN's Channel 4 News (before moving to the BBC in 1989) – it was at this point that the programme revamped. It was moved to 12:30, and appropriately became the News at 12:30. Julia Somerville joined ITN from the BBC's Nine O'Clock News to host the new programme, with John Suchet and Jon Snow acting as relief presenters. In 1988, the programme returned to its original slot and once again became the News at One; the presenting line-up remained unchanged. In 1989, Somerville left the programme to become a main presenter of News at Ten, leaving Suchet to become the main lunchtime newscaster – the programme was revamped once more. In 1991, the programme moved back to the 12:30 slot, but retained the studio setting. In 1993, graphics were relaunched to bring it in line with other ITN news bulletins.

News at 545 was replaced by the News at 540 in 1989 (following the introduction of the ITV National Weather forecast), and a new presenting team was formed comprising Carol Barnes, Nicholas Owen, Trevor McDonald, Fiona Armstrong, and Alastair Stewart. The programme lasted until March 1992 when it was renamed and relaunched, in line with other ITN bulletins.

News at Ten continued to rate as the most popular news programme on television. In 1988, the programme launched specially made opening titles featuring a computer generated travel through London, up the River Thames until the camera stops at the "Big Ben" clockface.

ITN's regular newscasting team in the 1980s included Alastair Burnet, Sandy Gall, Leonard Parkin, Alastair Stewart, Trevor McDonald, Julia Somerville, Carol Barnes, Fiona Armstrong, John Suchet, Nicholas Owen, and a host of well-known reporters and correspondents.

=== 1990–2001: ITN reforms ===
In 1991, ITN moved into its new building at Gray's Inn Road, London (previously owned by The Sunday Times). From this year, ITN news programmes revamped and moved to be presented from the ITV newsroom, foremostly to show the impressive atrium in the newly purchased headquarters – with the exception of the lunchtime programme which continued with its own studio and music, but took on elements of the new revamp – such as the serif font style newly introduced for ITN bulletins. The News at 12:30 bulletin itself was renamed the Lunchtime News in 1992. The main lunchtime newscasters between 1992 and 1995 were Nicholas Owen and Carol Barnes. Dermot Murnaghan, Sonia Ruseler (who left in 1993) and Julia Somerville acted as relief newscasters until 1995, when Murnaghan and Somerville became the bulletin's regular newscasters.

News at 540 was renamed the Early Evening News on 2 March 1992 and presented from the ITV newsroom adjacent to the ITN atrium. John Suchet was the main newscaster for the Early Evening News, and relief presenters included Carol Barnes, Nicholas Owen and Dermot Murnaghan.

News at Ten underwent a revamp on 9 November 1992 after the departures of newscasters Alastair Burnet (in August 1991) and Sandy Gall (in early 1992, though he did remain at ITN filing special war reports for News at Ten). A new set was created for the programme, featuring television monitors, a large video screen, and a curved desk with "News at Ten" inscribed into it. Trevor McDonald became the sole newscaster of the programme. John Suchet, Dermot Murnaghan, and Julia Somerville were relief presenters for the bulletin. Initially, the new-look News at Ten was presented from the same studio as the Early Evening News, adjacent to the ITV newsroom.

In 1995, all ITN programmes relaunched with a unified look, using blue colours (the corporate colour of ITN at the time). A new set was created in the former Early Evening News studio, adjacent to the atrium and next to the ITV newsroom. The glass walls were coated in semi-transparent blue perspex; the left wall looked onto the lobby of ITN's building, whilst the right showed the busy atmosphere of the ITV newsroom. Different variations on the theme music distinguished the main bulletins. Design firm Lambie-Nairn devised the new look, which saw special arrangements of the famous News at Ten music being used for the other bulletins (as composed by Dave Hewson).

=== 2001–2002: Second incarnation of News at 10 ===
Whereas the 2001 ITV News at Ten was at 22:00 for only three nights a week, the BBC's Ten O'Clock News was a firm fixture at ten for six nights a week. ITV rarely started this incarnation of News at Ten on time; time starts ranging from 21:55 to 22:10 led to the programme being disparaged as "News at When?" and viewers soon switched to the BBC. In January 2002, the ITN name was removed from the voiceovers at the start of bulletins and reporter name-checks. The ITN name and logo is now only seen on the production slide, and is only used in ITV bulletins when referring to footage shot by ITN camera teams working for other clients (for example: the ITN name is used when both News at Ten and Channel 4 News broadcast the same piece of footage).

=== 2003–2006 ===
On 19 March 2003, with the outbreak of warfare in Iraq, ITV replaced the ITV News at Ten with a special 45-minute-long ITV News at Nine every Monday to Friday, hosted by Trevor McDonald in Kuwait City and John Suchet in the ITV News studio in London. The News at Nine proved to be very popular, reaching 9.1 million viewers on the first night in comparison to the 5 to 6 million for the BBC's late evening news. The ITV Evening News was extended to 60 minutes, and various ITV news specials ran throughout the schedules. A simulcast of the ITV News Channel aired from 00:00 to 05:30 every night on ITV1. ITN also managed to persuade big name newscasters to return to the organisation to present the special war coverage on ITV: Alastair Stewart, Carol Barnes, Angela Rippon, Jon Nicholson and Anne Leuchars were all back presenting news bulletins and regular slots on the ITV News Channel.

Since 2004, ITV plc's 40% stake in ITN has been held as part of (and the company's ITV News operations integrated into) the ITV News Group. The ITV News Group also comprises the ITV regions in England, Wales, Northern Ireland and the Channel Islands, as well as ITV Sport. Its director is Michael Jermey, formerly a programme editor with ITN.

On 2 February 2004, ITV News unveiled a £1 million virtual studio, with a rounded green screen (the set was nicknamed the "Theatre of News") for presenters to stand up in front of and present graphics to viewers. As part of the revamp, the ITV News at Ten was axed due to low ratings and replaced with the News at Ten Thirty, hosted once again by McDonald (from Monday-Thursday), and by Mark Austin on Fridays. The new programme did not fare any better in the ratings; News at Ten had once gained audiences of 10 million or more, though the News at Ten Thirty now struggled to reach 2 million viewers on any one night (though the flagship ITV Evening News regularly attracted audiences of around 6 million). In addition, ITV abandoned its 24-hour news channel towards the end of 2005, saying it was not "commercially viable". The ITV News Channel was replaced by men's channel ITV4 and the recently launched CITV channel in March 2006.

=== 2006–2009 ===
On 16 January 2006, to reflect the launch of the new ITV logo, ITV News revamped with a teal-coloured look. The music 'World Agenda' was remixed to become slightly 'heavier', called 'Global Headlines', and new opening titles were made based around the famous Big Ben clock face. A specially made VR view of the ITN atrium now adorned the "Theatre of News" screen (an earlier version had been used for ITV's Election 2005 a year previously). On 13 November 2006, as part of ITV1's major overhaul, the teal-colours of the name-strap designs and other on-screen graphics – including the atrium design – were replaced with blue. The teal-coloured opening titles and stings remained unchanged.

In April 2007 ITN announced that ITV had awarded it a 6-year contract to produce ITV News, at a cost of £250 million. However, ITN announced that the new budget meant it would have to cut staff despite already operating on a smaller budget than its two main rivals BBC News and Sky News.

On 2 December 2007, ITV News and the ITV regional newsrooms switched from the traditional 4:3 format to 16:9 widescreen.

In 2007, ITV plc's newly appointed chairman Michael Grade was reported as saying that the axing of the original News at Ten was "the worst mistake ITV ever made"; not long afterwards, plans were made for the famous bulletin to return to ITV. News at Ten returned on 14 January 2008, with a revised version of the original theme tune (which was called 'World Report'), presented by Trevor McDonald (temporarily, until November of that year, after which point Mark Austin took over) and former Sky News presenter Julie Etchingham. The studio contained a VR view over night-time London (with an outline of the Big Ben clockface superimposed on top), with dark blue and black being the primary colour scheme; VR glass 'sheets' also provided News at Ten logos on them.

An example of the standing-up presentation discontinued from 2009 – Geraint Vincent presenting an edition of the ITV Evening News in late 2008

In 2007, The Guardian reported that ITV planned to take its news output "back to basics" by paring back graphics and having newscasters adopt a more formal style of presenting from behind the desk instead of standing up. This was confirmed when, on 9 February 2009, ITN refreshed ITV News to bring it more in line with the News at Ten studio set. All news bulletins began to be presented from behind a desk; a VR view over London appeared as the backdrop (different coloured versions were used depending on the time of day). Continuing the cohesive look across all programmes, VR glass screens also appeared in the studio to provide graphics and live links with correspondents and reporters. Almost all of the teal-coloured graphics of 2006 were replaced with reworked blue versions to provide some consistency with the rest of the ITV News look, but the teal clockface opening animation remained on the ITV News-branded bulletins. Jib camera pans across the studio replaced the previous title sequence; these shots were pre-recorded 10 to 15 minutes before transmission, because it is a difficult shot to achieve and cannot be done if other studio cameras are already in place.

In July 2009, to coincide with the 40th anniversary of the NASA Moon landings, ITN produced five special 10-minute programmes for ITV titled Mission to the Moon – News from 1969. The programmes took the form of news bulletins, reporting on the day's events of 1969. John Suchet, a former ITN newscaster, was the presenter of these specials; he was aided by a team of correspondents including Andrea Catherwood (who had left ITV News in 2006) and Peter Snow, who was an ITN newscaster and correspondent between 1962 and 1979. The first Mission to the Moon programme aired at 22:35 on ITV on Wednesday 15 July and continued the following Thursday, Friday, Sunday and Monday (Friday in Scotland, on STV).

In August 2009, it was announced that after 16 years co-hosting London Tonight, Alastair Stewart was to leave the regional magazine programme to become the main co-anchor of the ITV Evening News. Mark Austin continued to present some editions of the 18:30 bulletin. It was also revealed that, following his successful stint as presenter of Election Night Live: America Decides in 2008, Stewart was to present the ITN/ITV coverage of the UK general election in 2010.

=== 2009–2012 ===
The semi-circular "Theatre of News" studio set, in use for five years, was last broadcast on Sunday 1 November 2009.

ITV News logo from 2010 to 2013

On 22 October 2009, it was jointly announced by ITN and ITV that ITV News would be rebranded from Monday 2 November. At the heart of the revamp was the removal of the famous image of the Big Ben clock tower from the opening sequence of ITV News programmes including News at Ten; ITV executives felt, after "months of deliberation", that the imagery of the landmark promoted London-centricity to viewers outside the capital. A clockface remained as part of the studio backdrop and also appeared within the opening titles, and the headline bongs were also retained. The November revamp included a newly designed rectangular set and graphics featuring a colour scheme of black and gold to complement the ITV1 image and branding. A newly composed piece music called 'News Centre' was introduced, which incorporated only a few elements of 'The Awakening', the previous ITV News theme. The ITV News revamp was developed by ITN, ITV and design agency Bruce Dunlop Associates. ITV-plc regional news programmes continued to use their studio sets introduced in 2004, but with an updated colourscheme and news titles reflecting the ITV News rebrand.

In December 2009, ITV News at Ten won the award for Best National Television Programme from the Plain English Awards.

In April 2010, it was announced that after 12 years working at ITN, Katie Derham was to leave the organisation to front the BBC's coverage of the Proms for BBC Two and BBC Radio 3. A spokesman for BBC Radio 3 confirmed the appointment but declined to give any further details.

=== 2012–present ===
On 16 November 2012 it was announced ITV News would rebrand in January 2013. On 27 November 2012 it was understood the ITV News at 5:30 would be axed, in favour of delivering content for itv.com and creating a new foreign affairs unit. The new look brought forth another rearrangement of signature tune The Awakening, called 'Global Broadcast', more direct than its predecessors, and a new opening sequence featuring "Big Ben" marking the time for its respective news programmes; it also saw the ITN logo removed entirely, the production slide instead being the ITV News logo with "ITN year" in small type underneath.

In January 2022, ITV announced that their Evening News programme would be extended to become an hour-long programme at 6:30pm from March.

In July 2022, it was reported that, with the launch of the new streaming service "ITVX", the platform will feature an ITV News 24/7 service. The service will provide ITV News around the clock as well as providing an on-demand service for in-depth investigations, explanatory and eye-witness journalism. The service will not be a conventional rolling news channel, however it will have 'occasional' live programmes and bulletins. Instead, the service will focus on "video on-demand" content which they promise will be continuously updated. ITVX launched on 8 December 2022.

As part of cost cutting measures at ITV Studios Daytime, from 5 January 2026 Good Morning Britain was produced under the ITV News banner with production moving from Television Centre to ITN's Central London headquarters. The rest of ITV Studios Daytime was merged with Multistory Media and took over production of Lorraine, This Morning and Loose Women with production moved to The H Club Studio in Covent Garden. As a result of the cost cutting measures 220 jobs were lost at ITV. Following this, ITV News reintroduced the standard studio set (for the first time since 2004) that shares the Good Morning Britain studio set, with the remaining of the opening titles, music, graphics and a projected fictional studio control room backdrop from before.

== "Big Ben" branding ==
The clockface appearing in the News at Ten titles from January 2008 to November 2009. Other bulletins used a stylised image

Trademarks of ITN and ITV News are the inclusion of the Elizabeth Tower at the Houses of Parliament in its programme titles, along with the chimes of Big Ben (known popularly as the "bongs") between headlines. The "bongs" were originally introduced for News at Ten in 1967; the other ITN bulletins used different studio designs, individual graphic sets and individual music. In 1992, News at Ten was relaunched following the decision to move to a single newscaster – Trevor McDonald won the role – and composer Dave Hewson was assigned with the responsibility of musical changes. The famous theme tune was re-arranged by Hewson and re-recorded in a slightly higher pitch but the timpani and chimes remained. Starting in July 1995, ITN adopted a unified look for all ITV bulletins except News at Ten, extending the use of the Big Ben clockface and branding to all bulletins on the channel; Hewson again composed the music.

In March 1999, the "ITV News" brand was introduced and, with the loss of News at Ten, the "bongs" were extended to all ITN bulletins (despite all but one of them starting on the half-hour) except the ITV Morning News until June 2000. The ITN name was dropped from the start of bulletins and, in January 2002, from reporter sign-offs. "The Awakening" was re-arranged again in February 2004 as part of a major revamp of ITV News, and again in January 2006 with a further revamp of ITV News bulletins. Despite the 2008 return of News at Ten, the other bulletins continued to use the "bongs".

In February 2009, ITV News bulletins were refreshed to be more cohesive with the branding and look of News at Ten, with the studio featuring a VR view of London and an outline of the Big Ben clockface filling the "theatre of news" screen.

On 22 October 2009, it was announced that the "Big Ben" branding would be removed from ITV News from 2 November to avoid perceptions of London-centricity, thus marking the first time that the clock tower has not been used in programme titles for ITN bulletins on ITV since before 1967. However, "Big Ben" hadn't gone entirely – a clockface was retained as part of ITV News' studio design and appeared as a image in the opening titles from 2009 to 2013; and the clock tower was seen again in the ITV News opening sequences from 2013.

== Election coverage ==
ITN has, like the BBC, run special through-the-night coverage on the day of general elections in Britain and on the day of presidential elections in the United States since its formation in 1955. Election 64 – The Result was hosted by Alastair Burnet, the fast-rising face of politics on ITV, and contained many visual gimmicks to keep the audience interested in the coverage. The BBC started the trend with its "swingometer" device. ITN's 1964 coverage presented a contraption referred to by Burnet as "KDF9" which aimed to pull in the results faster than its competitor over at the BBC. ITN's Election 66, again hosted by Burnet and providing nine-hour coverage of the results of the election between Harold Wilson and Ted Heath, used two computer machines that Burnet described as bringing in numerous pieces of data and statistical information – Burnet also quipped, "I'll let you into a secret – it can sing as well". The 1974 general election results were presented under the title The Nation Decides by Peter Snow. Technology had also vastly improved. "VTF30", a piece of technology based upon a knitting-pattern machine, provided moving computer graphics for the first time in television election coverage history.

The team of Alastair Burnet and Peter Sissons provided many memorable election night programmes on ITV, including the 1984 European elections and Election 87, but by 1992 the faces of ITV's political coverage had changed somewhat. Election 92 was anchored by Jon Snow, with Alastair Stewart providing graphical commentary and Julia Somerville assisting with regular news summaries. Stewart and Somerville were again present for ITV's 1997 coverage of the John Major-Tony Blair election – aptly titled Election 97 – with Jonathan Dimbleby as the anchor. Dimbleby returned for Election 2001 and Election 2005, aided both times by ITV News' political editors John Sergeant (in 2001) and Nick Robinson (in 2005) and a team of correspondents and newscasters around the country at polling stations.

The US presidential election of November 2008 was covered by ITN on the ITV network between 23:15 and 06:00 in a programme titled Election Night Live: America Decides, which saw ITN team up with fellow news organisation NBC News; Alastair Stewart hosted from the studio in London, supported by MORI-founder Bob Worcester and a team of studio guests throughout the evening. Julie Etchingham, James Mates, Bill Neely and John Irvine provided the all-important presenting and reporting duties from the United States. Stewart also presented ITN coverage of the European elections of 2009, an intimate affair with the newscaster and ITV News election analyst Colin Rallings in the studio. Political Editor Tom Bradby and Senior Political Correspondent Chris Ship provided regular updates, and a team of reporters gave results as they were counted around the country.

The UK general election campaign of 2010 was covered by ITV under the banner Campaign 2010, prominent in all its news and current affairs programming. There were special election-themed editions of the Tonight programme presented by ITN reporters and newscasters. Alastair Stewart was the moderator for The First Election Debate, the first ever debate between leaders of political parties in the United Kingdom, transmitted on 15 April between 20:30 and 22:00. A weekly discussion programme also began on that date: Campaign 2010 with Jonathan Dimbleby. The weeks of special programming culminated in the 6 May election night coverage on ITV: Election 2010, which was broadcast between 21:55 and 06:00 and presented by Alastair Stewart. Julie Etchingham fronted the traditional ITV election night graphics, Mary Nightingale hosted the ITV election party on the bank of the Thames, and ITV News Election Analyst Colin Rallings provided the all-important psephological information. GMTV dedicated its entire 7 May programme to the Election, with contributions from ITV newscasters Etchingham, Nightingale and James Mates. Mark Austin and Katie Derham continued the ITN coverage following GMTV: Election 2010 returned between 09:25 and 10:50. Alastair Stewart then returned with the programme at 12:30 until 15:00. ITV Wales, STV and UTV provided additional programming relevant to their coverage areas.

The 2012 American presidential election was held on Tuesday 6 November 2012. Alistair Stewart hosted overnight coverage of the results from 23:35 to 06:00. Teams of correspondents in the UK and the US were providing updates throughout the night.

The 2015 UK general election was held on Thursday 7 May 2015. Tom Bradby and Julie Etchingham anchored ITV's coverage of the results from the main ITV News studio at ITN from 21:55 on Thursday 7 May and continued through the night until 06:00 on Friday 8 May 2015. They were joined in the studio by election analysts Professor Colin Rallings and Professor Jane Green. Nina Hossain presented live from the "Opinion Room" at ITN where journalists, bloggers, politicians and experts gave their view on the results of the election. From the "Opinion Room", viewers could contact the programme via Facebook and Twitter to give their views and opinions. UTV in Northern Ireland and STV in Scotland provided their own overnight coverage of the election results in their region from their main studios in Belfast and Glasgow, dipping in and out of the ITV news coverage during the night. The rest of the UK had regular regional news opt outs from their own local ITV News programmes during the overnight coverage on ITV.

At 06:00 on Friday 8 May 2015, ITV's breakfast programme Good Morning Britain aired their first election coverage special on ITV, Good Morning Britain having only launched in the spring of 2014. Hosts Susanna Reid and Ben Shephard were joined by Tom Bradby for breakfast coverage of the results. At 09:25 ITV News resumed with their own coverage of the results with Alastair Stewart and Julie Etchingham at their anchor desks until late afternoon on ITV. During the course of the day there were regular regional news opt outs, with UTV and STV providing more extensive coverage of the election results in their own region.

The 2016 presidential election in the US was on Tuesday 8 November 2016. Tom Bradby presented News at Ten from Washington, D.C. from 22:00 to 22:30, Rageah Omar was in London hosting it as well. After the local news, Tom Bradby presented overnight coverage from 22:40 to 06:00. Piers Morgan and Suzanna Reid presented Good Morning Britain from Washington, D.C. from 06:00 to 09:25.

The then Prime Minister Theresa May called a snap general election for Thursday 8 June 2017. ITV News once again had Tom Bradby at the helm from 9:55 pm on ITV, using the same set design from the 2015 general election. He was joined by Professors Jane Green and Colin Rallings, along with Robert Peston and Nina Hossain. Bradby was joined through the night by former chancellor George Osborne and former shadow chancellor Ed Balls. Coverage handed over to Good Morning Britain with Piers Morgan and Susanna Reid from 6:00 am, with the ITV News coverage resuming at 9:25 am, and airing through the rest of the day on ITV with Julie Etchingham anchoring the coverage through Friday.

The 2019 general election happened on Thursday 12 December 2019. ITV News once again had Tom Bradby as the main anchor in the studio, using once again a similar set design used in 2015 and 2017, however some updates to the background were made. ITV News also used the large space of the atrium at ITN headquarters in London, using it as the election results headquarters, with Robert Peston-based there. Coverage started at 9:55 pm and aired through the night, handing over once again to Good Morning Britain at 6am, and resuming coverage from 9:25am with Julie Etchingham anchoring the coverage through Friday. The ITV schedule had the overnight coverage listed as two shows: 21:55 to 02:00 and 02:00 to 06:00.

The 2020 US presidential election was held on Tuesday 3 November 2020. Tom Bradby presented overnight coverage from Washington, D.C. from 23:00 to 06:00. Good Morning Britain had the latest on the results with Piers Morgan and Susanna Reid from 06:00 to 09:00 but unlike 2016 it was from London not Washington, D.C.. This was due to the COVID-19 pandemic. The ITV schedule had the overnight coverage listed as three shows: 23:00 to 00:00, 00:00 to 03:00 and 03:00 to 06:00.

The 2024 general election was held on Thursday 4 July 2024. Tom Bradby hosted overnight coverage from 21:50 to 06:00 handing over to Good Morning Britain at 06:00 and then Julie Etchingham from 09:25 to 15:30 on the Friday. The ITV schedule had the daytime coverage listed as two shows: 09:25 to 14:00 and 14:00 to 15:30.

The 2024 presidential election was held on Tuesday 5 November 2024. From Monday 4 to Thursday 7 November 2024. Tom Bradby hosted News at Ten from Washington, D.C.. After the local news Tuesday 5 November. Tom Bradby presented overnight coverage from 22:45 to 06:00 and it was live from Washington D.C.. Good Morning Britain started at 06:00 live from Washington, D.C. and GMB was also in Washington on Thursday 7 November. The ITV schedule had the overnight coverage listed as two shows: 22:45 to 00:00 and 00:00 to 06:00. ITV News was also live from Washington, D.C. with the bulletin at 22:00 on Sunday 3 November.

== Broadcasts ==
National and international news

- Good Morning Britain (from January 2026)
- ITV Lunchtime News
- ITV Evening News
- ITV News at Ten
- ITV Weekend News

Nations and regions news
The 2013 rebrand of ITV News saw the brand being extended to regional news programmes operated by ITV plc replacing the previous regional news titles. Regional ITV news programmes are produced by ITV plc, with the exception of the ITV London region which is produced by ITN. Since the creation of ITV plc in 2004 all regional news programmes in these regions have taken on a unified look and appearance on screen while structurally the merger has enabled ITV to create the ITV News Group consisting of ITN's national news service and the regional services provided by ITV plc and STV Group.

- Calendar (ITV Yorkshire)
- Granada Reports (ITV Granada)
- ITV News Anglia (ITV Anglia)
- ITV News Central (ITV Central)
- ITV News Channel TV (ITV Channel)
- ITV News London (ITN for ITV London)
- ITV News Meridian (ITV Meridian)
- ITV News Tyne Tees/Lookaround (ITV Tyne Tees & Border)
- ITV News West Country (ITV West Country)
- STV News at Six (STV)
- UTV Live (UTV)
- Wales at Six (ITV Cymru Wales)

== On air staff ==
The current on-screen journalists at ITV News are divided into international correspondents, home affairs correspondents, political correspondents (headed by political editor Robert Peston), specialist correspondents (covering sport, media and arts, science and medicine, consumer affairs, social affairs, economic, and diplomatic affairs. Emma Murphy is International Affairs Editor, James Mates acts as Europe Editor, and there is a team of news correspondents.

== Awards ==
ITN has won many key industry awards for its news coverage on ITV during the past fifty years. Legendary editor Geoffrey Cox was the recipient of ITN's very first award – a BAFTA in 1962. Since then BAFTA has gone on to present ITN with a total of 26 awards, for coverage on ITV ranging from Francis Chichester's home-coming in 1967 to the Northern Ireland troubles, the Iranian Embassy siege, wars in the Falklands, Lebanon and the Gulf, the Zeebrugge ferry disaster, the discovery of the Serb camps, the genocide in Rwanda, the storming of the Moscow White House, and the conflict in former Yugoslavia.

ITN/ITV News picked up both Royal Television Society (RTS) and Broadcast awards for coverage of the Beslan school siege, and Alastair Stewart won the RTS News Presenter of the Year award in 2005. The 18:30 ITV Evening News held the title of RTS News Programme of the Year for four years running, starting in 2004. News at Ten was nominated for the award in the RTS Journalism Awards 2007/2008, but lost out to the BBC News at 10. However, in the BAFTA Television Awards ceremony held on Sunday 26 April 2009, News at Ten won in the category News Coverage for their coverage of the 2008 Sichuan earthquake. It was up against its ITN rival Channel 4 News and Sky News, who had two nominations. News at Ten's coverage of the earthquake also won the International Emmy award for News Coverage in September 2009. In June 2010, the programme won the News Coverage BAFTA for the second year running, for their coverage of the 2010 Haiti earthquake.

There have been over 70 RTS awards for both domestic and international coverage, with the first coming for the 1969 Apollo 11 Moon landing. Home based issues including the miners' strike, the Iranian embassy siege, the Tottenham riots, the Kings Cross fire, the death of Labour leader John Smith and coverage of Dunblane have all been voted the Best Journalism of the Year by the RTS.

From the United States there has been recognition of ITN's journalism, from the prestigious Emmy awards, the New York Television Programming Festival and the White House News Photographers' Association. ITN was the first non-US news broadcaster to win a News and Documentary Emmy when it was awarded top prize for Outstanding Investigative Journalism for the 1992 discovery of the Serb camps. The famous footage of emaciated men behind barbed wire went round the world and helped change the course of the conflict in Bosnia.

In addition to many BAFTA, Emmy and RTS awards, ITN/ITV News has also claimed awards from the Monte Carlo Gold Nymphs, prizes from the News Festival of Angers in France, the Television and Radio Industries Club, the Ethnic Multicultural Media Awards and the Broadcasting Press Guild as well as many others.

== See also ==
- List of ITV journalists and newsreaders
