= Murray Dron =

Murray Arnold Dron (born 23 January 1975) is a British journalist and television presenter working for ITN on London Tonight and ITV News.

== Background ==
Dron was born in Perth, Scotland, but grew up in Jersey from a young age. He was educated at Elizabeth College, Guernsey and graduated from Edge Hill University with a degree in Media.

== Broadcasting career ==
Murray began his career in the Channel Islands as presenter of Channel Television's nightly regional news programme Channel Report alongside Kristina Moore. He also presented the weekly sports show Report Sport.

From 2007 Dron was a freelance sports reporter for ITV News, covering a wide range of events, including Formula One, Premier League football, the cricket and rugby World Cups and the Tour de France.

He was a launch presenter on Setanta Sports News, co-hosting Lunchtime Live alongside Charlotte Jackson until the channel ceased broadcasting in June 2009.

In August 2009 Murray started reporting for London Tonight and ITV News.

== Personal life ==
Dron plays volleyball for Jersey and has competed at the Island Games three times.
