= Samantha Harvey (singer) =

British pop singer

- Born: 30 May 1993 (age 33); Harleston, Suffolk, England
- Origin: Suffolk
- Education: Stowmarket High School, Suffolk New College
- Genres: Pop; R&B; dance; soul
- Occupations: Singer, songwriter, youtuber
- Years active: 2014–present
- Labels: Virgin EMI; Capitol
- Website: samanthaharveyofficial.co.uk

Samantha Harvey (born 30 May 1993) is an English singer, songwriter, and YouTuber currently signed to Virgin EMI Records in the UK and Capitol Records in the US. She initially gained a following by posting covers of popular songs on her YouTube channel. Her independently released 2017 single, "Forgive Forget", peaked at number 48 on the UK Singles Chart. She released her first major label single, "Please", in February 2018. She followed that with her major label debut EP, also titled Please, in March 2018.

== Early life and education ==
Harvey was born in Harleston. She attended Chilton Community Primary School and Stowmarket High School. At age 16, she joined Oskar Foxtrot Productions where she acted and sang in plays. She also studied performing arts at Suffolk New College. While studying, she set up a house-cleaning business in the Suffolk area. In 2014, she began recording and posting covers onto her YouTube channel. Her first cover was of Sam Smith's "Lay Me Down". Samantha then sang this song for her one million subscriber celebration.

== Career ==
While still working as a house cleaner, Harvey began building a following on her YouTube channel by posting covers of songs by artists like, Adele, Celine Dion, Ed Sheeran, Little Mix, Selena Gomez, Birdy, and numerous others. By April 2016, she was nearing 1 million likes on her Facebook account. She released her first original single, "Wonderland", in September 2016. In November 2016, she appeared on Good Morning Britain singing the weather report.

By April 2017, her YouTube channel had 400,000 subscribers and that number increased to 600,000 by June. In July, her independently released single, "Forgive Forget", reached number 4 on the iTunes chart and number 48 on the UK Singles Chart. Around that time, she quit her cleaning business to focus exclusively on music. In October 2017, she was signed to Virgin EMI Records and Capitol Records.

Harvey released her debut major label single, "Please", in February 2018, and it peaked at number 67 on the UK Singles Chart. She continued releasing covers, including one of Shania Twain's "From This Moment On" and Dua Lipa's "IDGAF" in February 2018. In March 2018, Harvey released her debut EP, Please, through Virgin EMI. Later that year, German singer and songwriter, Nico Santos, collaborated with Harvey on a revised version of his single, "Rooftop". In July 2018, she was featured on the Alex Adair and Delayers track, "Dominos". She also appeared in the song's accompanying music video.

Later in 2018, Harvey headlined throughout the UK and Ireland for the "Between Us Tour", performing both original songs from the EP and covers. In November 2019, she released a single entitled "Get to Know You". On 1 July 2022, she released "Heartbreak Hangover".

== Discography ==
=== EPs ===
List of EPs with selected details
Title	Details
Please	Released: 9 March 2018 (UK); Label: Virgin EMI; Formats: Digital download

=== Singles ===
List of singles, with selected chart positions, showing year released and album name
Title	Year	Peak chart positions	Album
Title	Year	UK	Album
"Forgive Forget"	2017	48	Non-album single
"Please"	2018	67	Please
"Get to Know You"	2019	—	Non-album single
"Hard to Get"	2020	—	Non-album single
"Unbreakable"	2020	—	Non-album single
"Don't Call It Love"	2021	—	Non-album single
"Company" (with Sondr)	2021	—	Non-album single
"Heartbreak Hangover"	2022	—	Non-album single
"Think About"	2024	—	Non-album single
"—" denotes a single that did not chart or was not released in that territory.
