= Caldbeck transmitting station =

Broadcasting and telecommunications facility in Cumbria, England

Caldbeck
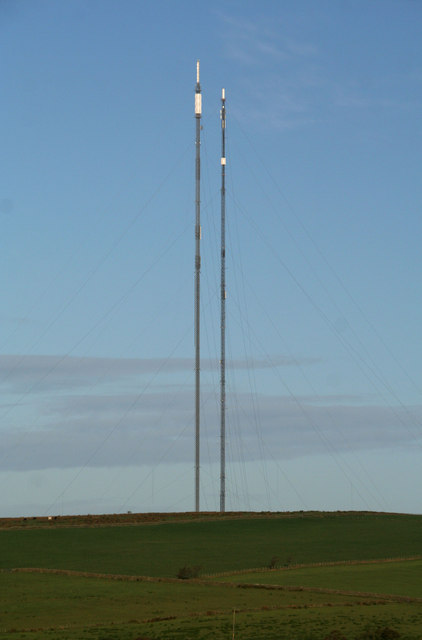

- Location within Cumbria
- Mast height: 337 metres (1,106 ft)
- Coordinates: 54.773333°N 3.090556°W
- Grid reference: NY299425
- Built: 1961 (original); 2008 (current)
- Demolished: 2008 (original)
- BBC region: BBC North East and Cumbria; BBC Scotland
- ITV region: ITV Border
- Local TV service: That's Cumbria

The Caldbeck transmitting station is a broadcasting and telecommunications facility, situated close to the village of Caldbeck, in Cumbria, England (Grid Reference: NY299425). It is owned and operated by Arqiva.

It includes a 337-metre-high (1,106 ft) guyed steel lattice mast, which is the third highest structure in the United Kingdom. The transmission antennas surmounting the structure are contained within a fibreglass cylinder.

== History ==
The station was originally commissioned by the Independent Television Authority to bring ITV signals (provided by Border Television) to South West Scotland and Northern parts of Cumberland and Westmorland, including Carlisle and Dumfries using 405-line on VHF Channel 11 (Band III).

Border Television were given the contract in May 1960. Construction on the ITV studio began in late September 1960.

Construction had started by November 1960, and almost finished by June 1961, it originally included a 306.6 metres (1,006 ft) tall guyed steel lattice mast that came into service on 1 September of that year. The BBC's VHF television and radio services were carried by the nearby Sandale transmitting station.

The other Border Television transmitter was the Selkirk transmitting station which opened in November 1961.

When UHF television started in the UK in 1969, Caldbeck was selected to carry all the 625-line services for the area. The original three channel line-up came into service in September 1971. Channel 4 began from Caldbeck from its launch in November 1982. 405 line television was discontinued in the UK in 1985.

In 1993, CFM Radio launched from Caldbeck on 96.4 MHz FM, and later in 2001 the national digital multiplex Digital One entered service.

=== 1977 aircraft incident ===
On the morning of Friday August 19 1977, a USAF F-4 Phantom flew through the supporting cables, and severed the aircraft's starboard wing, taking two feet off. Major John McKenney was at 600ft. The aircraft had taken off from RAF Bentwaters. The aircraft survived.

On August 14 1968 a North American F-100 Super Sabre from Suffolk hit Zendstation Smilde in the Netherlands, at a height of 250 metres, also taking off part of the wing.

Also on 27 March 1973, Hunter 'XG256', of 79 Squadron, hit the supports of Caradon Hill transmitting station and crashed. The pilot, 23 year old Flying Officer Richard Pearson, safely ejected.

== Digital switchover ==
Caldbeck was one of the first transmitters in the UK to be upgraded to high power digital only TV broadcasting. The Digital Switchover took place between June & July 2009. At this time, the analogue signal was permanently switched off. Extra multiplexes for BBC Scotland and ITV Border (Scotland) were added to the transmitter at the time.

Caldbeck underwent major engineering work to accommodate the new transmitters and aerials. The work entailed complete replacement of the existing mast with a brand new 337 m (1,106 ft) mast, work on which began on 26 April 2007. Construction of the new mast structure was completed at the beginning of March 2008. Once installation of the transmitting aerials on the new mast was complete, the old one was dismantled.

== Services listed by frequency ==
=== Analogue radio (FM VHF) ===
Frequency	kW	Service
96.4 MHz	3	Greatest Hits Radio Cumbria & South West Scotland

=== Digital radio (DAB) ===
Frequency	Block	kW	Operator
222.064 MHz	11D	2.8	Digital One

=== Digital television ===
Frequency	UHF	kW	Operator	BBC region	ITV region	System
473.833 MHz	21-	50	BBC B	Scotland	Border (Scotland)	DVB-T2
481.833 MHz	22-	100	BBC B	NE & Cumbria	Border (England)	DVB-T2
489.833 MHz	23-	50	SDN	—	—	DVB-T
497.833 MHz	24-	50	Digital 3&4	—	Border (Scotland)	DVB-T
505.833 MHz	25-	100	BBC A	NE & Cumbria	—	DVB-T
513.833 MHz	26-	50	Arqiva A	—	—	DVB-T
521.833 MHz	27-	50	BBC A	Scotland	—	DVB-T
529.833 MHz	28-	100	Digital 3&4	—	Border (England)	DVB-T
538.000 MHz	29	4	LTVmux	—	—	DVB-T
545.833 MHz	30-	50	Arqiva B	—	—	DVB-T
570.000 MHz	33	5	LTVmux	—	—	DVB-T

==== Before switchover ====
===== Digital television =====
Frequency	UHF	kW	Operator
490.000 MHz	23	15	Digital 3&4 (Mux 2)
506.000 MHz	25	10	BBC (Mux 1)
514.166 MHz	26+	15	SDN (Mux A)
618.000 MHz	39	3.2	BBC (Mux B)
642.000 MHz	42	1.6	Arqiva (Mux D)
666.000 MHz	45	1.6	Arqiva (Mux C)

===== Analogue television =====
Analogue TV ceased on the 22nd of July 2009. BBC Two were switched off on the 24th of June 2009, ITV1 moved to the old BBC2 Frequency for its last weeks of service. Mux 1 on channel 25 was switched off and was replaced by BBC A (which has just been vacatned by analogue ITV). (Kendal didn't have ITV1 moved) or Ainstable did (C4 was moved to Channel 47 (Itv's old frequency). then Caldbeck (Scotland) BBC1 Scotland moved to the old BBC2 Scotland slot.

Frequency	UHF	kW	Service	527.25 MhZ	527.25 MHz	28	500	Border
543.25 MHz	30	500	BBC1 North East					
559.25 MHz	32	500	Channel 4					
575.25 MHz	34	500	BBC2 North East					
751.25 MHz	56	10	Channel 5					

== See also ==
- List of masts
- List of tallest structures in the United Kingdom
- List of radio stations in the United Kingdom
