= Michael Jermey =

British television executive

Michael Francis Jermey (born 24 March 1964) is a British television executive, and ITV's director of news.

He attended Brasenose College, Oxford, from 1982, gaining a BA degree in PPE in 1985. He edited the student newspaper in 1984. He joined Central Television as a journalist in 1985. He joined ITN in 1986. From 1990 to 1991 he was editor of the News at Ten. From 1991 to 1993 he was head of foreign news.

In 2004 he became head of ITV's regional news operations, of which the network had eleven at the time. In 2005 he launched ITV News' trainee scheme to seek fresh journalistic talent. From 2007 to 2009 he was ITV's director of regions, stepping down before the seventeen regions were merged into nine. He has been the director of news and current affairs at ITV since 2009, and was the director of sport from 2009 to 2012. Some of Jermey's highlights included the creation of the first British general election TV debate, and his creation of the Exposure current affairs series. He also led the News at Ten refresh in 2015 to return to the single-presenter format with Tom Bradby as the main anchor.

In 2024, it was announced he would stand down at the end of that year to chair the Disasters Emergency Committee.
