= ITV Weather =

UK television weather forecast

- Type: TV weather forecasts
- Genre: UK weather
- Founded: 13 February 1989
- Founder: ITV Network
- Headquarters: Millbank, central London, England
- Area served: United Kingdom
- Key people: Manali Lukha (Head of Weather)
- Parent: ITN, Met Office
- Divisions: ITV Regional Weather
- Website: itv.com/weather

ITV Weather is the national and regional forecast shown on UK terrestrial network ITV, and is provided by the Met Office (except the Channel Islands forecast, which is provided by the Jersey Meteorological Department). Bulletins are usually broadcast after every ITV News and ITV regional bulletin; since March 2022, however, ITV Weather runs as a segment of the ITV Evening News, live from the news studio on weekdays. Emma Jesson is the longest serving forecaster after 30 years with ITV Weather.

== National weather ==
The national bulletin launched on the ITV network on 13 February 1989, airing after ITN bulletins which compliments the previous regional arrangements whereby the separate ITV regional licence holders were responsible for providing weather forecasts themselves only for their regional franchise areas.

=== National weather sponsors ===
The national weather for ITV had commercial sponsors from 1989, as listed in the chart below. ITV Weather on Good Morning Britain and its predecessor GMTV have always had a different sponsorship deal.

| Start of sponsorship | End of sponsorship | Company name |
|---|---|---|
| 13 February 1989 | 31 December 2007 | Powergen |
| 1 January 2008 | 31 December 2009 | esure/Sheilas' Wheels (ITV/STV); Gocompare.com (UTV) |
| 1 January 2010 | 1 August 2010 | Confused.com (ITV/UTV); Specsavers (STV) |
| 1 September 2010 | 31 December 2010 | Topps Tiles |
| 1 January 2011 | 31 December 2011 | The Co-operative Food |
| 1 March 2012 | 30 April 2014 | Seven Seas |
| 1 May 2014 | 2 November 2014 | Vitabiotics (ITV/UTV); Digby Brown Solicitors (STV) |
| 3 November 2014 | 1 February 2015 | Worcester Bosch Group |
| 2 February 2015 | 21 June 2015 | Crizal UV |
| 22 June 2015 | 3 July 2016 | Green Flag |
| 4 July 2016 | 8 July 2018 | SSE (ITV/UTV); Fischer Future Heat (STV) |
| 9 July 2018 | 7 October 2018 | Checkatrade |
| 8 October 2018 | 31 December 2019 | Halfords |
| 1 January 2020 | Present | Heinz/HP Sauce |
| 2021 | Present | Piri (Pollen Count) |

== Regional weather ==
Each region has at least one dedicated presenter. At weekends three presenters cover all of the 15 sub-regions and one presenter covers the national forecast. Currently the weekend hubs are grouped and recorded from the following:

- Calendar (North/South opts), Granada Reports, ITV News Tyne Tees and Lookaround.
  - MediaCityUK in Salford, Greater Manchester.
- ITV News Anglia (East/West opts), ITV News Central (East/West opts), ITV News London and ITV News Cymru Wales.
  - Millbank Studios in Millbank, central London.
- ITV News Channel TV, ITV News Meridian (East/West opts) and ITV News West Country (West/South West opts)
  - Whiteley, Hampshire or
  - Met Office in Exeter, Devon
- STV News has a dedicated weekend presenter.

== Graphics ==
On 3 October 2016, new graphics were introduced on the National ITV Weather and across all ITV plc-owned regions. These graphics are also used on Good Morning Britain in their weather updates as well as regional news. STV introduced their own new graphics earlier in 2016.
