= Independently Funded News Consortia =

News group

Independently Funded News Consortia (IFNC) were proposed as independently set-up groups providing local and regional news within various regions of the United Kingdom. The structure was proposed by Ofcom in January 2009 to respond to the reduction in provision of regional news programming by the existing Channel 3 license-holders, including ITV. The consortia were to be formed of existing interested local parties, such as local newspaper groups and agencies.

In November 2009, the Culture Secretary announced pilots for provision of regional news programming via a number of IFNCs in the nations of Scotland and Wales, as well as in the English Channel 3 regions of ITV Tyne Tees & Border. Some consortia had already expressed an interest in operating independent news provision in one of the pilot areas. Before the 2010 general election, the Department of Culture, Media and Sports had selected three consortia for Scotland, Wales and the Tyne Tees/Borders: Scottish News Consortium (consisting of Johnston Press, Herald and Times Group, D C Thomson, and Tinopolis), Wales Live (UTV and NWN Media), and News 3 (Trinity Mirror, Press Association, and Ten Alps) respectively. If the pilots had been successful, it was expected that a national roll-out in 2012-13 might be funded through use of part of the existing television licence fee.

The Conservatives opposed IFNCs, proposing instead to have city-based TV companies. In May 2010, following the establishment of a Conservative-Liberal Democrats governing coalition, plans to establish IFNCs were dropped in favour of the rollout of "super fast broadband" to rural areas. On 8 June 2010 Culture Secretary Jeremy Hunt confirmed this change of priorities. The move was criticised in Wales by the Heritage Minister and the Institute of Welsh Affairs chair.
