= Paul Brown (presenter) =

British journalist (1950*1997)

- Born: March 1950; Wales
- Died: 14 November 1997 (aged 47); Jersey
- Occupations: Journalist, news presenter
- Website: www.paulbrownmemorialfund.org

Paul Brown (1950–1997) was a senior journalist and presenter of Channel Report, Channel Television's flagship news programme. He joined Channel TV in 1972 as a reporter and during his 25-year career with the station, became one of the main presenters of Channel Report and one of the station's news editors.

He died suddenly in November 1997.
