= Manali Lukha =

British weather forecaster for ITV plc

- Born: 7 March 1975 (age 51)
- Occupation: Weather forecaster

Manali Lukha is a British weather forecaster for ITV plc. She is Head of ITV Weather.

Manali Lukha has been working for the Met Office for 10 years and was recently promoted to manage the Met Office Media Team where she provides weather services to ITV and Channel 4. In this role, Manali manages the daily production of weather bulletins for ITN and she occasionally presents the ITV London Weekend Weather. This enables her to address the unit as both the manager and a user. In 2011 and September 2013, Manali was seen as a relief forecaster for STV.

With a degree in Geology and Geography followed by a Master's degree in Geographical Information Systems, Manali joined the Met Office as part of a graduate recruitment scheme. Starting out as a software programmer, Manali developed software now used by Football Association (FA) in determining weather conditions for matches. Keen to pursue weather from a media perspective she was recruited to the Met Office Media Centre in 2000. In this role she has secured a number of key contracts for the Met Office.

On 28 September 2012 she presented her final weather forecast ahead of her maternity leave. She returned to ITV London on 14 January 2013.

As of 5 November 2013, she appears across all ITV regions as an occasional relief weather presenter. As of May 2014, she has also been seen as a relief weather presenter for the ITV National Weather.
