= ITV News Channel TV =

Regional television news programme in the Channel Islands

- Also known as: Good Morning Channel; Channel Report (until 2013)
- Genre: Regional news
- Presented by: Jess Dunsdon; Jonathan Wills
- Country of origin: Channel Islands
- Original language: English

Production
- Production locations: St Helier, Jersey; St Sampson, Guernsey
- Editor: Karen Rankine
- Camera setup: Multi-camera
- Running time: 29 minutes (18:00 broadcast)
- Production company: ITV Channel TV

Original release
- Network: ITV1 (ITV Channel TV)
- Release: 5 January 1976 – present

Related
- ITV News; ITV Weather

ITV News Channel TV (referred to as ITV News on Channel on air) is a television news service for the Channel Islands broadcast and produced by ITV Channel Television.

ITV News has its main Channel Islands newsroom in Jersey as well as a smaller bureau in Guernsey, both with reporters and camera crews working seven days a week. The station also has freelance video journalists based on the smaller islands of Alderney and Sark.

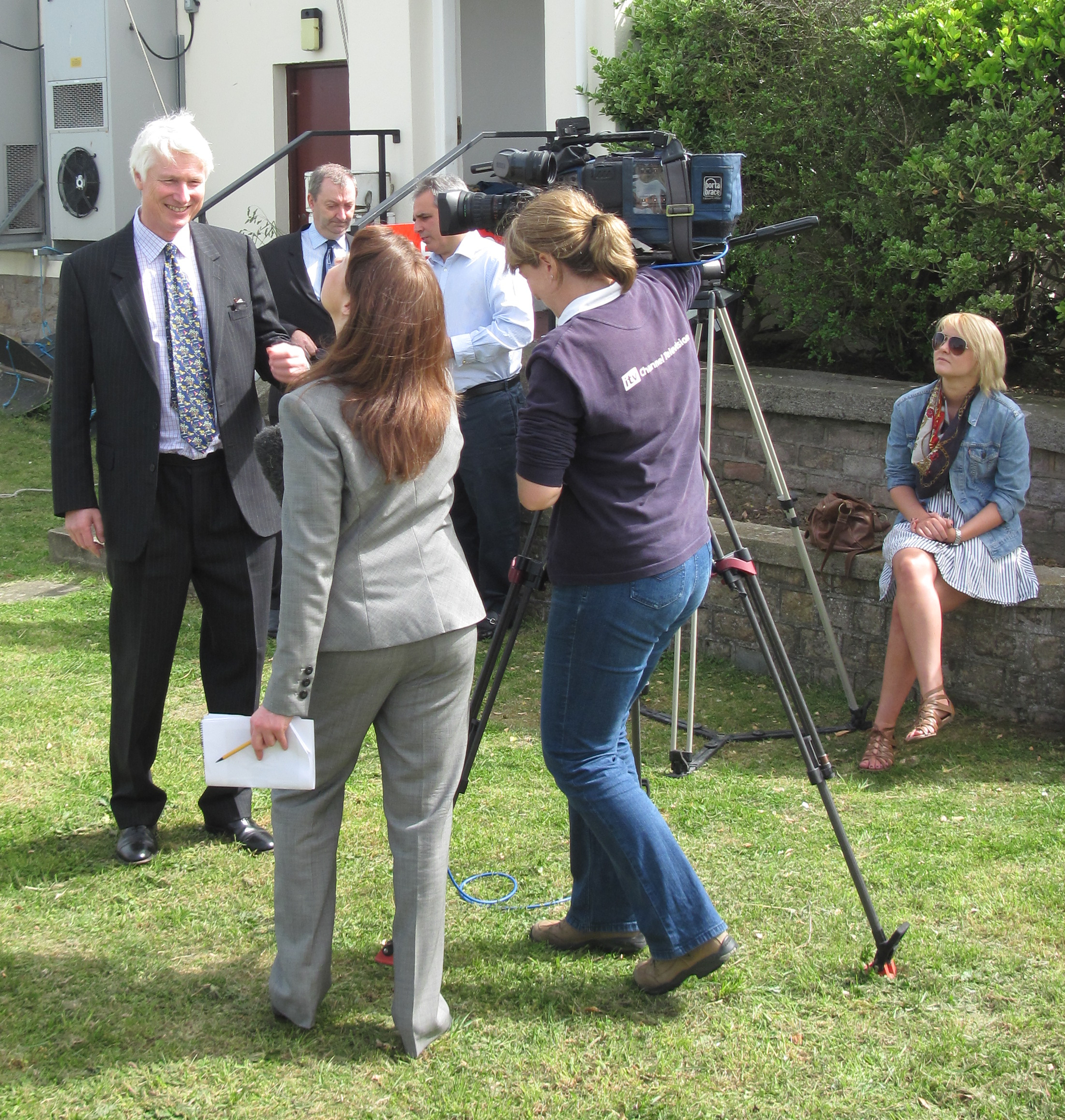
Channel TV News crew filming an interview with the Bailiff of Jersey in April 2011

There are currently five ITV Channel TV news bulletins produced on weekdays: two during Good Morning Britain (branded as Good Morning Channel on air), an update after the ITV Lunchtime News, the main 6pm programme which precedes the ITV Evening News, and a late news bulletin after ITV News at Ten.

There are also two weekend news updates, broadcast early evening on Saturdays and Sundays.

Its main competitor is BBC Channel Islands News.

== Production ==
=== Studios ===
Channel's news programmes are presented from the ITV Channel TV studios at Castle Quay in St Helier, Jersey. There is also a smaller Guernsey studio in St Sampson which is used for live interviews or pre-recorded segments.

The main Channel Report studio was previously based at La Pouquelaye in the north of St Helier.

=== Identity ===
Although Channel Television remained independently owned until 2011, during the 2000s, Channel Report adopted a localised version of the titles, graphics and music used by ITV plc-produced regional news programmes.

When the Channel Report name was dropped in January 2013 to bring it in line with the other ITV regional programmes, the historical "Channel TV" name was retained in order to distinguish between the Channel Islands' news service and the 24-hour ITV News Channel that was previously run by ITN between 2000 and 2005.

Since the rebrand, presenters refer to the programme on air as "ITV News on Channel" or "ITV News in the Channel Islands".

=== Transmission ===
ITV News Channel TV, and all of ITV Channel TV's other local programmes, have been produced in 1080i HD since production moved to Castle Quay in 2015. However, until December 2023 viewers in the region were only able to watch in 576i standard definition on Freeview and Sky.

Channel publishes the HD version of its nightly news programme on itv.com shortly after broadcast, making it available to watch for 24 hours.

It also occasionally simulcasts the programme online using Facebook Live, as it does with other special regional programmes to avoid disrupting the network ITV schedule.

== Notable presenters and reporters ==
=== Current ===
- Tim Backshall
- Jess Dunsdon
- Jonathan Wills
- Katie Chiang (Good Morning Britain bulletins)

=== Former ===
- Emma Baker (ITV Anglia)
- Paul Brown (deceased)
- Gary Burgess (deceased)
- Murray Dron
- Kristina Moore
- Andrew Joy
- Gemma Humphries
