= ITV News Anglia =

British TV programme (1990–)

- Also known as: Good Morning Anglia; Anglia Tonight (2004–2013); Anglia News (1990–2013)
- Genre: Regional news
- Presented by: Becky Jago; David Whiteley
- Country of origin: United Kingdom
- Original language: English

Production
- Executive producer: Emma Baker (Head of News)
- Production locations: Norwich, Norfolk, England
- Camera setup: Multi-camera
- Running time: 29 minutes (18:00 broadcast)
- Production company: ITV Anglia

Original release
- Network: ITV1 (ITV Anglia)
- Release: 9 July 1990 – present

Related
- ITV News; ITV Weather; Anglia Late Edition; About Anglia (1960-1990)

ITV News Anglia is a British television news service for the East of England, broadcast and produced by ITV Anglia.

== History ==
Anglia News replaced the long-running news magazine programme About Anglia on Monday, 9 July 1990. Initially, there were two sub-regional editions for the East (Norfolk, Suffolk and Essex), and West (Cambridgeshire, Northamptonshire, Bedfordshire, northern Hertfordshire, northern Buckinghamshire (including the City of Milton Keynes), southern Lincolnshire, southern Rutland and a small part of southern Leicestershire).

The main programme title was amended to Anglia News Tonight in September 2003 however just five months later in February 2004 it was simplified to Anglia Tonight. Both editions were broadcast from Norwich.

By 2008, Anglia News opts during GMTV and weekend bulletins had become pan-regional.

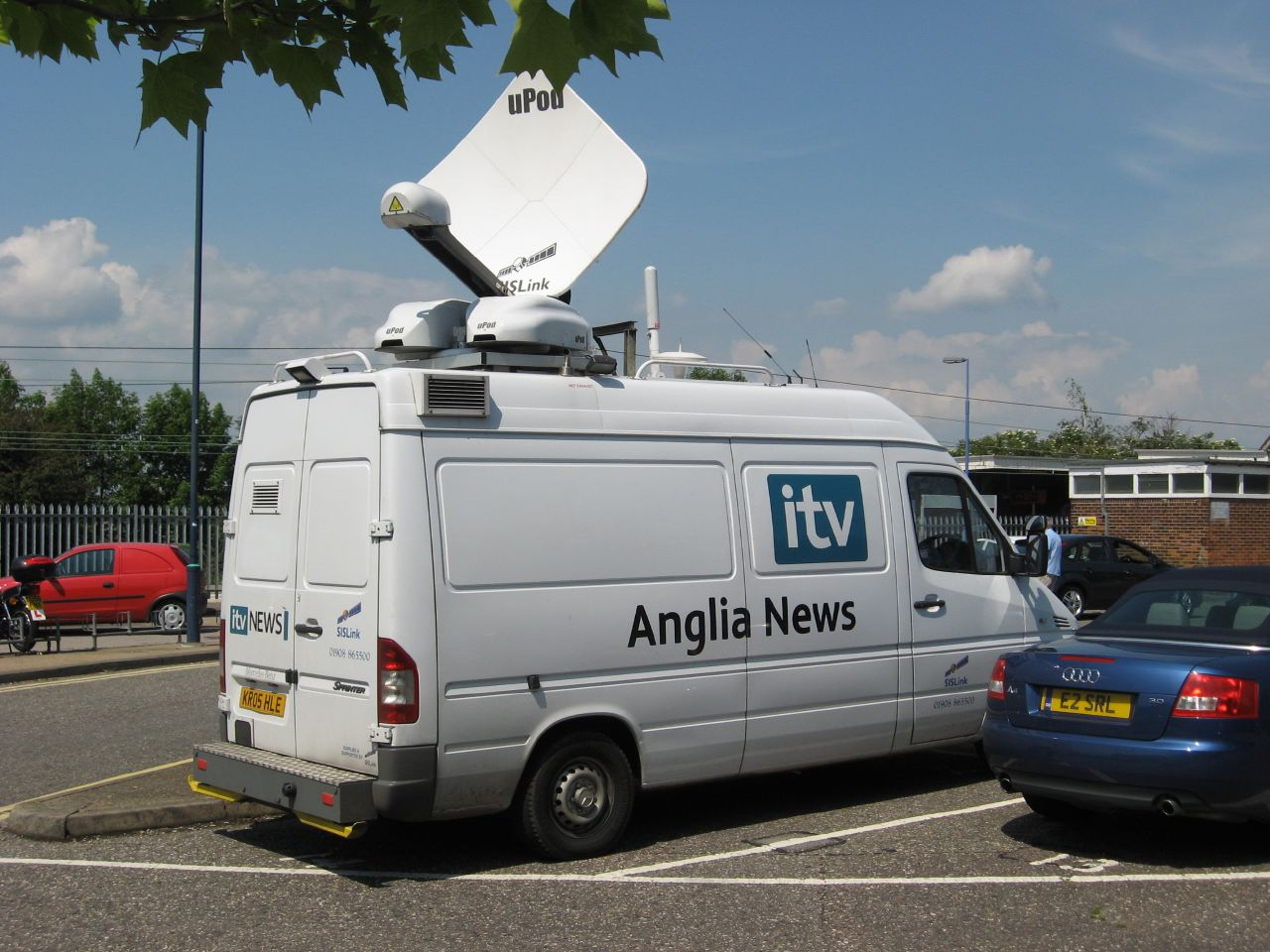
An ITV Anglia News van in 2007.

As of 12 February 2009, all programming on weekdays became pan-regional. The final sub-regional 6pm editions of Anglia Tonight were broadcast on Wednesday 11 February 2009. Becky Jago and Jonathan Wills anchored the programme in 2012.

The then remaining sub-regional elements were:

- A 6-minute opt-out during the main 6pm programme.
- The full 8-minute late weeknight bulletins.
- Localised weather forecasts.

Both sub-regional editions utilise exactly the same presenter(s) and studio/set, therefore one of the two opt-outs - depending on the day's news - is pre-recorded 'as live' shortly before broadcast.

On Monday, 14 January 2013, the service was relaunched and renamed as ITV News Anglia.

On 23 July 2013, proposals for a more localised Channel 3 news service were approved - ITV News Anglia reintroduced separate East and West programmes with a minimum of 20 minutes local news content during the half hour 6pm programme, in addition to separate weekday daytime and weekend bulletins for the two sub-regions. The expanded sub-regional service launched on Monday 16 September 2013.
