= Jonathan Wills =

British journalist

Jonathan Wills is a British journalist currently employed by ITV Channel.

Born in 1964 he has worked for ITN, where he was best known for presenting the sports segment during the now defunct ITV News at 10.30. He also fronted regional programme London Soccer Night for ITV London.

In late 2007, his contract with ITN ended and he joined ITV Anglia to present the East edition of their regional news programme Anglia Tonight. As of 12 February 2009, he was the main presenter of the merged East and West editions of ITV News Anglia, alongside Becky Jago for almost 14 years. His last programme was May 28, 2021.

He has now joined ITV Channel to present ITV News Channel TV alongside Jess Dunsdon.
