= Greatest Hits Radio Cumbria & South West Scotland =

Coordinates: 54.9297°N 2.9547°W

- Carlisle; United Kingdom
- Broadcast area: Cumbria and South West Scotland
- Frequencies: FM: 96.4 MHz (Carlisle); FM: 102.2 MHz (Workington); FM: 102.5 MHz (Penrith); FM: 103.4 MHz (Whitehaven); DAB: 11B
- RDS: Grt Hits
- Branding: The Good Times Sound Like This; Across Cumbria & South West Scotland

Programming
- Format: Classic Hits
- Network: Greatest Hits Radio

Ownership
- Owner: Bauer Media Audio UK
- Sister stations: Hits Radio Cumbria

History
- First air date: 14 April 1993
- Former names: CFMradio; CFM

Links
- Website: GHR Cumbria & South West Scotland

Greatest Hits Radio Cumbria & South West Scotland (formerly CFM) is an Independent Local Radio station based in Carlisle, England, owned and operated by Bauer as part of the Greatest Hits Radio network. It broadcasts to Cumbria and South West Scotland.

On 3 April 2023, almost 30 years to the day after launching, the station rebranded to Greatest Hits Radio. Previous breakfast show host Robbie Dee began presenting the 1pm - 4pm afternoon show, until the closure of the Carlisle studios on 27 September 2024.

As of June 2025, the station has a weekly audience of 72,000 listeners according to RAJAR.

== History ==
CFM logo used from 2008 until 2015.

Final logo used from 2015 until 2023.

The station was launched by its original owners, Border Television at 8am on 14 April 1993 when managing director and breakfast show host John Myers played "The Best" by Tina Turner as its first song.

Originally CFM only broadcast from their Caldbeck mast to Carlisle on 96.4 MHz and Penrith, from the top of Beacon Hill, on 102.5 MHz. In September 1995, they also started transmitting to West Cumbria from their transmitters at Broughton Moor (102.2 MHz) and Whitehaven (103.4 MHz).

From its launch, the station broadcast from premises adjacent to the ITV Border studios in Durranhill, Carlisle. In April 2010, CFM moved to a new base at Atlantic House in Kingstown, Carlisle.

In 2005, Emap bought CFM and branded it as one of its Big City Network of stations. Three years later, Emap was bought by Bauer.

Previously, CFM has won numerous industry awards including the Radio Academy's North West Station of the Year 2005 and Emap Station of the Year 2006. In May 2013, CFM became the first radio station to broadcast from a nuclear reprocessing site at Sellafield, West Cumbria.

CFM was one of two stations within the Hits Radio Network that did not broadcast on DAB (the other being Radio Borders based in Galashiels). This was due to the lack of local DAB multiplexes in Cumbria. However, in May 2019, Ofcom announced plans to advertise three local multiplexes in Cumbria & South West Scotland. Bauer made the sole application to Ofcom to run the North & West Cumbria DAB Multiplex, stating that they planned to place CFM as well as other Bauer owned stations on it, alongside BBC Radio Cumbria. In December 2019, Ofcom confirmed that the multiplex licence would be awarded to Bauer Digital Radio, with the multiplex originally expected to begin transmission in late 2020. However, due to the ongoing COVID-19 pandemic, this was pushed back to 1 December 2021.

== Network programming approval ==
In March 2021, it was announced that Bauer had received approval for full networking in North West England. It was hinted that CFM may move from its Carlisle studios to Bauer's Radio City Liverpool studios in the Radio City Tower, or the network's Manchester headquarters. It was also expressed that Bauer may reduce CFM's local programming to the minimum legal requirement of 3 hours per day.

On 21 April 2022, Bauer announced that local programming outside weekday breakfast would be replaced with further networked output from Hits Radio. Local news bulletins and traffic updates were not affected.

On 26 September 2024, Bauer announced that its remaining local programme presented by Robbie Dee would be ending on 27 September due to the closure of the station’s Carlisle studios on the same day. The last remaining local programme ended at 4:00pm on the same day. The move marked the official end of all local programming for the station as all programming for the station now comes from the Greatest Hits Radio network.

== Programming ==
All programming is networked and originates from Bauer's studios in Manchester, London and Glasgow.

=== News ===
Bauer's Manchester newsroom broadcasts local news bulletins hourly from 6am-7pm on weekdays and from 7am-1pm on weekends. Headlines are broadcast on the half-hour during weekday breakfast and drivetime shows, alongside traffic bulletins.

National bulletins from Sky News Radio are carried overnight with bespoke networked bulletins on weekend afternoons, usually originating from Bauer's Manchester newsroom.

== Notable past presenters ==
- Rich Clarke (Heart South)
- Lucy Horobin (Heart Dance)
- Dave Kelly (Radio City)
- John Myers (deceased)
- Jason King (Heart London)
- Joel Ross (Rock FM)
- Tim Shaw
- Andy Wood
- Robbie Dee
- Pete Moss
- Simon Williams
