= Stowmarket High School =

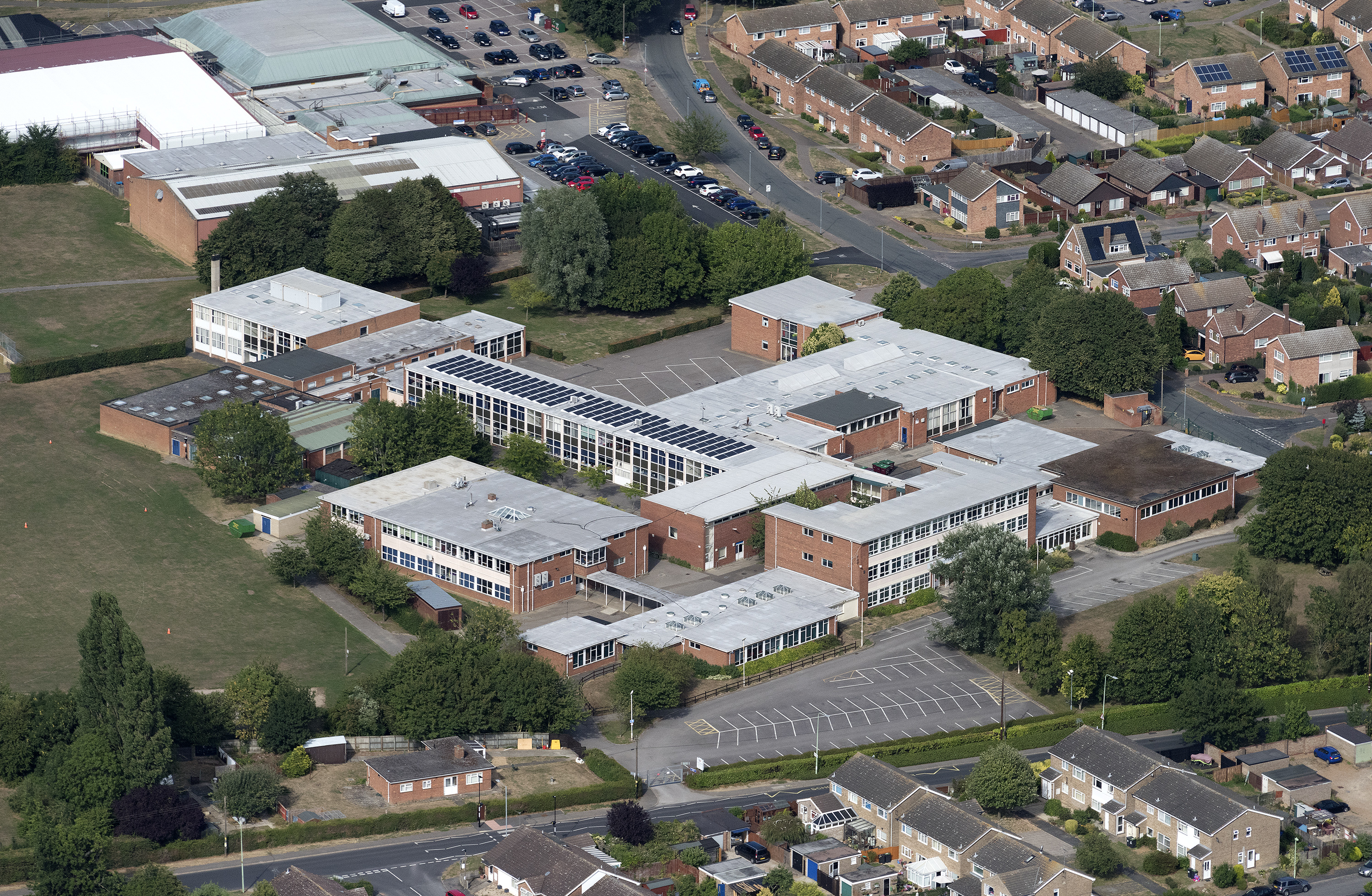

Location
- Onehouse Road; Stowmarket, Suffolk, IP14 1QR; England; 52°11′29″N 0°58′47″E

Information
- Type: Academy
- Motto: The Future, Our Business.
- Established: 1909
- Local authority: Suffolk
- Trust: Kingfisher Schools Trust
- Department for Education URN: 145055 Tables
- Ofsted: Reports
- Headteacher: Lucie Hernandez
- Gender: Co-educational
- Age: 11 to 16
- Enrolment: 855
- Colour: Teal/Black/Yellow
- Website: https://www.stowhigh.com/

Stowmarket High School is a co-educational secondary school located in Stowmarket, Suffolk in England. It was at one time known as Stowmarket Grammar School.

The school accommodates 855 students from school years 7 to 11.

Previously a community school administered by Suffolk County Council, in September 2018 Stowmarket High School converted to academy status. The school is now sponsored by the Kingfisher Schools Trust (Previously known as Waveney Valley Academies Trust). The school no longer has a sixth-form as of the 2020–2021 academic year.

== Notable former pupils ==
- Kerry Ellis – actress and singer
- Becky Jago – ITV newsreader
- Diarmaid MacCulloch – Oxford Professor of the History of the Church
- Gareth Snell - politician and former MP for Stoke-on-Trent Central
- Sophie Stanton – actress
