= Representing Border =

- Presented by: Kieran Andrews
- Theme music composer: Rage Music
- Country of origin: United Kingdom
- Original language: English

Production
- Executive producer: Catherine Houlihan
- Production locations: The Scottish Parliament, Edinburgh
- Running time: 23 minutes

Original release
- Network: ITV1 (ITV Border Scotland)
- Release: 2014 – present

Related
- Border Life; Lookaround

Representing Border is a regional television current affairs programme, produced by ITV Tyne Tees & Border, covering political issues from Holyrood, Westminster and local government, affecting Dumfries and Galloway and the Scottish Borders.

The programme was launched on Monday 6 January 2014, as part of an enhanced sub-regional service for southern Scotland, introduced to address concerns over coverage of the Border region since the company's operations were merged with those of ITV Tyne Tees in 2009.

Representing Border is produced from ITV Tyne Tees & Border's Scottish Parliament bureau in Edinburgh and airs on Tuesday, Wednesday and Thursday nights, following the late-night Border news bulletin. The programme is not broadcast in Cumbria, where networked programming continues to air. The program uses the same theme tune as STV's Scotland Tonight which airs in the same timeslot in the rest of Scotland.
