= Border Life =

- Country of origin: United Kingdom

Original release
- Network: ITV1 (ITV Border Scotland)
- Release: 12 January 2014 – present

Related
- Lookaround; Representing Border

Border Life is an ITV magazine programme serving the south of Scotland.

== Overview ==
Typically broadcast most weeks on ITV Border Scotland on Fridays at 19:00, it opts out of the national ITV Evening News.

The programme features topical stories and features from Dumfries and Galloway and the Borders. The programme has been on air since 2014 and is currently produced from ITV Tyne Tees & Border’s Carlisle offices.

== Current Presenters ==
- Fiona Armstrong
- Sandy McCracken

== Former Presenters ==
- Emma Baker
- Fiona McIlwraith
