= Seven Seas (company) =

British business

Seven Seas Limited
- Company type: Subsidiary
- Industry: Health
- Founded: 1935; 91 years ago
- Headquarters: Feltham, United Kingdom
- Products: Vitamins, minerals and supplements
- Parent: Procter & Gamble
- Website: www.seven-seas.com

Seven Seas Ltd. is a supplier of vitamins, minerals, and supplements in the United Kingdom and abroad. It began in 1935 when a group of trawler owners in Hull formed a co-operative venture called British Cod Liver Oil (BCLO) Producers to exploit one of the fishing industry's most valuable by-products. Kenneth MacLennan, previously of Lever Brothers, became General Manager of BCLO in 1936 to add relevant commercial experience to the then-board of trawler owners.

== Benefits ==
The benefits of cod liver oil had been known since the 1700s, with its first widespread usage for bone diseases around that time by Dr. Samuel Kay as referenced by the Manchester Infirmary. However, despite its value as a rich source of essential vitamins A & D for human nutrition, in its early days BCLO sold its greatest volume to the animal feed industry under simple descriptions such as Cod Oil, Pale Oil, Cattle Oil, Ruby Oil and Dark Cod Oil.

== Products ==
The company's first branded product was a standardised veterinary product named Solvitax. Medicinal cod liver oil was still to be produced in the early years. With the onset of war came a marked change of focus as the company's cod liver oil played a vital part in supplementing the meager wartime diet of the whole nation. The company also produced a vitamin C rich product for the Ministry of Food, known as 'Welfare' Orange Juice. It continued to do so in the post-war years too, until sometime after rationing finished in the 1950s.

== Location ==
The offices and production facilities were situated on the south side of St. Andrew's Dock in Hull, i.e. next to the fish dock there with its hundreds of trawlers, but eventually these were not large enough to cope with the company's plans to market and meet the demand for high-quality veterinary oil and produce medicinal oil to conform to pharmaceutical standards. A new factory was subsequently built in Marfleet, the Marfleet Refinery, at the time the world's largest cod liver oil refinery, processing one-third of the world's total volume.

== New beginnings ==
After giving the product away to the public for around 15 years because 'it was good for them', the company took on the challenge of convincing the public to visit the local chemist and pay for the product. At the same time, the nutritional health of the nation improved along with its diet as rationing ceased, and cod-liver oil was being displaced by the introduction of pleasanter ways of taking vitamins such as Haliborange tablets (a brand the company subsequently acquired 40 years later). In an effort to advertise cod liver oil, a large fish was created (King Cod) and placed on the back of one of the BCLO trucks. A loudspeaker was fixed in the mouth of the fish to relay sales messages. King Cod was taken around the UK with "A Life on the Ocean Wave" blaring out of the loudspeaker.

== Change in ownership ==
BCLO was taken over by Imperial Foods, a division of Imperial Tobacco, in 1974.

It was not until April 1982 that Seven Seas Health Care Ltd. was set up as a subsidiary of the Marfleet Refining Company.

Seven Seas was acquired in 1986 as part of the purchase of Imperial Tobacco by Hanson Trust.

In 1996, Seven Seas Ltd. was purchased by the Merck Group.

In 2019, Seven Seas was purchased by Procter & Gamble as part of its acquisition of Merck's consumer health products.

== Operations ==
Seven Seas operated from its base in Kingston upon Hull, with its main brands including Seven Seas Cod Liver Oil, Seven Seas JointCare, Multibionta, and Haliborange. In April 2015, the Sevens Seas manufacturing facility in Hull was closed, and the sales and marketing of the brand was moved to Merck's headquarters in London. In 2016, it was one of the biggest selling branded over-the-counter medications sold in Great Britain, with sales of £25.7 million.
