= Selkirk transmitting station =

Transmitter station in the Scottish Borders, Scotland

Selkirk
- Location within Scottish Borders
- Mast height: 238.8 metres (783 ft)
- Coordinates: 55.555833°N 2.793333°W
- Grid reference: NT500294
- Built: 1961
- BBC region: BBC Scotland
- ITV region: ITV Border (Scotland)

The Selkirk transmitting station is a telecommunications facility located next to Lindean Loch, near Selkirk in the Scottish Borders. It includes a 229.1 metres (752 ft) high guyed steel lattice mast, surmounted by a UHF television transmitting antenna array, which brings the overall height of the structure to 238.8 metres (783 ft). It is owned and operated by Arqiva.

== Services ==
It is the main television broadcasting station for the Borders area, and was the first high power main station in the United Kingdom to be upgraded as part of digital switchover. This upgrade was completed on 20 November 2008, when the analogue signal was turned off and replaced by high power digital television signals.

Selkirk also broadcasts a number of radio services, including local commercial station Greatest Hits Radio Scottish Borders and North Northumberland, national station Classic FM, and DAB multiplexes from the BBC and Digital One.

== History ==
Selkirk was built by the Independent Television Authority (ITA) in 1961 in order to bring the commercial franchisee Border Television to south east Scotland, using the 405 line monochrome system on VHF channel 13.

The other Border Television transmitter was the Caldbeck transmitting station, which opened in September 1961. Border Television started broadcasting on December 1 1961. The first broadcaster was the announcer Mary Marquis.

405 line television was discontinued in the UK in 1985. 625 line UHF television was introduced at Selkirk in March 1972, carrying BBC1, BBC2 and Border Television (ITV) . Channel 4 was added when it launched in November 1982, and Channel 5 was added in March 1997. Radio Borders started from Selkirk in January 1990, with Classic FM following in November 1996. The Digital One and BBC DAB services both commenced in October 2007. BBC national FM services are transmitted from neighbouring Ashkirk transmitting station.

== Channels listed by frequency ==
=== Digital television ===
Frequency	UHF	kW	Operator
562.000 MHz	32	10	BBC A
570.000 MHz	33	5	SDN
578.000 MHz	34	10	Digital 3&4
586.000 MHz	35	10	BBC B
594.000 MHz	36	5	Arqiva A
690.000 MHz	48	5	Arqiva B

=== Analogue radio (FM VHF) ===
Frequency	kW	Service
96.8 MHz	5	Greatest Hits Radio Scottish Borders and North Northumberland
100.9 MHz	5	Classic FM

=== Digital radio (DAB) ===
Frequency	Block	kW	Operator
223.936 MHz	12A	10	Digital One
225.648 MHz	12B	10	BBC National DAB

=== Analogue television ===
All Analogue television services ceased in 2008. It was the first transmitter in the UK to switch off analogue signals.

Frequency	UHF	kW	Service
719.25 MHz	52	50	Channel 5
743.25 MHz	55	50	BBC1 Scotland
775.25 MHz	59	50	ITV Border
799.25 MHz	62	50	BBC2 Scotland
823.25 MHz	65	50	Channel 4

Digital Switchover: On the 6th of November 2008, BBC2 Scotland ceased on UHF 62 and High power BBC A launched for the first time. On the 20th of November 2008 the remaining analogue channels switched off and viewers with BT Vision, Freeview & Top Up TV needed to retune.

== See also ==
- List of masts
- List of tallest buildings and structures in Great Britain
- List of radio stations in the United Kingdom
