= Becky Jago =

British television presenter

- Born: Rebecca Joanne Gunton; 20 April 1976 (age 49); Bury St Edmunds, Suffolk, England
- Education: Stowmarket High School, University of Bedfordshire
- Occupation: News Presenter
- Years active: 1997–present
- Employer(s): ITV; ITV Anglia
- Known for: TV weather/news presenter
- Height: 5 ft 7 in (170 cm)
- Children: 3

Rebecca Joanne Jago (née Gunton; born 20 April 1976 in Bury St Edmunds, Suffolk) is an English television news presenter, currently employed by ITV Anglia.

== Career ==
Jago attended Stowmarket High School from 1989 to 1994. She graduated from the University of Bedfordshire in 1997 with a BA in Media Performance and then spent some time in Japan, where she worked in a public bar.

Jago started her career at Vibe FM radio station (subsequently known as Vibe 105-108, and now known as Kiss 105-108), working her way up from travel news presenter to become the co-presenter on the breakfast show. While working for Vibe FM, she was interviewed by producers of ITV News Anglia for a documentary, they then hired her as their weather presenter, and she also appeared on Channel 5's The Wright Stuff, where she would introduce phone-in contributors - their first 'Booth Girl.'

In November 2001, she joined the CBBC children's news programme Newsround, becoming one of the two main presenters.

Jago joined Capital London on 28 February 2003 to be Chris Tarrant's foil on Capital Breakfast. She stayed with the new host Johnny Vaughan after Tarrant left in 2004, but her involvement ended when her contract ended in December 2004. She then had stints as a reporter on GMTV's Entertainment Today programme, and Sky Sports News, before returning to ITV Anglia in May 2005 as a feature reporter and presenter. Since 12 February 2009, Jago has been the co-presenter of ITV News Anglia, alongside David Whiteley. On 12th October 2025 she presented the national ITV Evening News (and the subsequent ITV News London from the same studio), but is remaining with ITV News Anglia.

== Personal life ==
An Ipswich Town supporter, Jago played football from school level, and in various works teams. Her mother died of breast cancer, and Jago supports charities in this area.

In 2004, Jago was locked in a giant kennel along with MPs Paul Burstow, Evan Harris and Ivan Henderson, actress Liza Goddard, BBC Newsround presenter Lizzie Greenwood and TV presenter Liz Bonnin in a stunt to launch the annual RSPCA Week to raise awareness and funds.

Jago married in December 2004, and lives in Norwich, Norfolk with her husband and her twin sons. On 17 October 2012 she gave birth to her third child, another boy. Jago returned to ITV News Anglia on 5 November 2013.
