= Lookaround =

British regional TV news programme (since 1961)

- Also known as: ITV News Lookaround; ITV News Border; Good Morning Border
- Genre: Regional news
- Presented by: Amy Lea; Ian Payne
- Country of origin: United Kingdom
- Original language: English

Production
- Executive producers: Michaela Byrne (Head of News and Programmes)
- Production locations: The Watermark, Gateshead, Tyne and Wear, England (2009–present); Harraby, Carlisle (1961–2009)
- Editor: Catherine Houlihan
- Camera setup: Multi-camera
- Running time: 29 minutes (18:00 broadcast)
- Production companies: ITV Tyne Tees & Border (2009–present); ITV Border (1961–2009)

Original release
- Network: ITV1 (ITV Border)
- Release: 1961 – present

Related
- ITV News; ITV Weather; ITV News Tyne Tees; Around the House; Border Life; Representing Border

ITV News Lookaround is the name of a British television news service produced by ITV Tyne Tees & Border and broadcasting to the ITV Border region.

== Overview ==
Lookaround is produced and broadcast from studios at The Watermark, Gateshead with reporters also based at offices in Carlisle and Edinburgh. Both regional services (i.e ITV News Tyne Tees and Lookaround) utilise exactly the same presenter(s) and studio/set, therefore one of the two programmes - depending on the day's news - is pre-recorded 'as live' shortly before broadcast.

The "Lookaround" news service transmits to a vast area – central and northern Cumbria, Dumfries and Galloway, parts of South Ayrshire, the Scottish Borders and overlap areas of Northumberland. The Isle of Man was also served by ITV Border until 2009.

Viewers in Barrow-in-Furness and Millom receive ITV Granada Reports due to these towns receiving their TV signal from the Winter Hill TV transmitter.

== History ==
=== ITV Border ===
Border Television's regional news service began on 1 September 1961 from studios at Harraby, Carlisle. Initially producing short evening bulletins and a topical magazine programme called Focus, Lookaround would become the station's flagship daily programme later on in the decade. Shorter bulletins were known as Border News. Meanwhile, Tyne Tees Television had its own wholly separate news services. Lookaround is also known locally in Cumbrian dialect as "Border Crack an' Deekabout"

In 1989, Border began providing a sub-regional news service for viewers served by the Selkirk transmitter, consisting of a short opt-out during Lookaround each weeknight. In April 1999, the opt-out was extended to cover Dumfries and Galloway and a dedicated Scottish news bulletin was introduced on weekday lunchtimes. Border also opened an Edinburgh bureau to provide coverage of the Scottish Parliament.

=== ITV Tyne Tees & Border ===
==== Proposed merger ====
In September 2007, ITV plc announced that ITV Border news operations would be merged with ITV Tyne Tees, subject to the approval from the regulator Ofcom.

On 24 April 2008, a campaign to save the ITV Border news operation arrived in London with a petition of 9000 signed by viewers. This was ahead of MPs meeting with industry regulator Ofcom.

==== Ofcom authorises ITV's plans ====
On 26 September 2008, Ofcom authorised ITV's plans to save £40m a year by making regional programming cutbacks. These include axing mid-morning bulletins on weekdays and lunchtime bulletins at weekends, plus merging a number of regions and halving the number of non-news regional programmes.

On 30 September 2008, it was announced the number of ITV Border employees would be slashed from 64 to 13.

Following a survey of Isle of Man viewers in autumn 2008, coverage of the Isle of Man was transferred from ITV Border to ITV Granada in July 2009.

==== Lookaround begins transmitting from Gateshead ====
Lookaround retains an office in Carlisle where the news editor, planning and online teams are based along with correspondents, but as of February 2009, the programme is transmitted from ITV Tyne Tees' studios at The Watermark, Gateshead. The lead presenters were announced as the then North East Tonight South edition presenters Ian Payne and Pam Royle. Then Lookaround presenters Tim Backshall and Helen Carnell were redeployed as a news reporter and early presenter respectively. As part of the merger, six district reporters were appointed – working from home unless based in Carlisle or Edinburgh. The district reporters announced were Victoria Hoe in Kendal, Hannah Lomas in Carlisle, Lee Madan in Selkirk, Stuart Pollitt in Whitehaven, Olivia Richwald in Dumfries and Kathryn Samson in Edinburgh.

ITV Tyne Tees & Border was formed on 25 February 2009, with Lookaround and North East Tonight titles retained for the 6pm programme and late bulletin each weekday, whilst shorter bulletins were known simply as Tyne Tees & Border News.

The then remaining sub-regional elements were:

- The opening 15 minutes of the main 6pm programme.
- Full late night bulletins on weeknights, following ITV News at Ten.
- Localised weather forecasts.

On 14 January 2013, the news service was relaunched and rebranded as ITV News Lookaround.

==== Southern Scotland coverage reviewed ====
On 23 May 2012, ITV announced proposals for further changes on its regional news programming, with "some content replaced with aggregate of news from several regions" and an expansion in sub-regional coverage. In November, upon the renewal of ITV's licences for a further ten years, Culture Secretary Maria Millar asked Ofcom to look into proposals for the Border region which would leave Southern Scotland viewers without "the same level of Scottish programming as viewers elsewhere in the country", covered by STV.

In a consultation document, Ofcom set out two potential options, with any changes coming into effect in 2015 at the latest. ITV proposed re-introducing a full news service exclusively for the Border region, including the return of half-hour editions of Lookaround and short news bulletins, as well as introducing a weekly current affairs programme for the region. The second option was to enforce ITV Border to broadcast 90 minutes a week of non-news programming, including programming from STV.

Press reports indicated a political split in opinion on the issue. In April, the Borders Chamber and members of the local authority at Newton and the Scottish Borders Chamber of Commerce publicly supported the second option – with the Chamber calling for a national ITV service for the whole of Scotland.

Two members of the UK Government – Scottish Secretary of State Michael Moore and deputy David Mundell (both MPs in the Border region) – backed ITV's proposal for a Border current affairs programme while the Scottish Government called for STV programming (including Scotland Tonight) to be simulcast.

On 16 May 2013, the first televised Scottish independence debate was broadcast on STV's Scotland Tonight across northern and central Scotland, however viewers in the south of the country were unable to see it as ITV Border took the decision not to broadcast it, leading to further criticism from politicians in the region. Michael Jermey, ITV Director of News and Current Affairs, pledged some programming from STV would air on ITV Border.

On 23 July 2013, OFCOM announced it had approved the second option of Scottish non-news programming. The regulator also ordered ITV to reopen the former Border Scotland service previously utilized for split news bulletins and simulcasts of select STV programming. The opt-out service was launched on Freeview in January 2014 and consists of a thrice-weekly political programme, Representing Border, and a weekly feature series, Border Life. The bespoke local programming is not seen in Cumbria, where network programming continues to air.

==== Lookaround fully restored ====
On 14 June 2013, it was reported Lookaround would be restored to a full 30-minute programme along with ITV recruiting journalists for an Autumn launch.

A month later, Ofcom approved ITV's plans to restore Border's news service. All short bulletins – including daytime and weekend updates – are now exclusive to the Border region, however with the minutage decreased. The changes came into effect on 16 September 2013.

==== 2020 - present ====
From March 2020, due to the COVID-19 pandemic, ITV Tyne Tees & Border services were impacted. Running times of all short bulletins were reduced. The main 6pm programme was now fronted by a single presenter instead of two.

On 23 November 2020, it was announced the main 6pm programme would return to two presenters from that night, with a slightly modified studio to allow for social distancing.

On 28 March 2021, ITV Tyne Tees & Border announced that Amy Lea would be the new co-presenter of the main weekday news programme alongside Ian Payne as of 29 March 2021, taking over from Pam Royle who left ITV on 26 March 2021.

Preceded by N/A	RTS: Television Journalism; Nations and Regions News Programme (The Cumbria Shootings – Day 1); 2011	Succeeded by ITV News Calendar
