= Radio Borders =

Scottish radio station

Edinburgh; United Kingdom
- Broadcast area: Border region and north Northumberland
- Frequency: FM: 96.8 MHz Selkirk; 102.3 MHz Berwick-upon-Tweed; 103.1 MHz Peebles; 103.4 MHz Eyemouth
- RDS: Borders
- Branding: Across the Scottish Borders and North Northumberland

Programming
- Format: Contemporary hit radio
- Network: Greatest Hits Radio

Ownership
- Owner: Bauer Media Audio UK

History
- First air date: 22 January 1990; 35 years ago

Links
- Webcast: Planet Radio
- Website: planetradio.co.uk/greatest-hits/borders/

Radio Borders was an Independent Local Radio station, originally based in Tweedbank before moving into studios at St James Quarter, Edinburgh, in October 2022. The station was owned and operated by Bauer as part of the Hits Radio Network. It broadcast to the Scottish Borders and north Northumberland.

As of December 2022, the station had a weekly audience of 45,000 listeners according to RAJAR.

On 3 April 2023, Radio Borders was replaced with Greatest Hits Radio Scottish Borders and North Northumberland.

Radio Borders logo used from 1998 to 2015.

== Programming ==
Networked programming originated from Clyde 1 in Clydebank, Forth 1 in Edinburgh and Hits Radio in Manchester.

Local programming was produced and broadcast from Radio Forth's Edinburgh studios on weekdays from 6-10a.m., presented by Gregor Runciman and Lynsey Gibson.

=== News and sport ===
Radio Borders broadcast local news bulletins hourly from 6a.m. to 7p.m. on weekdays and from 7a.m. to 1p.m. on Saturdays and Sundays. Headlines were broadcast on the half-hour during weekday breakfast and drivetime shows, including sports reports. Traffic bulletins were presenter-led and broadcast at 20 and 40 minutes past the hour between 6 and 9a.m. as well as between 4 and 7p.m.

Local news bulletins were produced in conjunction with Radio Forth's newsroom in Edinburgh and Metro Radio's newsroom in Newcastle.

National bulletins from Sky News Radio were carried overnight with bespoke networked Scottish bulletins at weekends, produced from Radio Clyde's newsroom in Clydebank.
