= ITV Border =

British TV region for Cumbria and South Scotland

- Logo used since 2013

- Type: Region of television network
- Branding: ITV1
- Country: UK
- First air date: 1 September 1961 (65 years ago)
- TV transmitters: Caldbeck, Selkirk (formerly Richmond Hill, Whitehaven)
- Headquarters: Carlisle
- Broadcast area: Cumbria (majority); Dumfries and Galloway (majority); Scottish Borders (formerly Isle of Man)
- Owner: ITV plc
- Dissolved: lost on-air identity on 27 October 2002 (now known as ITV1 at all times)
- Former names: Border Television
- Picture format: 1080i HDTV, downscaled to 576i for SDTV
- Affiliation: ITV
- Official website: itv.com/border

ITV Border, previously Border Television and commonly referred to as simply Border, is the Channel 3 service provided by ITV Broadcasting Limited for the England/Scotland border region, covering most of Cumbria and Dumfries and Galloway, the Scottish Borders and parts of Northumberland. The TV service previously covered the Isle of Man from 26 March 1965 until 15 July 2009.

Border Television was taken over by Granada plc in 2001. In 2002, as part of a network-wide re-launch, the name Border Television was dropped from on-air presentation, continuity and idents before networked programming in favour of the national ITV1 brand. ITV1 Border was used before regional programming. In November 2008, the licence for the region was transferred from Border Television to ITV Broadcasting Limited. The legal name of the company was changed on 29 December 2006 from Border Television Ltd to ITV Border Ltd. The company was dissolved on 7 February 2023.

As of 25 February 2009, the regional news programme Lookaround is broadcast from the studios of ITV Tyne Tees in Gateshead with news and advertising staff based at offices in Carlisle and Edinburgh. On 16 September 2013, a full regional news service for the Border region was restored as part of an extensive relaunch of the station's local programming. A sub-regional service for the south of Scotland was reintroduced in January 2014. The third channel in the rest of Scotland is STV.

== History ==
=== Launch ===
In May 1960, the Independent Television Authority (ITA) invited applicants to provide the ITV service for the Borders region – an area that covered the English counties of Westmorland and Cumberland, the south of Scotland and later, the Isle of Man.

Prior to this, the ITA had moved away from the idea of satellite stations (companies owned by distant management as seen with Southern Television in the south of England) towards companies that had strong local ownership. The contract covered two new transmitters at Caldbeck, near Carlisle and Selkirk, near Saint Boswells in the Scottish Borders.

Granada Television and ABC Weekend Television laid a claim to providing service via Caldbeck, while Scottish Television expressed a strong interest in Selkirk. The ITA rejected both these in favour of a new contract area and a new company to serve it – although they stipulated the area to be "marginal" in their plans and that applicants had to present a very strong business case for the area as well as the contract.

Two applications were received, one from Solway Television and another from Border Television. Border were chosen on the basis of their plans and management which was considered local, but still featured names from large business (the then chairman of Reuters for example) and from the world of education.

Launch was scheduled for February 1961. Construction problems with both transmitters resulted in delays until May 1961. As this led into the summer holiday period, Border asked for a launch delay, as the break would affect advertising revenue. Border launched on Friday 1 September 1961, the twelfth ITV station to go to air.

During its first year of operation, Border made a profit unlike other regional companies in their initial year. By its second year, it had covered its launch costs, due mainly to a 60% audience penetration in an area that, at the time, was largely ignored by the BBC. On Friday 26 March 1965, the Isle of Man was officially added to Border's coverage area.

=== 1970s and 1980s ===
Initially, Border produced little for the network and concentrated on local programming, most notably its flagship local news programme Lookaround. Later, when ITV and the BBC were given permission to extend broadcasting hours to daytime, Border carved a niche for providing the ITV network with afternoon quizzes and light entertainment. Derek Batey, Border TV's Assistant Controller of Programmes, became the frontman for one of ITV's most popular daytime quiz shows of the 1970s and early 1980s, Mr. and Mrs.. A separate version of Mr. and Mrs. was also produced by HTV at the same time. Batey also presented and produced the long-running chat show Look Who's Talking. Meanwhile, a 15-minute music show, The Sound of ..., was seen across several ITV regions and featured The Spinners, British folk music band The Settlers and other similar artists.

Financial and industrial problems began to hit the company during the 1970s – a fall in net profits to just £13,587, led to job losses and a cut in programme production in September 1975. In November 1978, a dispute with the ACTT (Association of Cinematograph, Television and Allied Technicians) led to 40 staff at the Durranhill studios being locked out for three weeks by management – several members of staff resorted to a sit in until the strike ended in stalemate and compromise.

By 1980, Border was again in severe financial trouble owing to a national economic downturn which affected advertising revenue on the whole ITV network, with the station losing £70,000 before tax in October 1981. The situation was deemed so serious that at one point the company considered not re-applying for its licence when it expired in December 1981 – though it proved successful, as it did in July 1967 and October 1991.

From January 1982, Border began broadcasting to south Cumbria from the Kendal transmitter, which previously carried Granada. Border had lobbied the IBA for over a decade to serve the southern Lake District – a move backed by Cumbria County Council. On the Isle of Man, officials voiced a preference to switch signals to Granada, citing inclusion in regional news coverage would benefit the tourism industry, with direct ferry links from Liverpool and Heysham.

In November 1982, Border closed for a month in a dispute over new technology, which ended only after letters asking for an improvement in industrial relations were withdrawn. The dispute led to several members of management resigning – with Jim Graham moving from the BBC to become managing director and Paul Corley joining as director of programming. Graham and Corley began to transform Border by targeting a greater presence on the ITV network, despite the company's weak financial position.

Graham hired Melvyn Bragg to present new programming. The launch of Channel 4 in 1982 also bolstered Border's network portfolio – providing extra finance for many of the new programmes being produced from the Carlisle studios (themselves being expanded) and commissioning to make a number of programmes, most notably Land of the Lakes (presented by Melvyn Bragg), a music show entitled Bliss (hosted by Muriel Gray) and Border's very first sitcom, The Groovy Fellers with Jools Holland and Rowland Rivron.

Border expanded into children's programming during the 1980s with The Joke Machine, Crush A Grape, Pick A Number, Krankies Television, BMX Beat and contributions to Saturday morning series Get Fresh and Ghost Train, produced in conjunction with Tyne Tees Television, and others. Melvyn Bragg became deputy chairman of Border Television in 1985 and its chairman in 1990. In 1996, he left the post but remained on the board.

=== Opt-out services ===
In 1989, Border began providing a sub-regional service for Scottish Borders viewers served by the Selkirk transmitter, consisting of a short opt-out during Lookaround each weeknight. In April 1999, the opt-out was extended to cover Dumfries and Galloway, and a dedicated Scottish news bulletin was introduced on weekday lunchtimes.

In August 2000, Border began to use the opt-out service to provide split coverage of sports and occasional political programming. The station also opened an Edinburgh bureau to provide coverage of the Scottish Parliament.

=== Acquisition and takeover ===
Border was unopposed in retaining its ITV franchise in 1991, with a bid of £52,000 per year (or £1,000 per week).

In 1993, Border began its first venture into commercial radio when it was awarded the licence for a new regional radio station serving Central Scotland – Scot FM – in partnership with Grampian Television. By May 1995, Grampian had bought out Border's stake in the company.

Border's second venture was Century Radio, conceived as the second regional station for North East England, on 1 September 1994, with John Myers (a former continuity announcer) as managing director and John Simons as programming director. During the rest of the 1990s, Border launched an additional Century radio station in Manchester while holding interests in a number of other stations including Sun FM in Sunderland and Cumbria's CFM Radio, and in 1997 formed a subsidiary, Border Radio Holdings, for its radio business.

In March 2000, a takeover battle broke out between Capital Radio and Scottish Radio Holdings for Border – the latter went on to state that Border's ongoing status as a truly independent media business was no longer a realistic option in a consolidating industry. By April, Capital Radio had purchased the company and the following year sold Border's television assets to Granada Media Group for £50.5 million. Rumours over its future persistently dogged Border and it trod a difficult path to balance the interests of three different nations. As with many of the other ITV regional stations, a steady reduction in the range and quantity of its output continued its decline.

In July 2006, it was announced that the Berwick-upon-Tweed transmitter was to transfer to Tyne Tees as part of the preparations for the digital switchover of the Border region in 2008, and to bring Berwick into line with the rest of the North East which was scheduled to switch over to digital in 2012. The transfer took effect from 13 December 2006, although Border news programmes still carry stories about Berwick-upon-Tweed due to its proximity to the eastern Scottish Borders.

=== Merger ===
In 2008, the United Kingdom began its five-year programme to cease analogue television broadcasts as part of the switchover to Digital television starting with Border.

Towards the end of his tenure as ITV plc executive chairman, Michael Grade began dismantling the ITV regional layout, arguing the existence of ITV Border "no longer makes sense" relative to the regional audience it serves. On 12 September 2007, Grade announced plans to close ITV Border and merge the region with ITV Tyne Tees.

On 25 September 2008, Ofcom gave ITV the go ahead to merge the Border and Tyne Tees operations from early in 2009. Following a survey of Isle of Man viewers in autumn 2008, coverage of the Isle of Man was transferred from ITV Border to ITV Granada on Thursday 16 July 2009.

ITV Border's own regional news service ceased production on Tuesday 24 February 2009, replaced by a dual-regional service the next day. The sub-regional service for southern Scotland was also closed. The main ITV Border newsroom is now based in the Kingstown area of Carlisle with reporters living and working in Carlisle, Dumfries, Edinburgh, Kendal, Selkirk and Whitehaven.

ITV Border won the RTS awards for Best News Programme: Nations and Regions for Lookaround, whilst ITV Tyne Tees & Border was nominated in three categories in February 2011.

==== Restoring a full regional service ====
On 23 July 2013, proposals to reintroduce a full service of news and regional programmes for the ITV Border region were approved by OFCOM. In September 2013, Lookaround was restored as a full half-hour programme on weekdays with shorter daytime and weekend bulletins reintroduced during the month. The programme continues to be broadcast from Gateshead with extra journalists recruited for newsgathering in the Border region, including a Scottish political editor in Edinburgh, a sports correspondent and district reporters.

ITV Border was also required to reopen its former opt-out service for southern Scotland, previously used to broadcast split news bulletins and select STV programming. A minimum of 90 minutes a week of bespoke local programming is broadcast on ITV Border Scotland while viewers in Cumbria continue to receive network output. The opt-out service was launched on Monday 6 January 2014 and initially broadcast over Freeview only, with programmes also available on the ITV Border website. From mid-March 2015, the split Border Scotland service became available to satellite viewers, replacing Border (England) in the relevant area.

== Studios ==
Unlike some of the new ITV stations at the time, Border constructed a purpose-built studio centre, located in Brunel Way, Carlisle. The complex contained two production studios, a small continuity studio and a film interview studio. These were converted to colour with the station and were expanded and upgraded when demand increased following the launch of Channel 4.

Following the merger of ITV Border's service with that of ITV Tyne Tees, the Border studios were closed and demolished in 2010. A new office was opened in the Kingstown area of Carlisle with a newsroom and sales offices. In 2015 a newsroom and edit suites were opened in Selkirk, where some of the southern Scotland opt-out programmes are produced. Both sites have fibre video and data links to ITV Tyne Tees in Gateshead.

ITV Border maintains a bureau for Scottish Parliament coverage in Edinburgh with district news reporters and camera crews based locally in Dumfries, Galloway, Kendal and Whitehaven. The Edinburgh and Selkirk offices produce the southern Scotland political programme, Representing Border.

== Identity ==
The Border Television logo from 1969 to 1989

The ITV1 generic Border Television logo between 1999 and 2002. ITV was used from 1999 before being changed to ITV1 in 2001.

The TV Border logo from 2006 to 2013

Throughout its history until its rebranding as "ITV Border", Border Television used the same logo, an abstract symbol known affectionately by locals as "the chopsticks". It features a thick shape with a forker line crossing it and running either side of the shape, which divides the area into three parts, representing Scotland above the line, England below it, and the Solway Firth in the small area to the left.

The launch identity was a black caption with the white logo and "Border Television" beneath, over an announcement. The start-up routine was symbolic because of its distinctive and unchanging music and the announcement stating: "This is Border Television, coming to you from the Caldbeck, Selkirk and Richmond Hill transmitters of the Independent Television Authority." and then, "This is Border Television broadcasting to Cumbria, South Scotland, the Isle of Man and North and West Northumberland, from the Caldbeck, Selkirk and associated transmitters of the Independent Broadcasting Authority."

This was replaced when colour came to the region by the same contents, contained within a rectangle on a blue background with a Colour caption outside the box. The colour caption was removed in the 1980s and the announcement said: "This is Border Television providing a full colour service to Cumbria, South Scotland, the Isle of Man and North and West Northumberland, from the Caldbeck, Selkirk and associated transmitters of the Independent Broadcasting Authority."

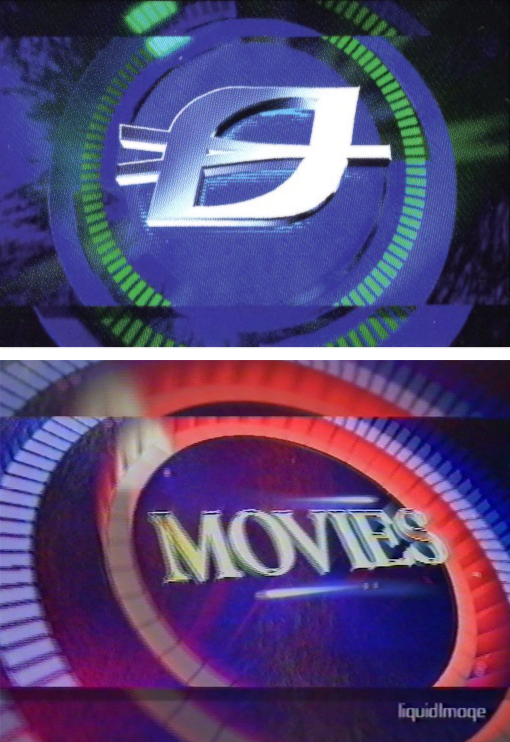
The Logo & movie idents by Liquid Image for Border TV

Border adopted an animated ident on 1 September 1989 when they adopted the ITV Generic look. Their version was mildly well suited, as the contents of the traditional Border logo were recognisable in the "V" segment of the logo. This look was extensively used, even in the news department. Border also began to use in-vision continuity more heavily.

On 5 September 1994, the logo was updated into a 3D version. This ident features a 3D Border logo falling into place against an icy-cold cyan backdrop, which was set to the same as 1989 ITV Generic theme. It remained until 31 August 1995. Border used the same in-vision continuity again.

On 1 September 1995, the logo was changed again with two different idents, a same 3D Border logo falling into place against a water-effect blue backdrop, which was set to the same tune as used previously but later played on instruments to match the water theme. In another one, with the same sequence against a backdrop of spinning discs and blue and purple colours. New music was composed featuring deep basses. The whole effect was to make Border have an authoritative and broadcaster tone. This package remained until 7 November 1999.

On 8 November 1999, Border adopted the second generic look along with the rest of the regions, but did not use their logo in this look. From then on, Border only used network designs for idents. From 28 October 2002, Border idents featuring a celebrity with the ITV1 logo with the word Border underneath were used for local programming only. All other programming used network idents and from 1 November 2004 no regional idents existed. Local productions are now attributed on-screen to 'ITV News and Current Affairs Border' and ITV Border.

== Programmes ==
Children's programmes

- Border Birthdays (1985-2002)

Current programmes

- Border Life (Southern Scotland only)
- ITV News Border
- Around the House (also broadcast on ITV Tyne Tees)
- ITV News Lookaround
- Representing Border (Southern Scotland only)
- Border Sport in Focus (Southern Scotland only)

Past programmes

- The Andy Stewart Show
- APB
- Basil's Joke Machine
- Bliss (1985)
- BMX Beat
- Border Folk
- Border Forum (1970–77)
- Border Greats
- Border Month (1972–79)
- Border Parliamentary Report (1972–78)
- Border Stories (1999–2004)
- Cock of the Border (1960s)
- Coconuts (1990)
- Crush a Grape
- Galloway Ceilidh (1979
- Hindsight (1981–87)
- Homegrown
- Krankies Television/K.T.V.
- Krazy Kitchen
- Law of the Lakes
- Look Who's Talking
- Mr. and Mrs.
- Nature Trail
- Pick a Number (1984–86)
- Revelations (1984–88)
- Scene Shed (1980s)
- Studio One (1976-80s)
- The Joke Machine (1989)
- The Sound of .... (1970–81)
- The Union and the League
- Take the Mick
- Trailblazing
- Try For Ten (1968–84)
- Vegetable Village (1965)
- Way of the Lakes

ITV regional service
New service as Border Television	Isle of Man; 26 March 1965 – 24 February 2009 (on-air brand & franchise); 25 February 2009 – 15 July 2009 (franchise only)	Succeeded by ITV Tyne Tees & Border
New service as Border Television	England/Scotland border 1 September 1961 – 24 February 2009 (on-air brand & franchise); 25 February 2009 – present (franchise only)	Succeeded by ITV Tyne Tees & Border
Preceded by ITV Tyne Tees & Border	England/Scotland border 16 September 2013 – present	Current provider as ITV Border
