= ITV Tyne Tees & Border =

British regional television producer

- Type: Region of a television network
- Branding: ITV1
- Country: England and Scotland
- First air date: 25 February 2009; 16 years ago
- Headquarters: Gateshead
- Area: Tyne Tees: County Durham; Northumberland; North Yorkshire (North); Tyne and Wear; Border: Cumbria (excluding Furness); Dumfries and Galloway; Scottish Borders
- Owner: ITV plc
- Dissolved: 15 September 2013 (as merged region; shared production continues)
- Affiliation: ITV
- Official website: ITV Tyne Tees; ITV Border
- Replaced: ITV Tyne Tees; ITV Border
- Replaced by: ITV Tyne Tees; ITV Border; (shared production from Gateshead continues)

ITV Tyne Tees & Border is the producer of regional programming for the ITV Tyne Tees and ITV Border franchises. Between 2009 and 2013, the two regions were merged into a single region (although still with two franchises). Since 2013, each region receives its own regional service, but both services use the same studios and presenters.

== Overview ==
The news service transmits to a vast area – northern and central Cumbria, County Durham, Dumfries and Galloway, Northumberland, North Yorkshire, the Scottish Borders and Tyne and Wear.

The news services continue to be produced and broadcast from headquarters in Gateshead with reporters also based at bureaux in Billingham, Carlisle, Edinburgh and Selkirk. Additional bureaux were formerly also at the University of Sunderland and York.

== History ==
The dual news service was launched on Wednesday 25 February 2009, shortly after the broadcasting regulator Ofcom gave ITV plc the go-ahead to merge two regions, ITV Tyne Tees and ITV Border.

North East Tonight and Lookaround titles were retained for the 6pm programme and late bulletin each weekday, whilst shorter bulletins were known simply as Tyne Tees & Border News. On 14 January 2013, the "Tyne Tees" news service rebranded as ITV News Tyne Tees with the "Border" news service Lookaround retained. Pan-regional bulletins were then branded as ITV News Tyne Tees & Border while the existing Tyne Tees monthly political programme Around the House now also incorporates the Border region.

The service covered the Isle of Man until Thursday 16 July 2009 when Granada Reports (the ITV Granada region) took over coverage of the Crown dependency.

The news service was selected in November 2009 to be one of the pilot areas for the provision of the new Independently Funded News Consortia proposed by Ofcom, however the plan was scrapped in June 2010.

The amalgamated region was heavily criticised due to a lack of coverage for viewers in the South of Scotland.

On 23 July 2013, proposals to reintroduce full regional services for the Tyne Tees and Border regions were approved by Ofcom, effectively leading to a demerger of the Tyne Tees and Border services. On 16 September 2013, ITV News Tyne Tees and Lookaround were restored as fully separate regional programmes on weekdays with shorter daytime and weekend bulletins reintroduced. Both programmes continue to be broadcast from ITV's Gateshead studios with extra journalists recruited for newsgathering in the Border region. However, production of these programmes is credited on end captions to either "ITV Tyne Tees" or "ITV Border", despite both coming from the same studio.

ITV Border was also required to reopen its former opt-out service for southern Scotland, previously used to broadcast split news bulletins and selected STV programming. A minimum of 90 minutes a week of bespoke Scottish programming is broadcast on ITV Border Scotland with viewers in Cumbria continuing to receive network output. The sub-regional service, launched on 6 January 2014, incorporates a thrice-weekly political programme, Representing Border, on Tuesday - Thursday nights and a peak-time feature series, Border Life, on Monday evenings.

== Programmes ==
- Around the House
- Border Life
- Border Sport in Focus
- ITV News Tyne Tees
- Lookaround
- Representing Border

ITV regional branding
Preceded by ITV Border	Isle of Man; 25 February 2009 – 15 July 2009 on-air branding only	Succeeded by ITV Granada
Preceded by ITV Border	England/Scotland border 25 February 2009 – 15 September 2013 on-air branding only	Succeeded by ITV Border
Preceded by ITV Tyne Tees	North East England; 25 February 2009 – 15 September 2013 on-air branding only	Succeeded by ITV Tyne Tees
