= The One Minutes =

Global platform for video art

The One Minutes is a global network for one-minute experimental videos.

== History ==
The One Minutes was initiated in 1998 by Katja van Stiphout and Michal Buttink, two students of the Sandberg Institute, Masters of Art and Design in Amsterdam. The institute was asked to fill an hour of airtime on local television, Salto (Television), once a month from midnight to 1 a.m. They invited fellow students and friends to fill the timeslot with one-minute films. Its duration — shorter than a music video, slightly longer than a commercial — became engines of innovation. What began as a late-night television slot grew into a worldwide platform, where television channels, arts organisations and film festivals adopted and showcased One Minutes across the globe.

In 1999, The One Minutes Foundation was formally established under the direction of Jos Houweling and with the support of Sandberg Institute. Since then, The One Minutes Awards have been held annually to acknowledge the best One Minutes of the year. The One Minutes held their first international workshop in China in 2000 at Xiamen University, marking the beginning of an ongoing commitment to cultural exchange between international and Chinese artists, filmmakers and students. In 2008, Chinese artists took part in the Venice Biennale as part of The One Minutes. Since 2009, East China Normal University and Shanghai Dragon TV have organised the yearly One Minutes International Competition, broadcast by Dragon TV, Shanghai Media Group's satellite broadcaster. One Minutes were also shown at EXPO Shanghai in 2010, and since 2011, The One Minutes has been a returning section of the annual Shanghai International Film Festival.

=== Core values ===
The One Minutes provides a place for artists and filmmakers within the intersection of art and film. Within the one minute video format, a maker can experiment and express themselves through moving image.

== Collection ==
In 2012, The One Minutes Collection and the Netherlands Institute for Sound and Vision in collaboration with BMW Group Netherlands, started to digitalize the collection. The goal was to the collection available for future generations.

Since 2020, The One Minutes Collection is published on the search portal for the general public (GPP), the search portal for media professionals (MPP), the Education Platform (OMP) and the Clariah Mediasuite, a portal for researchers at the Netherlands Institute for Sound and Vision. Licensing and reuse are handled by The One Minutes. Publication requests for television are processed by The Netherlands Institute for Sound and Vision. The collection includes over 17.000 one-minute videos from around 120 countries and has grown to include a diverse selection of video art.

== Workshops ==
Workshops are organised by The One Minutes in collaboration with the Sandberg Institute and other art education programmes. The One Minutes also organizes workshops for asylum seekers and youngsters under The One Minutes Jr. In such workshops, artists collaborate with students, amateurs and children.

Workshops for The One Minutes included 'Mind-body-problem', a collaboration with Maastricht Institute of Arts in the summer of 2021. 'Mind-body-problem' is curated by Sander Breure and Witte van Hulzen to depict the relation between the soul and the body.

Workshops for The One Minutes Jr. take place over the course of five days, where video artists teach basic camera and directing skills as well as creative thinking and story-telling. Each participant develops their own One Minute which is screened at the end of the workshop.

== The One Minute Series ==
The One Minutes releases a new series of one-minute films every two months. These series explore current times through moving images. Guest curators are invited to conceive and curate a series. They send out an open call for submissions and also utilize The One Minutes Collection to compile the series.

The One Minutes Series were exhibited amongst others at Art Museum of Nanjing University of the Arts (CN), De Pont Museum of Contemporary Art (NL), Power Station of Art (CN), National Gallery of Iceland (IS) and Whitney Museum of American Art (USA) and screened at amongst others Durban International Film Festival, International Documentary Film Festival Amsterdam, International Short Film Festival Oberhausen, and Reykjavík International Film Festival.

=== Highlighted Series ===
==== 'Imagine The Earth Is Your Lover' ====
'Imagine The Earth Is Your Lover' (2020) is curated by Annie Sprinkle and Beth Stephens. The series documents the ecosex movement through one minutes by 23 artists and filmmakers. The series transforms 'Earth as Mother' to 'Earth as Lover' and showcases a mutual, sustainable relationship between filmmakers and the Earth.

'Imagine The Earth Is Your Lover' premiered in September 2020 at Reykjavík International Film Festival. The series premiered online in October 2020 at Het Nieuwe Instituut. Other screenings involve Performance Space New York and the Franconia Sculpture Park.

==== 'Ways of Something' ====
'Ways of Something' (2014) is a series curated by Lorna Mills consisting of four episodes. Episode one and two were produced by The One Minutes, episode three and four were produced by Lorna Mills. The series is a contemporary remake of the BBC documentary 'Ways of Seeing', made in 1972 by John Berger.

Within the videos, a combination of formal, figural and kitsch practices are featured. 'Ways of Something' shows diverse interpretations of Berger's manner of looking at art after the introduction of the internet and digital media. The episodes together contain One Minutes from 113 network-based artists. These artists are working in 3D rendering, film remix, gifs, websites and webcam performances to explore art making after the introduction of the internet.

The episodes were debuted at TRANSFER Gallery in New York in September 2014. 'Ways of Something' was on view and subsequently included in the collection of Whitney Museum of American Art in 2016.

==== 'The One Minutes Jr. Ukraine' ====
'The One Minutes Jr. Ukraine' was produced in 2022, at the request of International Short Film Festival Oberhausen. A compilation of 46 One Minutes produced in Ukraine with The One Minutes Jr. was made, which premiered at the festival. The series premiered online at Het Nieuwe Instituut and toured filmfestivals throughout 2022.

== The One Minutes Jr. ==
In 2002, The One Minutes Jr. was initiated by The One Minutes Foundation, European Cultural Foundation and UNICEF, to support social change, organising workshops for youngsters all over the world. In 2015 alone, they travelled to Albania, Azerbaijan, Cambodia, Kyrgyzstan, Myanmar, The Philippines, South Sudan and Ukraine.The One Minutes Jr. is a project of The One Minutes established with the European Cultural Foundation in 2002. The One Minutes Jr. collaborates with youth from ages 12 and up, from all over the world through video workshops. Since 2002, nearly 4.000 youngsters have participated from over 100 countries.

The One Minutes Jr. videos are promoted amongst broadcasters and films are screened at exhibition venues, film festivals, art fairs, cinemas, galleries, art websites and museums. Distributors include the BBC, EYE Film Institute, W139, NRK and NOS Jeugdjournaal.

Each year, The One Minutes Jr. Award is presented. Fifteen nominees from around the world are invited to the Netherlands to attend the award ceremony, where three winners are awarded a Tommy award.

In 2016 and 2017, The One Minutes Jr. travelled to Ukraine to give workshops in Avdiivka, Bakhmut, Dobropillia, Kharkiv, Liman, Mariupol, Melitopol, Sievierodonetsk, Sloviansk and Volnovakha. The workshops explored the influence of war on daily life in Ukraine, as well as the fears and dreams of Ukrainian youth. In 2022, with the Russian invasion of Ukraine the relevance of the series was prominent. A compilation of 46 One Minutes titled 'The One Minutes Jr. Ukraine' was published in a series.

In 2023, The One Minutes Jr. worked with Rohingya refugees in refugee camps in Cox's Bazar, Bangladesh.

== Exhibitions and Screenings ==
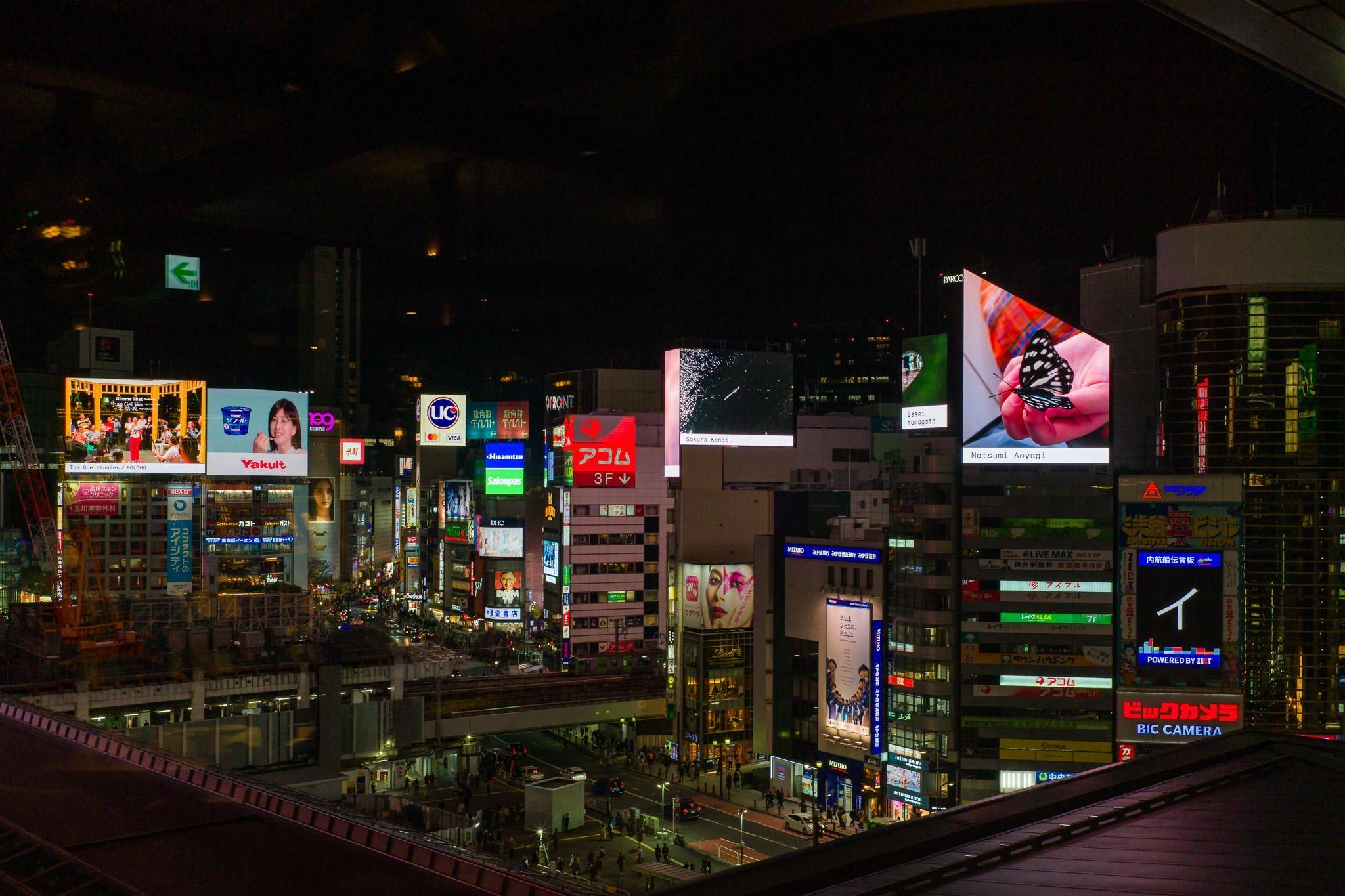
The One Minutes at Shibuya Crossing in Tokyo for EASTEAST

=== EAST EAST Tokyo ===
For EAST EAST Tokyo, 2023, The One Minutes projected videos on eight screens on Shibuya Crossing. The series 'The BOLOHO Series' curated by the BOLOHO Collective and 'REST HARD: an act of doing nothing in a safe company' curated by Party Office were shown.

=== Video Club X The One Minutes ===
In 2019 at the Stedelijk Museum Amsterdam, the sixth edition of Video Club was presented by The One Minutes in collaboration with guest-curator Harm van den Dorpel. Here, the series 'Artificial Scarcity' was presented alongside a selection of video art from the collection of the Stedelijk Museum.

=== 'How To’ ===
‘How To’, conceived by Hars Aarsman in 2014, is a compilation of short films that deal with convenient tips. The one-minutes featured teach the viewer something: from tying shoe laces with one hand to separating egg yolk and white. One Minutes from 'How To' were shown at Museum De Pont between May and August 2014.

=== The One Minutes on Tour - Shanghai ===
From June 11 to July 13, 2014, Power Station of Art exhibited The One Minutes on Tour - Shanghai / 一 分钟影像世纪巡回展(上海首展). The exhibition focused on the perception of the moving image and celebrated The One Minutes’ 15-year anniversary. The exhibition featured eleven screens showing over 300 one-minute videos. The exhibition was accompanied by a printed catalog.

== Extended List of Series ==
- 'Untitled' curated by ikkibawiKrrr (2023)
- 'REST HARD: an act of doing nothing in a safe company' curated by Party Office (2023)
- 'The BOLOHO Series' curated by The BOLOHO Collective (2022)
- 'Squeeze Crush Press Blush' curated by Afra Eisma and Marnix van Uum (2022)
- 'The One Minutes Jr. Ukraine' (2022)
- 'Snack or Food Pill?' curated by Sandberg Design Department (2022)
- 'Akwatik' curated by Kinemastik (2021)
- 'Forked Tongue' curated by Madison Bycroft (2021)
- 'Akarani Bono Awowa' curated by Manuwi C Tokai (Caitlin Schaap) (2021)
- 'Mind-body-problem' curated by Sander Breure and Witte van Hulzen (2021)
- 'The Fields of Algorithms' curated by David Blandy (2021)
- 'Comfort and Vision' curated by Salim Bayri (2021)
- 'Imagine The Earth is Your Lover' curated by Annie Sprinkle and Beth Stephens (2020)
- 'New Normalism' curated by Arnoud Holleman (2020)
- 'The power of transparency' curated by Minhong Yu (2020)
- 'Healing Tool' curated by Shana Moulton (2020)
- 'so real, so very now' curated by Misha de Ridder (2020)
- 'Everything happened so much: archive as poem in an age of perpetual witnessing' curated by Jesse Darling (2020)
- 'Witches' curated by Julliette Lizotte (2020)
- 'PAW' curated by Ceel Mogami de Haas (2020)
- 'Real Sur Real' curated by Jerszy Seymour (2019)
- 'Artificial Scarcity' curated by Harm van den Dorpel (2019)
- '旧写真 Old Images' curated by Tao Hui (2019)
- 'Visions from Shadow Channel' curated by Kate Cooper (2019)
- 'ZOOMSCAPE' curated by Sofia Mourato (2019)
- 'Martians Send Videos Home' curated by Joseph Popper (2019)
- 'Nominees The One Minutes Jr. Awards 2018' (2018)
- '刹那即永恒 - One Minute is Eternal' (2018)
- 'Nøtel Cinema' curated by Lawrence Lek (2018)
- 'Liminal Express' curated by Kubilay Mert Ural (2018)
- 'Prism of Freedom' curated by Va-Bene E. Fiatsi (crazinisT artisT) (2018)
- 'Islas Inútiles' curated by Bar None (2018)
- 'Our Soul Isn't A Border' curated by Salomé Lamas (2018)
- 'The Human Puppet' curated by David Henry Nobody Jr (2018)
- 'Biased Gods' curated by Janna Ullrich (2018)
- 'Public Justice' curated by Quinsy Gario (2018)
- 'Create Characters' curated by Egill Sæbjörnsson (2017)
- 'Synthetic Selves' curated by Goys & Birls (2017)
- ‘The Sandberg Series 2017’ (2017)
- 'Nominees The One Minutes Jr. Awards 2017' (2017)
- 'Dreaming the Dark: hands that see, eyes that touch' curated by Ana Vaz (2017)
- 'Intimate Technology' curated by Next Nature Network (2017)
- 'Enjoy your file, download your life' curated by Studio David Claerbout (2017)
- 'Micro-Composition' curated by Cally Spooner (2017)
- ‘Nightmares Of The Sun’ curated by Khavn (2017)
- 'MAKE BEING RADICAL AGAIN' curated by Tereza Ruller (2017)
- ‘The Pack – Impressions from Our Family’ curated by Felix Burger (2017)
- ‘Designing The One Minute’ curated by Yin Aiwen (2017)
- ‘Promise of Suspense’ curated by Superposition (2017)
- 'No Humans - No Animals - No Sound' curated by Melvin Moti (2016)
- 'Making Hybrids' curated by Janis Rafa (2016)
- 'Nominees The One Minutes Jr. Awards 2016' (2016)
- 'The Sandberg Series 2016' (2016)
- 'YES SCREAMING NO' collected by Cécile B. Evans (2016)
- 'ECO VS EGO – Healing Videos' curated by Pinar&Viola (2016)
- 'IN.NO.SENSE' curated by Xue Mu (2016)
- 'World at a Crossroads – Open Call, Wake Up Call' curated by Libia Castro & Ólafur Ólafsson (2016)
- 'Dark Football' curated by Xander Karskens (2016)
- 'Colón: ¿Culo o Conquista?' curated by Dick Verdult / Dick El Demasiado (2016)
- 'Communication with the Non-Human' curated by Melanie Bonajo (2016)
- 'we do the voodoo - play on continuity and rhythm from one artist to another' initiated by Helen Dowling (2016)
- 'The Sandberg Series 2015' (2015)
- 'Nominees The One Minutes Jr. Awards 2015' (2015)
- ‘Nyau Cinema’ curated by Samson Kambalu (2015)
- '49' (2015)
- 'Tell me your dream. Make it succinct and make it spectacular.’ curated by Claire Hooper and Paul Simon Richards (2015)
- ‘One Minute Activist!’ curated by Nienke Eijsink (2015)
- ‘We do not know what it is exactly that you are doing, but does this make any sense?’ curated by Faivovich & Goldber (2015)
- ‘But her eyes said that gunshot knew he had a creation, and that was why parrot was wise of bulk’ selected by Jens Maier-Rothe (2015)
- ‘بعد الربيع العربي After the Arab Spring’ curated by Yassine El Idrissi (2015)
- ‘Mega Armageddon Death - Long Version’ curated by Nathaniel Mellors (2015)
- 'They have come to escort me on the dangerous pathway of the intermediate state' curated by J&K / Janne Schäfer and Kristine Agergaard (2014)
- 'Nothing thicker than a knife's blade separates happiness from melancholy' curated by k.i. beyoncé (2014)
- 'Ways of Something Episode 2' compiled by Lorna Mills (2014)
- 'Happy' (December 2014)
- 'Videos Without Ideas' curated by Erkka Nissinen (2014)
- 'Deep Blue' curated by Arnar Ásgeirsson (2014)
- 'Color' (2014)
- 'Animation' (2014)
- 'How To' curated by Hans Aarsman (2014)
- 'Ways of Something Episode 1' compiled by Lorna Mills (2014)

== Useful links ==
- https://theoneminutes.org/
- https://www.theoneminutesjr.org/
