= Aphra: The Feminist Literary Magazine =

APHRA: the feminist literary magazine
- Discipline: Feminist Theory
- Language: English
- Edited by: Elizabeth Fisher

Publication details
- History: 1969-1976
- Publisher: APHRA, Inc. (USA)
- Frequency: Quarterly

Standard abbreviations
- ISO 4: aphra

Indexing
- ISSN: 2381-0513

Published from 1969 to 1976 in New York City, Aphra: The Feminist Literary Magazine was a quarterly feminist serial, one of the first of its kind. The mission was to develop a platform for women's expression in response to a male dominated literary market. The title Aphra came from Aphra Behn (1640–1689), the first woman to make a living as a writer.

The periodical published work from notable feminist authors such as Margaret Atwood, Kate Millet and Alice Walker, providing contemporary and historical social critique through the lens of second-wave feminist theory.

== Mission statement ==
“Free women thinking, doing, being.”

== Mandate and editorial content ==
Content followed a general theme from issue to issue, with special issues focusing on more specific topics such as the Spring, 1971 The Whore Issue, from volume 2 number 2, a controversial publication at the time.

In addition to short fiction, poetry, art, play excerpts, essays and other writing, was content unique to Aphra. Featuring critique and exposes on the downsides of the women's movement from a feminist perspective, Aphra provided meta-commentary on the second-wave feminist movement itself, offering perspectives that were not present in other radical feminist publications.

== Contributors ==
Art

Beth Bird, Isabel Bishop, Maude Boltz, Louise Bourgeois, Irene Fertik, Leonor Fini, Myrna Greenfield, Françoise Grossen, Susan Hall, Anne Healy, Eva Hesse, Katarzyna Kobro, Kaethe Kollwitz, Marisol, Rosemary Mayer, Kate Millett, Louise Nevelson, Dianora Niccolini, Mariette Ollier, Susan Schwalb, Gail Singer, Patricia Sloane, Nancy Spero, Charlotte Jane Whitehall, Hannah Wilke

Biography

Ellen Glasgow

Drama

Marjorie De Fazio, Elizabeth Fisher, Nora Harlow, Myrna Lamb, Vivien Leone, Dacia Maraini, Jane Mayhall, Andrew Piotrowski, Dolores Walker, Claire Woock

Essays and Criticism

Margaret Atwood, Sylvia Robinson Corrigan, Elizabeth Fisher, Dorothy Hage, Ellen Harold, Carolyn Heilbrun, Terri Hinte, Colette Inez, Carolyn Kizer, Lolette Kuby, Vivien Leone, Juli Loesch, Marion Meade, Eve Merriam, Casey Miller, Sylvia H. Myers, Mary Nelson, Esther Newton, Daphne Patai, Rachel Phillips, Mary Beth Ross, Alice S. Rossi, Muriel Rukeyser, Gerry Sachs, Therese Schwartz, Alix Kates Shulman, Ann Snitow, Kimberley H.M.S. Snow, Karen F. Stein, Janet Sternberg, Kate Swift, Jill Tweedie, Anne Waldman, Paula Webster, Leah Zahler

Fiction

Concha Alos, Corrado Alvaro, Ascher/Strauss, Jane Augustine, Sheila Ballantyne, Mildred Barker, Anita Barrows, Sylvia Berkman, Ravelle Brickman, Phyllis Chesler, Kate Chopin, S. D., Sasha Davis, Elizabeth Fisher, H. E. Francis, Veronica Geng, Adele Glimm, Cynthia D. Grant, Susan Griffin, Renny Hartmann, Diane Hatcher, Josephine Herbst, Eleanor Hyde, Rosemary Ingham, Nelly Kaplan, Ellen Killoh, Joann Kobin, Edith Konecky, Catherine Lade, E. Lagomarsino, Margaret Lamb, Vivien Leone, Rikki Lights, Gin Manthei, Jane Mayhall, Isabel Miller, Shannon Murphy, Helen Neville, Irini Nova, Tillie Olsen, Carolyn Osborn, Daphne Patai, Marge Piercy, Lydia Ressner, Margaret Robinson, Nancy Robbin, Frances Rominski, Naomi Rothberg, Mary Rouse, Lynne Sharon Schwartz, Mary Seiler, Alix Kates Shulman, Joan Silber, Linda Sitea, Pat Staten, Catharine Stimpson, Elaine Sulka, Grace Wade, Mimi Weissman

Poetry

Adele Aldridge, Judith Alexander, Jody Aliesan, Alta, Margaret Atwood, Jane Augustine, Anita Barrows, Robin Becker, Carol Berge, Janet Brof, Rita Mae Brown, Rosellen Brown, Barbara Chesser, Laura Chester, Michele Clark, Marilyn Coffey, Martha Collins, Jane Cooper, Beth Copeland, Sylvia R. Corrigan, Sheila Delaney, Crescent Dragonwagon, Rachel Du Plessis, Kathleen Ernst, Susan Fawcett, Siv Cedering Fox, Pat Therese Frances, Celestine Frost, Jean Garrigue, Patricia Giggans, Celia Gilbert, Emilie Glen, Harriet Goldhor, Miriam Goodman, Barbara Gravelle, Alexandra Grilikhes, Marilyn Hacker, Joan Joffe Hall, Patricia Hampl, Barbara Harr, Ruth Herschberger, Dorothy Hughes, J. Humphrey, Ruth Ikeler, Colette Inez, Frances Jaffer, Francesca Jenkins, Erica Jong, Lyn Kelly, Gerrye Kessel, Virginia Kidd, Wendy Knox, M. J. Lallo, Joan Larkin, Naomi Lazard, Diana Levenberg, Lyn Lifshin, Harriet Lerner, Carol Lopate, Audre Lorde, Judith McCombs, Rosemary McDermott, Irene McKinney, Erica Mann, Kathryn Martin, Jane Mayhall, Carolyn Miller, Estelle Milligan, Helena Minton, Anne Moody, Adeline Naiman, Helen Neville, Paula Novotnak, Nina Nyhart, Carol O’Connor, Joyce Odam, Ariana Olisvos, Miriam Palmer, Gerrye Payne, Marge Piercy, Naomi Rachel, Rebecca Radner, Adrienne Rich, Susan Scibetta
