= Afra (name) =

Female given name of Turkish origin

Afra is a feminine given name of Turkish origin. It means the 13th of the month and untrodden ground. It is derived from the Arabic word "afrâ" (عَفْرَاء). It could also mean maple in Persian (افرا). Notable people with the name include:

== Given names ==
- Afra (beatboxer) (born 1980), Japanese beatboxer
- Afra Atiq, Emirati spoken word poet
- Afra Bukhari (1938–2022), Pakistani writer
- Afra Eisma (born 1993), Dutch artist
- Afra Saraçoğlu (born 1997), Turkish actress and model
- Afra Scarpa (1937–2011), Italian architect
- Saint Afra (died 304), German Christian martyr

== Fictional characters ==
- Afra Lyon, character in the 1990 novel The Rowan

== See also ==
- Afra (disambiguation)
- Aphra
