= Murder of Lindsay Rimer =

1994 British unsolved murder

- Date: c. 7–8 November 1994
- Location: Hebden Bridge, West Yorkshire
- Cause: Strangulation

Lindsay Jo Rimer (17 February 1981 – c. 7 November 1994) was a 13-year-old British girl from Hebden Bridge, West Yorkshire who disappeared on the evening of 7 November 1994. The following year, her body was found in the Rochdale Canal outside the town; she had been strangled.

Despite repeated appeals for information, her murder remains unsolved. Police investigated criminals such as the murderer John Taylor, but no evidence has been found to link them to Rimer's murder. In 2016, West Yorkshire Police announced that they had isolated a DNA profile that they would attempt to develop further. In October 2025, a man was arrested on suspicion of her murder.

== Life ==
Lindsay Jo Rimer (born 17 February 1981) lived with her parents, two sisters, and brother in the family home on Cambridge Street in Hebden Bridge. She was in Year 9 at Calder High School and was described as a popular pupil.

== Disappearance ==
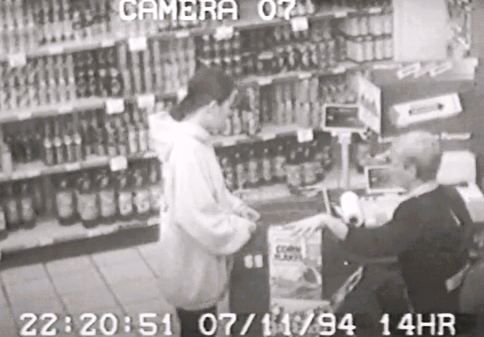
CCTV footage of Rimer, pictured shortly before her final confirmed sighting

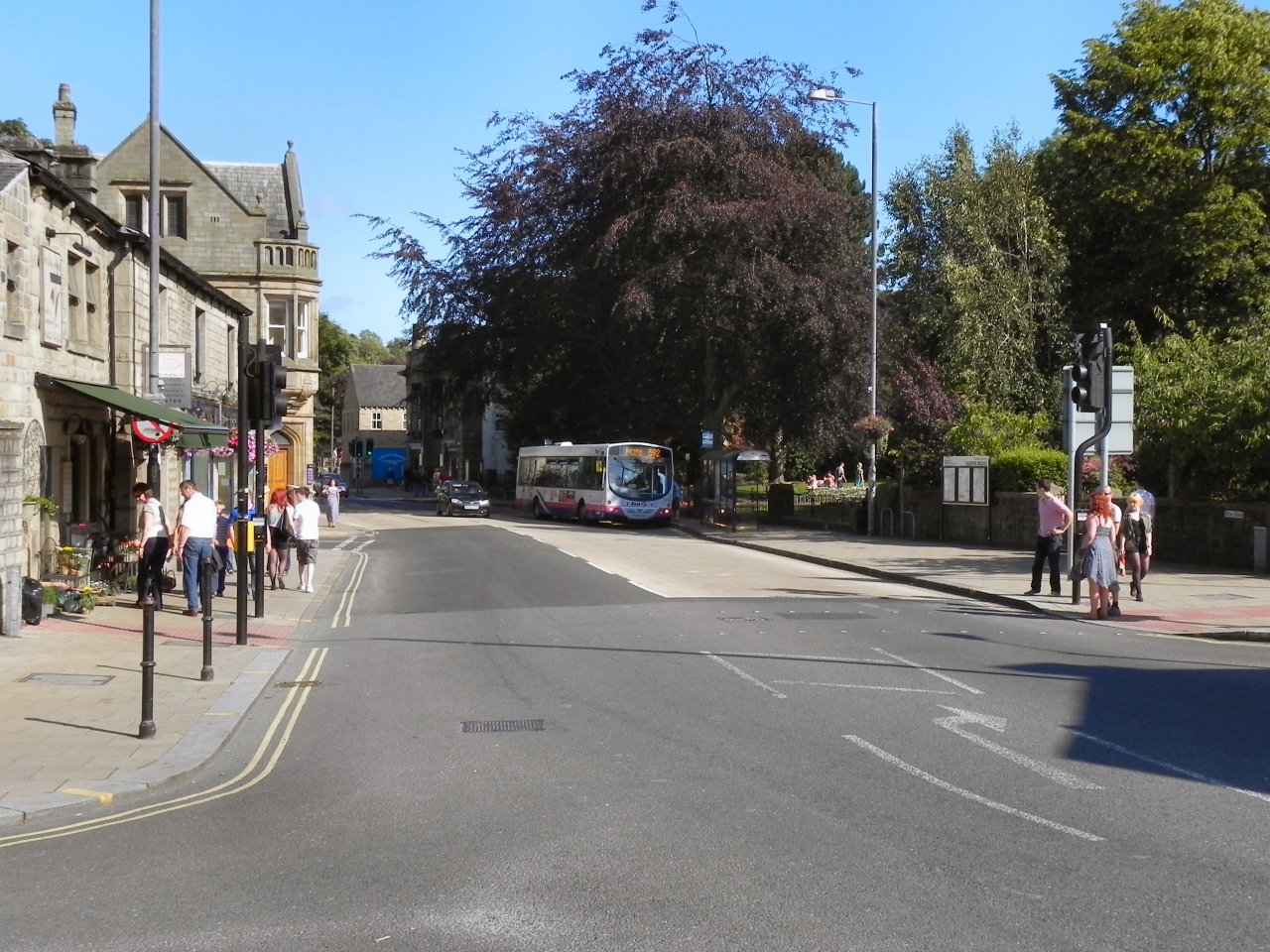
The final confirmed sighting of Rimer was of her leaning against a wall by the bus stop at the end of Crown Street, about twenty minutes after she left the SPAR

Rimer was last seen alive on the evening of 7 November 1994. At about 10:00 p.m. GMT, she left her home to buy a packet of cornflakes from the SPAR supermarket in Crown Street. On her way to the shop, she briefly visited a local pub, the Trades Club in Holme Street, where her mother was having a drink with a friend. Her mother asked Rimer if she wanted to stay and have a cola with them, but Lindsay declined and continued to the shop, having asked her mother for money to buy the cornflakes. CCTV footage exists from the shop showing her paying for the cornflakes at 10:22 p.m. She failed to return home that night, although as her mother was out and her father had been on the phone between 9:45 and 10:20 p.m., neither noticed and thought she had come home and gone straight to her attic bedroom for the night. Rimer was last seen at 10:40 p.m. on Crown Street by the entrance to the Memorial Garden, leaning against a wall.

When Rimer did not appear for her paper round the following morning the newsagents rang home and her paper delivery bag was found to still be in the kitchen along with her school money. At this point, it became clear she had not slept in her bed and the alarm was raised.

Police initially suspected that Rimer might have been a runaway. There was local speculation that Rimer had been having problems at home, although this was denied by her family. Rimer's older sister Katie took part in a reconstruction of Rimer's walk to the shop and hundreds of local people joined the police in searches of the area around Hebden Bridge, but no trace of Rimer was found. Parts of the Rochdale Canal and River Calder along her route home were also searched. The home of every man in the town was also searched by police.

== Discovery of body ==
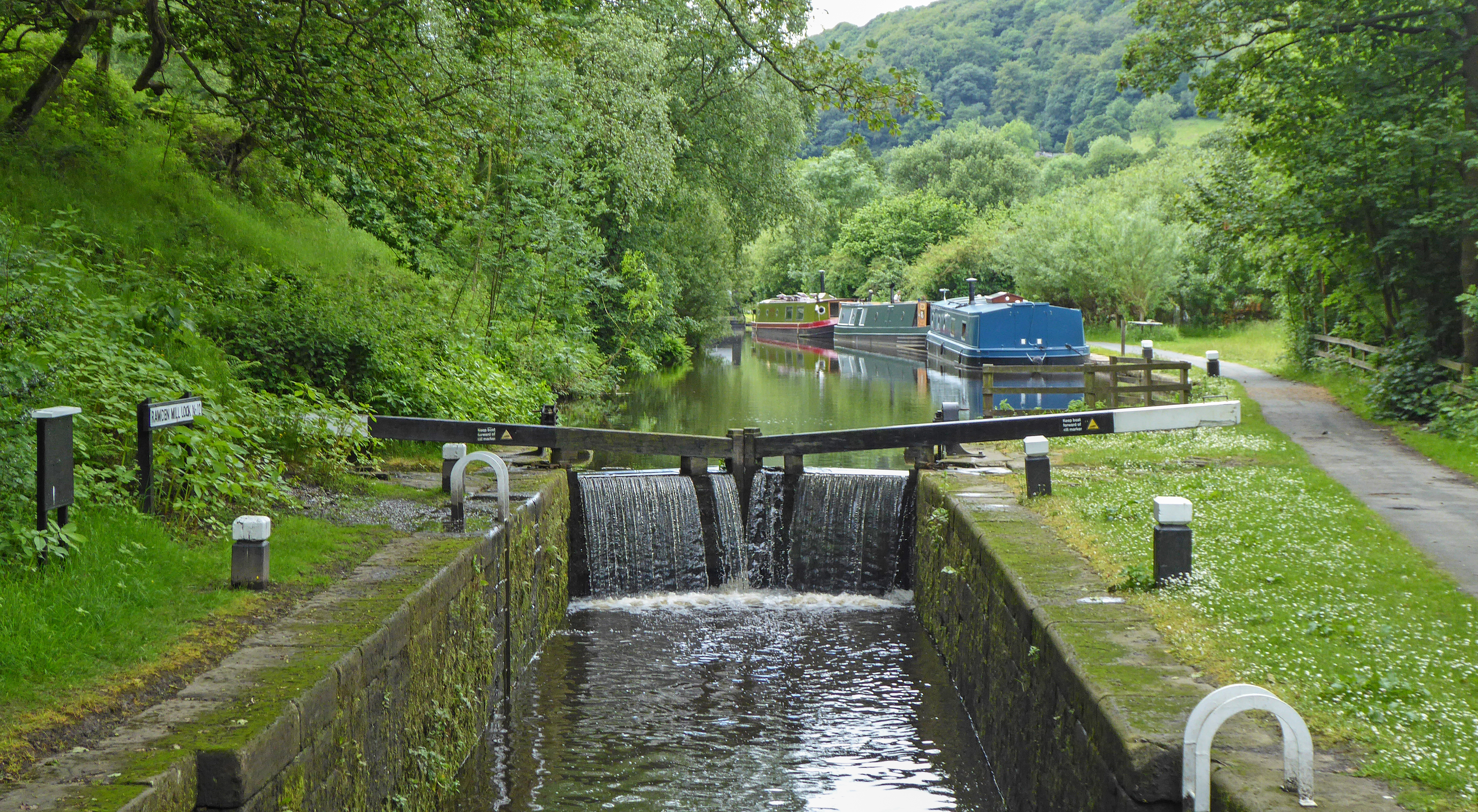
Rimer's body was found at Rawden Mill Lock on the Rochdale Canal

On 12 April 1995 Rimer's body was found by two canal workers in the Rochdale Canal at Rawden Mill Lock, about one mile (1.6 km) from the centre of Hebden Bridge. It had been weighted down with a concrete boulder to prevent it from floating to the surface, and had probably been dislodged during dredging operations in the canal over the preceding days. She was found fully dressed in the clothes that she was wearing when she had disappeared, and in her pocket was still the exact change from the cornflakes she bought that night. The arms of her jumper had been tied together in a sling. The part of the canal in which Rimer was found was next to a well-lit factory (now demolished and a storage site); police believe that the killer had local knowledge of the factory's lack of night-time security.

Police had previously searched parts of the canal, but confirmed after the discovery that they had not searched the section where she was found. Detectives admitted this had been a mistake and said that they should have searched upstream instead, in part because currents in the canal could have taken Rimer's body upstream from Hebden Bridge toward where she was found. However, detectives would later clarify that they believed that Rimer's body had been placed into the section of the canal by the factory. The 20-pound (9.1 kg) stone that had been used to anchor the body was also found to have come from the side of the canal.

The post mortem was conducted later that day at Royal Halifax Infirmary by Home Office pathologist Mike Green, who concluded that Rimer had most likely been strangled to death. Her larynx had been flattened against the spinal column and there were also signs of congestion across the middle of the neck muscles. (Note: A congested muscle is one that has been inflated by having been contracted.) There were no signs of a sexual assault, and Green concluded that the attack had not been of a sexual nature.

== Investigations ==
1 Rimer's home
2 Trades Club
3 SPAR shop
4 Location body found (1995)

Detectives believed that Rimer was killed on the night of her disappearance and her body placed in the canal hours before she was reported missing on the morning of 8 November. They also believed that she had likely been killed by someone whom she had known. She was described as a "cautious" girl who would only enter the vehicle of someone whom she trusted. The fact that there had been no sightings of a struggle or her being dragged into a vehicle made investigators believe that she had got into a vehicle with someone known to her, such as someone she had met recently or an older brother of a friend.

An offender profile was drawn up by a psychiatrist, and this concluded that the killer would likely be someone who could drive, probably aged 17 to their early 20s, and potentially someone Rimer would be attracted to. Lead investigator Tony Whittle suggested that the killer may not have intended to murder Lindsay, saying: "Possibly someone she knew very well offered her a lift. Unbeknown to her he could have been sexually attracted to her, took her to the factory and when she struggled and screamed, perhaps he killed her by mistake."

The canal in which her body was located runs close to the street where the Rimer family lived, and police believed that Rimer may have walked home along an unlit path that runs a few yards from her house.

After Rimer's disappearance, police had discovered that a red Honda Civic stolen in Meanwood, near Leeds, the previous night had been spotted several times in Hebden Bridge near where she had last been seen. The car was seen again in the town during the evening on 12 November. Police attempted to trace the vehicle and the driver, who was described as a bearded male. The man further raised suspicions after it was discovered that he had tried to chat with several teenage girls in the town around the time when Rimer had vanished, and some of the girls were Rimer's school friends. However, several weeks into the investigation the vehicle and driver were traced and the man was ruled out as a suspect due to having a confirmed alibi, since he was being spoken to by a police officer some miles away at the time of Rimer's disappearance.

Two months after Rimer's body was found, police released pictures of shoppers filmed by CCTV at the SPAR shop on the evening of the disappearance. A number of the shoppers had not been traced, and police appealed to the shoppers to present themselves because they may have held important information.

A year after Rimer's disappearance, it was theorised by detectives that Rimer could have met her killer only days before she disappeared at the Hebden Bridge bonfire on 5 November 1994. Police appealed for anyone with any relevant information to speak with them.

== Later inquiries ==
In the late 1990s, Rimer's murder was investigated as part of Operation Enigma, a national cross-force police operation assembled to review the unsolved murders of 207 women across Britain. One of its aims was to examine possible links among murders and examine whether unidentified serial killers could be at large. However, Enigma eliminated the possibility of links between Rimer's murder and other killings.

In 2000, forensic psychologist Richard Badcock told police that the killing may have had a sexual element. He asserted that Rimer may have been killed after she rebuffed the killer's sexual advances, and also claimed that she was killed close to where her body was discovered.

In the years since the discovery of Rimer's body, police have taken hundreds of witness statements and spoken to more than 5,000 people. More than 1,200 vehicles were examined in the first year of the investigation. Detectives have investigated a number of criminals free at the time of the murder; John Taylor (jailed for life in 2002 for the murder of Leanne Tiernan) and John Oswin (jailed for life in 1998 for two rapes) have been investigated, but no evidence has been found to link either to Rimer's murder.

In April 2016, West Yorkshire Police said that a DNA profile had been obtained by a team of forensic specialists. The police hoped that it would identify the killer, saying that they were “really interested in developing further" the DNA profile. It was noted that police did not disclose where the DNA had been found.

On 8 November 2016, a 63-year-old man from Bradford was arrested on suspicion of the murder, but he was later released on police bail. A second suspect, aged 68, was arrested by West Yorkshire Police on suspicion of murder on 25 April 2017 in Bradford.

Speaking on Channel 4 News on the 30th anniversary of Rimer's murder in 2024, new lead detective James Entwistle said that there was a "distinct possibility" that the killer was one of the people already known to investigators and that police may already have spoken to the killer.

On 13 October 2025, police arrested a man on suspicion of Rimer's murder. The suspect was arrested at a prison where he is serving a sentence for other offences.

=== Theories ===
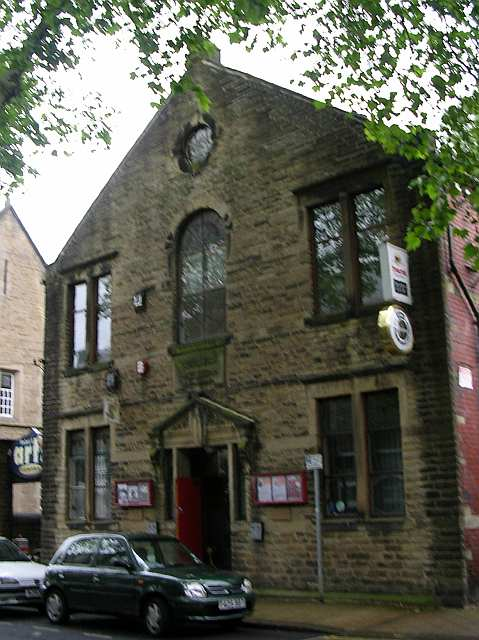
The Trades Club on Holme Street, where Rimer visited minutes before her disappearance

In 2003, it was reported that detectives were investigating a possible link to double murderer Tony King and that they had sought a copy of his DNA. However, police stated to the press that any suggestion that King was linked to Rimer's killing was pure speculation.

In 2007, crime writer Wensley Clarkson published a book titled The Predator: Portrait of a Serial Killer claiming that Francisco Arce Montes, responsible for the highly publicised murder of Caroline Dickinson, was Rimer's killer. Dickinson was a 13-year-old British schoolgirl who was killed by Montes as she slept in a hostel during a class visit to France. Clarkson said that Montes had been visiting York while working as a waiter at a London hotel and was on a hunting trip in Yorkshire on 7 November 1994 when he likely abducted and murdered Rimer that night in a sexually motivated killing, as his preference was to target girls between ages 12 and 14. However, Rimer's mother was "highly sceptical" of the claims. Clarkson claimed that information that Montes may have been responsible originated from a retired police officer, but Clarkson refused to disclose the officer's name or department and was unable to confirm whether evidence existed showing that Montes was in Hebden Bridge on the day of the disappearance. West Yorkshire Police said they would seek to establish the factual basis of the book's claims.

In 2017, retired detective sergeant John Matthews from Cleveland Police stated that a man whom he had questioned in connection with the murders of Tina Bell and Julie Hogg had connections to Hebden Bridge and the Rimer family. He suggested that the man, who died in 2005, should have been considered as a suspect in Rimer's murder. The man had moved to Hebden Bridge in 1990 and worked at the Trades Club.

== In popular culture ==
On 20 March 1995, shortly before Rimer's body was found, a documentary about the investigation was aired as the first episode of the Channel 4 series Deadline. The documentary followed journalists at Yorkshire Television's local news service Calendar, and included interviews with Rimer's parents and the reconstruction of Rimer's last trip to the SPAR shop. The role of Rimer was played by her sister.

Rimer's disappearance was the inspiration for the 1996 play Eclipse, which was the first play written by Simon Armitage. Part of its storyline concerns children obsessed with ritual, magic and superstition, which Armitage thought reflected the character of the community in Hebden Bridge.

In January 2023, the Rimer case was discussed in an episode of David Wilson's Channel 4 series In the Footsteps of Killers, which focused on the murder of Tina Bell. John Matthews from Cleveland Police was interviewed and he discussed his theory on a connection between the Tina Bell and Lindsay Rimer cases and his belief that Vince Robson, who died in 2005, was responsible for Rimer's murder. He said that he reported his concerns to West Yorkshire Police at the time, but heard nothing more.

In October 2024, an appeal for information on the Rimer case was made on Crimewatch Live. The 30-year anniversary appeals also featured in the national news, including on broadcasts of Channel 4 News and Sky News.

== See also ==
- List of solved missing person cases: 1950–1999
- List of unsolved murders in the United Kingdom
- Disappearance of Suzy Lamplugh
- Murder of Vera Holland – similar 1996 UK unsolved case

== Bibliography ==
- Armitage, Simon (2016). Connections 500: Blackout; Eclipse; What Are They Like?; Bassett; I'm Spilling My Heart Out Here; Gargantua; Children of Killers; Take Away; It Snows; The Musicians; Citizenship; Bedbug. London: Bloomsbury Publishing. ISBN 9781474284134.
- Clark, Chris; Trueman, Bethan (2021). "Chapter Ten: 'The Midlands Murders'". The New Millennium Serial Killer. Wakefield: Crime Publishing Network. pp. 160–178. ISBN 978-1-8384861-0-5.
- Clarkson, Wensley (2007). "Chapter 7" (Online copy). The Predator: Portrait of a Global Serial Killer. London: John Blake. pp. 51–55. ISBN 978-1-84454-290-1.
- Welch, Claire (2012). "Lindsay Jo Rimer". Unsolved Crimes: From the Case Files of The People and Daily Mirror. Yeovil: Haynes. pp. 132–133. ISBN 978-0-857331-75-5.
