= Afra (disambiguation) =

Saint Afra (died 304) was a Christian martyr.

Afra or AFRA may also refer to:

== Places ==
- Afra, Iran; a village in Mazandaran Province, Iran
- Afra, Morocco; a village near Agdz
- Afra Bay, Andaman and Nicobar Islands, India
- St. Ulrich's and St. Afra's Abbey, Augsburg, Bavaria, Germany
- Sächsisches Landesgymnasium Sankt Afra zu Meißen, a school for gifted students in Meißen, Germany

== Groups, companies, organizations ==
- Afra Airlines, in Ghana
- Aircraft Fleet Recycling Association (AFRA)
- American Federation of Radio Artists (AFRA), later becoming the American Federation of Television and Radio Artists (AFTRA), later becoming SAG-AFTRA (Screen Actors Guild -- American Federation of Television and Radio Artists)

== Other uses ==
- Afra (name)
- Afra (moth), a genus of snout moths in the subfamily Epipaschiinae
- Afra language, a nearly extinct Papuan language

== See also ==
- Aframax, a size limitation on ships passing through the Suez Canal
- Aphra
