= Calendar (British TV programme) =

British regional TV news programme (since 1968)

- Also known as: Good Morning Calendar
- Genre: Regional news
- Presented by: Lara Rostron; Ian White
- Starring: Kerrie Gosney
- Countries of origin: England, United Kingdom
- Original language: English

Production
- Executive producer: Mark Hayman (Head of News)
- Production locations: Leeds, West Yorkshire, England
- Camera setup: Multi-camera
- Running time: 29 minutes (18:00 broadcast)
- Production company: ITV Yorkshire

Original release
- Network: ITV1 (ITV Yorkshire)
- Release: 29 July 1968 – present

Related
- ITV News; ITV Weather; Last Orders

ITV News Calendar is a British television news service broadcast and produced by ITV Yorkshire.

== Overview ==
The news service transmits to Yorkshire, Lincolnshire, northwestern Norfolk and parts of Derbyshire and Nottinghamshire areas of England. It is produced and broadcast from ITV Yorkshire's Leeds studios with district reporters and camera crews based at newsrooms in Hull, Lincoln, Sheffield and York.

The programme currently transmits into two sub regions.

- Calendar North serving West Yorkshire, North Yorkshire and parts of South Yorkshire, Derbyshire and Nottinghamshire.
- Calendar South serving East Yorkshire, Lincolnshire and parts of South Yorkshire, Nottinghamshire and Norfolk.

Freesat viewers in Mansfield, Ashfield, Newark and Bolsover receive Calendar East on channel 103 as default via those areas postcode.

In some (but not all) areas of North Yorkshire viewers have their aerials point to Bilsdale TV transmitter that broadcasts ITV News Tyne Tees from Gateshead, however most viewers in the county point their aerial to the Emley Moor or Oliver's Mount Transmitter to watch ITV News Calendar. Viewers in Scarborough and some in Filey receive ITV News Calendar from the relay transmitter at Oliver's Mount.

== History ==
=== 1968 to January 2007 ===
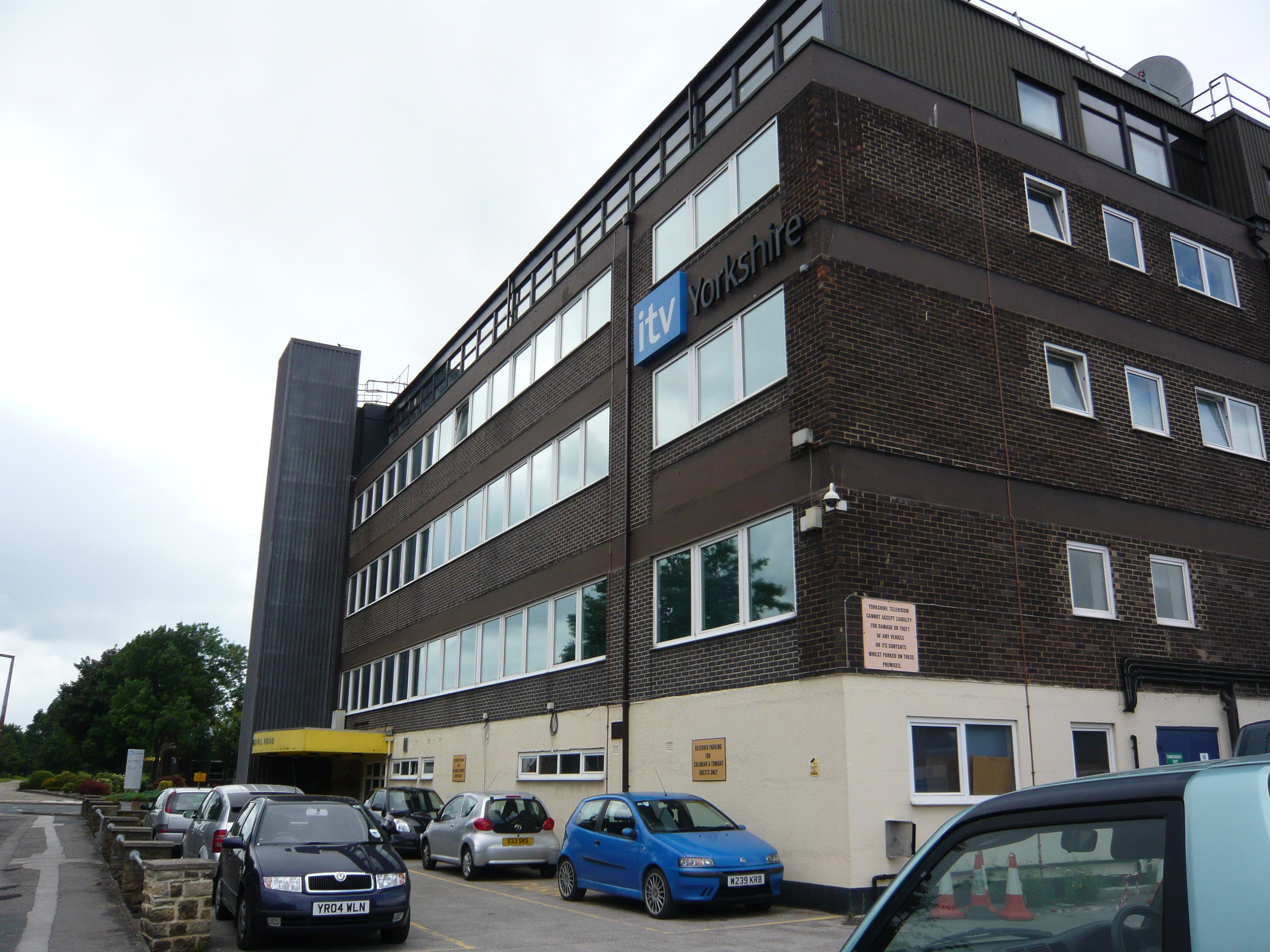
Calendar studios in Leeds

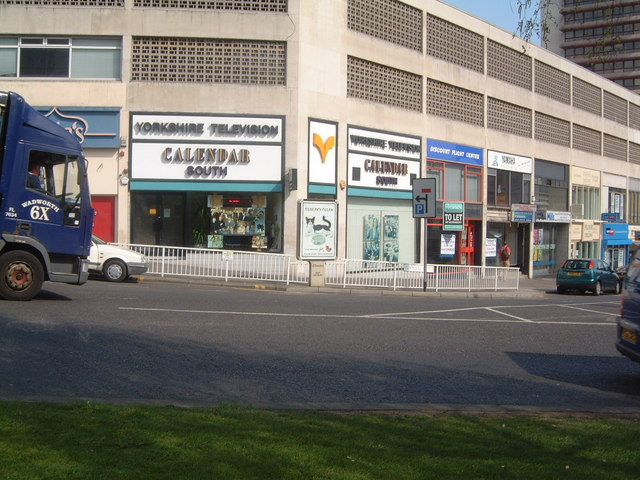
Former Calendar office on Charter Square roundabout in Sheffield

Calendar first aired on the launch day of Yorkshire Television – Monday 29 July 1968. Since its launch, the programme has been produced at ITV Yorkshire's main studios in Kirkstall Road, Leeds. Calendar's first presenter was Jonathan Aitken. In later years, it was hosted by Richard Whiteley (until 1995, alongside his duties on Countdown, earning him the nickname "Twice Nightly Whiteley"), Austin Mitchell (until he became a Labour Member of Parliament in 1977), Marylyn Webb, Christa Ackroyd and Mike Morris.

Upon gaining the Belmont transmitter in 1974 from Anglia Television, which served south Lincolnshire and north Norfolk, the programme developed a regional opt-out service for the area within the main programme. At the same time, Yorkshire Television inherited the Anglia news offices in Grimsby and Hull and opened a further newsroom in Lincoln. For several years until the early 1980s, viewers served by the Belmont transmitter also received a localised weather forecast produced by the weather department at Anglia.

On 28 March 1977, Yorkshire Television launched a six-week breakfast television experiment. Good Morning Calendar (a name later reused for its regional news programme in Good Morning Britain) is credited as being the United Kingdom's first breakfast television programme, six years before the launch of the BBC's Breakfast Time. The programme ran concurrently with a similar Tyne Tees programme, Good Morning North for North East viewers. Both series ended after nine weeks on 27 May 1977.

During the 1970s and early 1980s, Calendar's output consisted of a main evening programme alongside lunchtime and late night bulletins on weekdays; weekend bulletins were not introduced until June 1988. When ITV Schools programming was moved to Channel 4 in 1987 and daytime programming introduced to ITV, national ITN and regional bulletins were introduced at 9:25 am and 11:25 am, along with a mid-afternoon bulletin. In the latter part of the 1980s, Calendar expanded its lunchtime bulletin into a half-hour magazine show, Calendar Lunchtime Live. The programme was scrapped in early 1988 but reintroduced for a short period during 2001.

For over twenty years from June 1990, Calendar was produced and broadcast from a dedicated news centre and studio facility based in a converted roller rink opposite the main complex on Kirkstall Road.

On Monday 24 September 1990, a third sub-regional opt-out for south Yorkshire and north Derbyshire was introduced – "South" from Sheffield initially aired at lunchtime and within the main 6 pm programme, while "East" (Hull) aired in east Yorkshire, Lincolnshire and north Norfolk, and Calendar News was broadcast to the rest of the region (west and north Yorkshire). The separate East and South services continued until December 2006.

The newsgathering and production teams at Calendar were the subject of a 1995 fly-on-the-wall Channel 4 documentary series, Deadline.

=== January 2007 to February 2009 ===
On Monday, 8 January 2007, Calendar's main 6 pm programme was split into North and South editions for the region. All other bulletins (weekday and weekend lunchtime, weekday late, and weekend early evening) were pan-regional. The previous "East" and "South" regions were merged to form a larger "South" area.

"North" (north, west, and south west Yorkshire; north Derbyshire)
"South" (central and east Lincolnshire; east and south-east Yorkshire; east Nottinghamshire; north Norfolk).

The regular presenters of the North edition were Duncan Wood and Christine Talbot; two other long-standing Calendar presenters, John Shires and Gaynor Barnes, became the main regular presenters of the South edition. Both editions of the programme were broadcast from ITV Yorkshire's Leeds studios.

=== February 2009 to September 2013 ===
Cutbacks in ITV regional news coverage in early 2009 meant that its seventeen regions would be cut down to nine to "save costs", and regional news programmes would become pan-regional. The final sub-regional editions of Calendar aired on Wednesday 18 February 2009, with a new pan-regional programme launching the next day.

Short opt-outs are retained for the North and South sub-regions within the 6 pm programme and after News at Ten – either the North or South opt is pre-recorded depending on the day's news.

The then remaining sub-regional elements were:

- A 6-minute opt-out during the main 6 pm programme.
- The full 8-minute late night bulletin, following ITV News at Ten.

Both sub-regional editions utilise exactly the same presenters and studio/set, therefore one of the two opt-outs – depending on the day's news – is pre-recorded 'as live' shortly before broadcast.

Following a refit of the main Kirkstall Road studios to accommodate HD production of Emmerdale, the news centre opposite the building was closed and production of Calendar moved back into the main facility in October 2012.

=== September 2013 to present ===
The separate late night bulletins are also retained and localised weather forecasts were introduced. The expanded sub-regional service launched on Monday 16 September 2013. Calendar began broadcasting in high definition on Thursday 31 March 2016.

== Notable current on air staff ==
- Kerrie Gosney
- Tori Lacey

== Notable former on air staff ==
- Christa Ackroyd
- Jonathan Aitken
- Zeinab Badawi (BBC World News)
- Faye Barker (ITV News London)
- Nina Hossain (ITV Lunchtime News)
- Debbie Lindley
- Richard Madeley (GMB)
- Austin Mitchell (deceased)
- Jon Mitchell
- Mike Morris (deceased)
- Karen Petch (deceased)
- Christine Talbot
- Rachel Townsend (ITV News)
- Kate Walby (Lookaround)
- Bob Warman
- Richard Whiteley (deceased)
- Duncan Wood

Preceded by Lookaround	RTS: Television Journalism; Nations and Regions News Programme; 2012	Succeeded by Incumbent
