= Aphra =

Aphra may refer to:

- Aphra Brandreth (born 1978), British politician
- Aphra Behn (1640–1689), English playwright, poet, prose writer and translator
- Aphra Wilson (1895–1976), English plant pathologist
- Aphra: The Feminist Literary Magazine, academic journal
- Doctor Aphra, a fictional character in the Star Wars franchise
- Aphra (moth), a moth genus

== See also ==
- Afra (disambiguation)
