= Seymour Shifrin =

American composer

Seymour Shifrin (28 February 1926 – 26 September 1979) was an American composer. He was described by Time Magazine as "one of the most significant composers of his generation."

Shifrin's Satires of Circumstance (1964, text by Thomas Hardy) received the Koussevitzky International Recording Award for 1970. He received the Naumburg Award, Columbia University's Bearns Prize (1949), the Copley Award, the Horblit Prize (1963), and two Guggenheim Fellowships, in 1956 and 1959. A graduate of Columbia University (M.A., 1947), he was a member of the faculty at the University of California at Berkeley (1952–66) and at Brandeis University from 1966 until his death in 1979.

Shifrin studied with William Schuman, Otto Luening, and Darius Milhaud. A number of notable composers studied with Shifrin, including David Del Tredici, Pauline Oliveros, Terry Riley, and La Monte Young.

Orchestral Music:

- Music for Orchestra (1948)
- Chamber Symphony (1953)
- Three Pieces for Orchestra (1958)
- Chronicles for chorus, orchestra and soloists (1970)

Vocal and Choral Music

- Two Poems of Rainer Maria Rilke for voice and piano (1947)
- No Second Troy for voice and piano (Yeats) (1953
- A Medieval Latin Lyric for chorus SATB (1954)
- Odes of Shang for chorus, piano and percussion (1962)
- Satires of Circumstance for soprano, flute, clarinet, violin, cello and double bass (Thomas Hardy) 1964
- A Renaissance Garland for soprano, tenor, recorders, lute, viola da gambas, tuned percussion (1978)
- Five Last Songs for soprano and piano (1979)

Chamber Music:

- String quartets I-V (1949, 1962, 1965–66, 1966–67, 1971–72)
- Violin Sonata (1948)
- Sonata for Cello and Piano (1948)
- Serenade for Five Instruments (1954), commissioned by the Juilliard School of Music
- The Modern Temper for piano duet (1959)
- In Eius Memoriam for mixed quintet (1967–68)
- Duo for violin and piano (1968–69)
- Duettino for violin and piano (1972)
- Piano Trio (1974)
- The Nick of Time seven instruments (1977)

Solo Music:

- Four Cantos for Piano (1949)
- Composition for Piano (1950)
- Trauermusik for piano (1956)
- Concert Piece for Solo Violin (1959)
- Responses for Piano Solo (1973)
