= Francisco Arce Montes =

Spanish serial abuser and murderer (born 1950)

- Born: Francisco Xavier Arce Montes; 14 March 1950 (age 76); Gijon, Spain
- Status: Incarcerated
- Motive: Sexual
- Convictions: Rape, indecent assault, murder
- Criminal charges: Sexual assault, murder
- Penalty: 30 years

Francisco Xavier Arce Montes (born 14 March 1950) is a Spanish serial abuser and murderer who has been convicted of multiple counts of sexual assault and sexual abuse across Europe. Most of Montes' targets were around 11 or 12 years of age, and he is known to have committed assaults in Germany, Spain, France, the Netherlands, and the United States.

Montes told investigators that he had a miserable childhood. He was born the only son of middle-class parents who ran a corner grocery store. During his teens, he began to obsess over his personal hygiene and began doing things such as operating doorknobs and light-switches with a handkerchief. At 20, Montes exposed himself to a neighbor, and he was then diagnosed with depression and "progressive schizophrenia".

In 1981, Montes broke into the room of a girl in a youth hostel in the Netherlands and "touched her sexually against her wishes". The girl, now a woman, testified against Montes during a trial in 2005. Montes was also jailed in Germany during the mid-1980s for armed rape. Montes left a swath of other offenses across Europe.

Montes raped and murdered Caroline Dickinson, a 13-year-old Cornish schoolgirl visiting France with her class, on 18 July 1996, in a youth hostel in the small Breton town of Pleine-Fougères. Police later discovered that, prior to the murder of Dickinson on the night of 18 July, a man had slipped into a room at another youth hostel in nearby Saint-Lunaire but fled when one of the girls woke and turned the light on. Police continued to search for other similar incidents at youth hostels across France and continually came across the name of a Spanish man named Francisco Arce Montes staying at many of these hostels around the time of the attacks. French police put an all points bulletin across Europe for Montes, not knowing Montes had fled across the Atlantic.

The murder case went cold until Tommy Ontko, an immigration official at Detroit Airport, picked up an edition of a British newspaper and read the story about the five-year anniversary of the unsolved homicide. The article named Montes as a possible suspect and on a whim Ontko decided to do an immigration search to see if a man by that name had ever traveled to the United States. He found the name of a Francisco Arce-Montes, who in fact was in police custody in Miami Beach. Ontko contacted the French and British authorities and was able to confirm Montes' date of birth and hometown.

Montes had been arrested in Miami Beach for a lewd and lascivious assault on a female Irish tourist at a youth hostel, as detailed in the "Real Crime" documentary "The Caroline Dickinson Murder". The crime was similar to the modus operandi in the Dickinson case, with Montes able to enter the girls' room without waking the victim or her roommates. Montes was arrested by Sergeant (later Major) Angel Vazquez of the Miami Beach Police Department. Major Vazquez obtained DNA samples from Montes, which were matched to semen sample DNA from the youth hostel attack on the Irish student. In addition, Major Vazquez linked Montes to four other similar incidents on Miami Beach. Montes' DNA was later matched to the DNA samples from the Caroline Dickinson murder investigation. The State of Florida suspended its charges against Montes to allow for his extradition to France to stand charges for the murder of Dickinson.

The principal evidence against Montes was provided by DNA analysis. Montes was evaluated by a psychologist, who told the court that he displayed evidence of the "evident, male pedophile attitude". During the trial, a statement was read from Montes' mother in which she disavowed him, saying that she would rather "sleep rough" than share a house with him. Montes was sentenced to 30 years in prison on 14 June 2004. On appeal a year later, Montes' conviction and sentence were upheld and he abandoned a subsequent further appeal.

== See also ==
- Murder of Lindsay Rimer, unsolved 1994 murder which has been linked to Montes
