= Aphra sanguipalpis =

Scientific classification
- Domain: Eukaryota
- Kingdom: Animalia
- Phylum: Arthropoda
- Class: Insecta
- Order: Lepidoptera
- Superfamily: Noctuoidea
- Family: Erebidae
- Subfamily: Arctiinae
- Genus: Aphra
- Species: A. sanguipalpis

Binomial name
- Aphra sanguipalpis Dognin, 1907

Species of moth

Aphra sanguipalpis is a moth of the subfamily Arctiinae. It was described by Paul Dognin in 1907. It found in Peru.
