= Christine Talbot =

British television journalist and presenter

Christine Talbot is a British television journalist and presenter who worked for ITV Yorkshire as a main presenter for its flagship news programme ITV News Calendar.

== Career ==
Christine trained at Lancashire Polytechnic's School of Journalism from 1984–85. Before joining ITV in 1994, Talbot worked on local newspapers in Lancashire. She then joined BBC North West as a presenter and reporter for North West Tonight. During her time at ITV, Talbot presented a number of regional programmes including the defunct magazine show Tonight (between 1996 and 2000) and several documentary series including Is It Worth It?, Silent Killer and Xposed.

She was also a pioneer presenter on the early satellite Health and beauty channel, Wellbeing between 2000 and 2001.

Since 2001, Talbot has been the main co-anchor of Calendar, appearing with Geoff Druett until Friday 23 May 2003 and is now currently alongside Duncan Wood. Her first programme with Duncan Wood was on Tuesday 27 May 2003 at 6pm.

Christine was named O2 presenter of the year for her region in 2015 as well as O2 Journalist of the year in 2016. She was also named Journalist of the Year by the Yorkshire Royal Television Society in 2015. She was named the Yorkshire Society Media Personality in 2015 and The Yorkshire Choice Media Personality of the Year 2016.

On 30 June 2021 Christine presented her final Calendar after 20 years at ITV Yorkshire. and now works as a freelance presenter and journalist.

== Personal life ==
Christine lives near Wetherby with husband Chris Gregg and daughter Beth.

On 30 January 2012, it was announced on Calendar that Talbot had been diagnosed with breast cancer, and would be taking a break from the programme for treatment and recovery. On 29 June 2012, Talbot spoke to local newspaper Yorkshire Evening Post about her illness. On 28 December 2012 it was revealed Talbot had "undergone a gruelling 12 months" and would return to work on 14 January 2013.
