= Deadline (1995 TV series) =

- Genre: Documentary
- Directed by: Bernard Hall; Leanne Pooley
- Composers: Mark Sayer-Wade; Tolga Kashif
- Country of origin: United Kingdom
- Original language: English
- No. of series: 1
- No. of episodes: 6

Production
- Executive producers: Brian Hill; Ruth Pitt
- Editor: Stuart Briggs
- Running time: 1x50 mins; 5x25mins
- Production company: Real Life Productions

Original release
- Network: Channel 4
- Release: 20 March – 1 May 1995

Deadline is a British fly-on-the-wall documentary series following the journalists at Yorkshire Television's local news service, Calendar. It was broadcast as a series of six episodes on Channel 4 from 20 March to 1 May 1995 as part of its Whose News? season.

== Production ==
Yorkshire Television agreed to allow access to Channel 4's fly-on-the-wall documentary series following ITN's refusal to take part in the project. Most of the Calendar team took part in the documentary rather than be accused of hypocrisy; Christa Ackroyd says, "how could I, a TV journalist whose job it is to persuade others to appear on camera, refuse to take part when the tables were turned?".

The documentary crew spent three months following the newsgatherers at Yorkshire TV. Some material was removed from the broadcast version. Journalist Alan Hardwick was captured making some, what The Guardian's media editor labels "fairly abusive", remarks about criminals. Ackroyd reports that some people refused to sign release forms, and 'no filming' areas were established.

Yorkshire TV were unhappy at the documentary's press release, which began: "Coming up in just a moment, the biggest petunia in the world – and the man whose grown it. But first, the Bradford murder." Channel 4 thought that the sentence reflected Calendar's diverse content, but Yorkshire were concerned that it made them look silly. The press was requested not to use the offending words.

== Episodes ==
The first episode focussed upon the media coverage of the disappearance of schoolgirl Lindsay Rimer in November 1994, whose body was recovered shortly after the episode was broadcast. This first episode also covered more trivial stories, such as the launch of a new cheese, and a live interview with Coronation Street actress Lynne Perrie, who was promoting her autobiography.

== Reception ==
Tom Sutcliffe, in The Independent, expressed concern over the length of the series, suggesting that it might become "too much of a good thing" and the focus upon a regional news service ("a little local runabout", writes Sutcliffe) rather than "the great national juggernauts". Much of Sutcliffe's criticisms were about the journalistic practices and integrity of the Calendar team; he questions its staging of police briefings, and the decision to devote airtime to the launch of a cheese.
