= Aphra nyctemeroides =

Scientific classification
- Domain: Eukaryota
- Kingdom: Animalia
- Phylum: Arthropoda
- Class: Insecta
- Order: Lepidoptera
- Superfamily: Noctuoidea
- Family: Erebidae
- Subfamily: Arctiinae
- Genus: Aphra
- Species: A. nyctemeroides

Binomial name
- Aphra nyctemeroides (Walker, 1869)

Synonyms
- Olina nyctemeroides Walker, 1869

Species of moth

Aphra nyctemeroides is a moth of the subfamily Arctiinae. It was described by Francis Walker in 1869. It found in Brazil.
