= Elizabeth Fisher (journalist) =

American author and editor

Elizabeth Fisher

Elizabeth Fisher (1924 – 1 January 1982, Sag Harbor, New York) was a US author and editor of the Aphra: The Feminist Literary Magazine. Fisher's best-known work is Woman's Creation: Sexual Evolution and the Shaping of Society, in which she tells the story of human evolution from a feminist point of view

== Life ==
Fisher attended Smith College in Northampton, Massachusetts and worked as a cultural columnist for The Rome American in Rome in the 1950s. She was also one of the founders of the literary magazine Aphra in 1969. Her articles have appeared in New York Times, in The Nation and in the New York Post. She taught at the Women's Writer's Centre at Cazenovia College as a visiting professor and taught Women's Studies at New York University. She was also a translator of novels and dramas.

Fisher was married and had one child. She committed suicide in her Sag Harbor studio on New Year's Day 1982.

== Work ==
Fisher's best-known work is Woman's Creation: Sexual Evolution and the Shaping of Society, in which she tells the story of human evolution from a feminist point of view. She begins with the question of why women are considered property that can be exchanged or sold. Men, as a clear contrast, first defined themselves through this possession. The (natural) sciences have not been spared these social attributions either. Nature was often defined as something to be conquered, possessed or mastered. Male sexuality was characterised not only as aggressive, but also as desirable. The woman was seen as "the first conquered territory", which was peacefully minded. Fisher criticises these naturalising attributions of the man as an aggressive conqueror, who had a naturally higher strength than the peaceful woman. It shows that there are other stories of the origins of humanity that were organised as matriarchy or egalitarianism. Drawing on sociology, ethnology and anthropology, Fisher argues that women were the first inventors in the hunter-gatherer phase. Thus, the development of agriculture and animal husbandry is said to be due to female innovation.

The seventh chapter of the book The Carrier Bag Theory of Evolution inspired the science fiction author Ursula K. Le Guin to write her essay The Carrier Bag Theory of Fiction, in which she conceptualises narration as a "carrier bag" in which various things and stories are gathered together.

The publication was nominated for the Pulitzer Prize in 1979.
