= Aphra trivittata =

Scientific classification
- Kingdom: Animalia
- Phylum: Arthropoda
- Class: Insecta
- Order: Lepidoptera
- Superfamily: Noctuoidea
- Family: Erebidae
- Subfamily: Arctiinae
- Genus: Aphra
- Species: A. trivittata

Binomial name
- Aphra trivittata (Walker, 1854)

Synonyms
- Dioptis trivittata Walker, 1854

Species of moth

Aphra trivittata is a moth of the subfamily Arctiinae. It was described by Francis Walker in 1854. It found in Brazil.
