= Aphra flavicosta =

Scientific classification
- Domain: Eukaryota
- Kingdom: Animalia
- Phylum: Arthropoda
- Class: Insecta
- Order: Lepidoptera
- Superfamily: Noctuoidea
- Family: Erebidae
- Subfamily: Arctiinae
- Genus: Aphra
- Species: A. flavicosta

Binomial name
- Aphra flavicosta (Herrich-Schäffer, 1855)

Synonyms
- Ecdemus flavicosta Herrich-Schäffer, 1855; Phara missionum Jörgensen, 1913

Species of moth

Aphra flavicosta is a moth of the subfamily Arctiinae. It was described by Gottlieb August Wilhelm Herrich-Schäffer in 1855. It found in Argentina.
