= David Del Tredici =

American composer (1937–2023)

- Born: March 16, 1937; Cloverdale, California, U.S.
- Died: November 18, 2023 (aged 86); New York City, U.S.
- Education: University of California, Berkeley; Princeton University
- Occupation: Composer
- Known for: Neo-romanticism
- Notable work: In Memory of a Summer Day; Tattoo
- Awards: Pulitzer Prize for Music (1980); Guggenheim Fellow; Woodrow Wilson Fellowship

David Walter Del Tredici (March 16, 1937 – November 18, 2023) was an American composer. He won a Pulitzer Prize for Music and was a Guggenheim and Woodrow Wilson fellow. Del Tredici is considered a pioneer of the neo-romantic movement. He was also described by the Los Angeles Times as "one of our most flamboyant outsider composers".

== Early life and education ==
Del Tredici was born in Cloverdale, California, on March 16, 1937. He came from a non-musical family and began his musical life as an aspiring concert pianist at the age of twelve, taking piano lessons with German concert pianist Bernhard Abramovitch. If he had not been a pianist, he said, he would have become a florist.

Abramovitsch encouraged him to be "very creative" in his playing, which he later cited as prepared him for composing. "I was only interested in playing ... great sprawling things like the Schumann Fantasy, that the performer had to mold and shape", he reflected. Thus he learned how to "sustain a [musical] thread so that it was never broken".

He debuted with the San Francisco Symphony at age 16 and later performed Liszt and Tchaikovsky concertos under Arthur Fiedler. Then he attended the University of California, Berkeley, where he continued studying piano. He played primarily Romantic works. He also played "a lot of Schoenberg and Berg and loved their music".

While enrolled at Berkeley, he attended the Aspen Music Festival and School. The pianist he was going to study with was "mean" to him, so Del Tredici tried his hand at composing music instead. He wrote Opus 1 as his first piece and was invited to perform it for Milhaud, who complimented him. Thereafter Del Tredici concentrated on composition. His earliest works were his "own version of German expressionism". Finishing his studies with Seymour Shifrin at Berkeley, he graduated in 1959.

He then studied composition with Earl Kim and Roger Sessions for one year at Princeton University on a Woodrow Wilson Fellowship. Princeton was then, Tim Page described, "the center for the American atonal avant-garde". "I was there at the height of the serial movement," Del Tredici said. He felt like an outsider: "[They] seemed to be trying to take the expressionist element out of German expressionism," he added.

Del Tredici left Princeton to work with Robert Helps in New York. He found a mentor in Helps, who supported his instincts. He returned to Princeton, earning his MFA in 1963.

== Career ==
In 1964, Del Tredici met Aaron Copland at Tanglewood; they would be friends for the remainder of Copland's life, and his musical style remained an influence on Del Tredici.

Del Tredici taught at Harvard University, where he worked alongside Leon Kirchner and was a part of the modernist movement. He stated that "anything bad appeals to any young composer", including himself.

Much of Del Tredici's work was inspired by literature, including author and poet James Joyce. As a fellow lapsed Catholic, Del Tredici was attracted to Joyce's struggles with his own Catholic past and "tortured life", which found voice in Del Tredici's "dissonant and nearly atonal" style. He also found inspiration in Martin Gardner's The Annotated Alice and its commentary on the works of Lewis Carroll. During this period, he found himself moving back towards tonality, which he felt was more appropriate for works such as his Final Alice and Adventures Underground.

Del Tredici was Composer-In-Residence at the New York Philharmonic from 1988 until 1990. In 1999 and 2000 he taught at Yale University. He also taught at Boston University, Juilliard School, and the University of Buffalo. As of 2013, he was a faculty member of the City College of New York.

Towards the end of his life, Del Tredici continued to draw on literature for his song cycles. His work continued to draw on Lewis Carroll (particularly Alice in Wonderland), but he was also inspired by contemporary American poets. He also created works celebrating "gayness", acknowledging that many great composers were gay and that "it's something to be celebrated". A reviewer noted that themes in his work examine "tormented relationships, personal transformations, and the joys and sorrows of gay life". He was a member of the American Academy of Arts and Letters and held additional residencies at Yaddo, the Virginia Center for the Creative Arts, and the MacDowell Colony.

== Death ==
Del Tredici died of Parkinson's disease at his home in Manhattan on November 18, 2023, at the age of 86.

== Works ==
Del Tredici composed work for Michael Tilson Thomas and the Buffalo Philharmonic Orchestra. His work Adventures Underground drew inspiration from the poem The Mouse's Tail. Del Tredici also composed works influenced by rock and folk music. He wrote works for Phyllis Bryn-Julson, the San Francisco Symphony, and the New York Philharmonic. He also composed an opera and song cycles. He wrote music using the work of, or as tribute to, Chana Bloch, Colette Inez, Allen Ginsberg, Thom Gunn, Paul Monette, and Alfred Corn.

His In Memory of a Summer Day (part one of Child Alice) won Del Tredici a Pulitzer Prize. That piece was developed into a ballet, which has been performed by the National Ballet of Canada and the Grand Théâtre de Genève. In 1988, his work Tattoo, commissioned by the Concertgebouw Orchestra, was debuted by Leonard Bernstein and the New York Philharmonic.

- 1988, Tattoo, Concertgebouw Orchestra
- 1990, Steps, New York Philharmonic
- 1998, The Spider and the Fly, New York Philharmonic
- 1998, Chana's Story, San Francisco Contemporary Players
- 1999, Dracula, Eos Orchestra
- 2003, In Wartime, University of Texas at Austin Wind Ensemble
- 2004, Gotham Glory, fp. March 15, 2005, Anthony de Mare, piano
- 2004, Syzygy, Asko Ensemble
- 2013, Bullycide, La Jolla Music Society

== Awards ==
- Guggenheim Fellowship
- Pulitzer Prize for Music
- Woodrow Wilson Fellowship
- Kennedy Center Friedheim Award

== Bibliography ==
- Lozier, Frederick Joseph. 1993. "Idiomatic, notational, and stylistic elements in the piano works of David Del Tredici". DMA dissertation. Athens: University of Georgia. ISBN 979-820859147-5. ProQuest 304055736.
