= Helen Neville =

American psychologist & scholar

- Born: May 20, 1946; Unity, Saskatchewan, Canada
- Died: October 12, 2018 (aged 72); Eugene, Oregon, U.S.
- Awards: 2014 National Academy of Sciences, 2013 Distinguished Cognitive Scientist Award UC Merced, 2013 RHSU Edu-Scholar Presence Rankings for 2012 etc.

Helen J. Neville (May 20, 1946 – October 12, 2018) was a Canadian psychologist and neuroscientist known internationally for her research in the field of human brain development. Neville was the Robert and Beverly Lewis Endowed Chair and Professor of Psychology and Neuroscience, Director of the Brain Development Lab, and Director of the Center for Cognitive Neuroscience at the University of Oregon. She was Director of the Laboratory for Neuropsychology at the Salk Institute and a professor in the Department of Cognitive Science at UCSD before joining the faculty at the University of Oregon in 1995.

== Personal life and education ==
Neville received a B.A. from the University of British Columbia, an M.A. from Simon Fraser University, and a Ph.D. from Cornell University, and she also completed a postdoctoral fellowship in neuroscience at the University of California, San Diego.

== Research and publications ==
Neville studied in cerebral specialization, neuroplasticity of the brain in childhood and adulthood, the roles of biological constraints and experience, and neurolinguistics. In order to investigate these topics, Neville used a variety of methods, including behavioral measures, event-related potentials (ERPs), and structural and functional magnetic resonance imaging (fMRI). Neville's research has helped to distinguish between the brain systems and functions that are largely fixed from those which are modifiable by experience, and with all her work she aimed to make a positive, tangible difference in society. She was involved in a number of outreach programs and charities in addition to scientific research.

Her research topics included the neural mechanisms of grammar acquisition in adults, attentional control mechanisms as they relate to working memory, as well as various types of attention and learning mechanisms in young children.

Neville and the Brain Development Lab were also responsible for creating "Changing Brains", a program of video segments aimed at non-scientists to describe what research has revealed the effects of experience on human brain development. The series aimed to inform parents, teachers and policymakers on how to help children develop to their full potential. Neurologist Oliver Sacks said the program was "...fascinating and very original in form and presentation — and exactly the way to present (brain) science to non-scientists."

She was the author of the book Temperament tools: working with your child's inborn traits (1998)

== Honors and awards ==
Neville was a member of the American Academy of Arts and Sciences and a fellow of the American Psychological Society and Society of Experimental Psychologists. In 2013, she received the William James Fellow Award from the Association for Psychological Science. Other awards that she received for her work in psychology are listed below:

2014	National Academy of Sciences
2013	Distinguished Cognitive Scientist Award, UC Merced
2013	RHSU Edu-Scholar Presence Rankings for 2012
2012	William James Fellow Award, Assoc. for Psychological Science
2012	Honorary Degree, Georgetown University
2012	Hebb Lecturer, Georgetown University
2011	Keynote Address, International Mind, Brain, and Education Society
2011	Recipient, Fondation Ipsen Neuronal Plasticity Prize
2008	Distinguished Lecturer, University of Toronto
2007	Member, American Academy of Arts and Sciences
2007	Invited Address, Society for Research in Child Development
2007	Landsdowne Lecturer, University of Victoria
2005	Keynote Addresses: Cognitive Development Society Biennial Meeting and Emory Cognition Project Conference on Developmental Cognitive Neuroscience
2004	Participant, Mind & Life Institute XII meeting with the Dalai Lama, Dharamsala, India
2003	Keynote Speaker, Symposium for Queen’s 60th Birthday, "The Children in Her Majesty’s Crown", Stockholm
2002–present	Recipient, Robert and Beverly Lewis Endowed Chair
2001–present	Member, Society of Experimental Psychologists
2001	Fellow, The American Psychological Society
2000	Recipient, Justine and Yves Sergent Award, Montreal, Canada
1999-2003	Distinguished Lecturer: Florida State University, Duke University, University of Maryland, University of Washington, and University of Texas, Health Science Center, Houston
1998–present	Panel Chair, Sackler Institute for Human Brain Development
1998–present	Assoc. Editor, Journal of Cognitive Neuroscience
1998	Invited address, Society for Neuroscience
1998	Member, National Science Foundation Workshop on Cognitive Neuroscience
1998	Sprague Lecturer, University of Pennsylvania
1996–present	Member, Board of Governors, Cognitive Neuroscience Society
1993-1997	Claude Pepper Award
