= Frances Cowen =

British writer

- Born: 27 December 1915; Oxford, England
- Died: 1992 (aged 76–77)
- Education: Ursuline Convent, Oxford; Milham Ford School
- Occupation: Writer
- Spouse: George Heinrich Munthe (1938, died 1941)
- Children: 1
- Parent(s): Joseph and Helen (Ainscough) Cowen
- Writing career
- Pen name: Eleanor Hyde
- Genres: Adult suspense novels; Romance; Mysteries for children

Frances Cowen (27 December 1915 − 1992) was a British writer of romantic suspense novels and books for children. Her work appeared under the pseudonym Eleanor Hyde as well as her own name. She was also at times known by the names Frances Munthe and Frances Minto-Cowen.

In addition to writing, Cowen worked for Blackwell's in Oxford, England, in 1938−39; was a member of Air Raid Precautions staff in Dartmouth, Devon, during World War II, and was assistant secretary for the Royal Literary Fund in London from 1955 through 1966. Cowen contributed to anthologies, Good Housekeeping, Woman's Weekly, Oxford Times, and other periodicals and newspapers. She was a staff member of Little Folks magazine and a member of PEN International and of the Crime Writers' Association.

== Personal life ==
The daughter of Joseph and Helen Cowen, Frances Cowen was born in Oxford, where she was educated at an Ursuline convent and the Milham Ford School for girls. She married George Heinrich Munthe in 1938; he died in 1941. They had one child, a daughter, Mary.

== Bibliography ==
=== Romantic suspense novels ===
As Frances Cowen

- The Little Heiress (1961) OCLC 30242672
- The Balcony (1962) OCLC 30239623
- A Step in the Dark (1962) OCLC 30241931
- The Desperate Holiday (1962) OCLC 30238419
- The Elusive Quest (1965) OCLC 752470366
- The Bitter Reason (1966) OCLC 30293731
- Scented Danger (1966) OCLC 30275862
- The One Between (1967) OCLC 30278373
- The Gentle Obsession (1968) OCLC 30267944
- The Fractured Silence (1969) OCLC 30274244
- The Daylight Fear (1969) OCLC 560064122
- The Shadow of Polperro (1969) OCLC 30299854
- Edge of Terror (1970) OCLC 30267634
- The Hounds of Carvello (1970) OCLC 30274474
- The Nightmare Ends (1970) OCLC 30291907
- The Lake of Darkness (1971) OCLC 16217237
- The Unforgiving Moment (1971) OCLC 16193817
- The Curse of the Clodaghs (1973) OCLC 16231513
- Shadow of Theale (1974) OCLC 13172587
- The Village of Fear (1974) OCLC 18679849
- The Secret of Weir House (1975) OCLC 59703172
- The Dangerous Child (1975) OCLC 59702829
- The Haunting of Helen Farley (1976) OCLC 59826575
- The Medusa Connection (1976) OCLC 16365752
- Sinister Melody (1976) OCLC 16291560
- The Silent Pool (1977) OCLC 59828987
- The Lost One (1977) OCLC 59828371
- Gateway to Nowhere (1978) OCLC 16442323
- The House Without a Heart (1978) OCLC 59830503
- The House of Larne. (1980) OCLC 16554152
- Wait for the Night (1980) OCLC 16484778
- The Elusive Lover (1981) OCLC 59839018
- Sunrise at Even (1982) OCLC 16585246

As Eleanor Hyde

- Tudor Maid (1972) OCLC 609514
- Tudor Masquerade (1972) OCLC 2649901
- Tudor Mayhem (1973) OCLC 16251709
- Tudor Mystery (1974) OCLC 16303155
- Tudor Myth (1976) OCLC 623383360
- Tudor Mausoleum (1977) OCLC 16380966
- Tudor Murder (1977) OCLC 16385257
- Tudor Mansion (1978) OCLC 16431291
- Tudor Malice (1979) OCLC 16482073
- The Princess Passes (1979) OCLC 59833750

=== Books for children ===
As Frances Cowen

- In the Clutch of the Green Hand (1929) OCLC 221384093
- The Wings That Failed (1931) OCLC 315837206
- The Milhurst Mystery (1933) OCLC 560064238
- The Conspiracy of Silence (1935) OCLC 774511042
- The Perilous Adventure (1936) OCLC 560064303
- Laddie's Way (1939) OCLC 30188208
- The Girl Who Knew Too Much (1940) OCLC 774511044
- Mystery Tower (1945) OCLC 560064262
- Honor Bound (1946) OCLC 810762233
- Castle in Wales (1947) OCLC 315837113
- The Secret of Arrivol (1947) OCLC 315837193
- Mystery at the Walled House (1951) OCLC 30177844
- The Little Countess (1954) OCLC 30205846
- The Riddle of the Rocks (1956) OCLC 30198717
- Clover Cottage (1958) OCLC 30228959
- The Secret of Grange Farm (1961) OCLC 794016472
- The Secret of the Loch (1963) OCLC 30223838
