= Afra Bukhari =

Pakistani writer (1938–2022)

Afra Bukhari (14 March 1938 – 2 January 2022) was a Pakistani writer, best known for her short stories in the Urdu language.

== Biography ==
Bukhari was born in 1938, in Amritsar, British Raj, and moved to Lahore in Pakistan after the partition of India in 1947. She studied at the Government College in Lahore, and began writing short stories in Urdu for her children in 1959. In 1978, after the death of her husband, she stopped writing and devoted her time to her family, but resumed writing and publishing in the 1990s. During the course of her career, she published five collections of her short stories: in 1964 she published Faasle (tr: Distances), and in 1998 she published Nijaat (tr: Salvation). In 2003, she published Ret Mein Paoon (tr: Feet in the Sand) and in 2009, she published Aaank aur Andhera (tr: The Eye and the Darkness). Her last collection of stories, Sang-e-Siyah (tr: Black Stone) was published in 2021, shortly before her death. She also published stories in a number of Pakistani literary magazines, and her only novel, Pehchaan (tr: Identity) was never completed. A partially-written memoir, Us Ki Zindagi (tr: Her Life) was also left incomplete at the time of her death. Bukhari was a well-known writer who was acclaimed by her colleagues: when her work was published in the Hindi journal Hans, the Hindi writer Premchand praised her writing, giving her the title of "rebellious short story writer," and critic and translator Asif Farrukhi compared her to Virginia Woolf. Her son, Amir Faraz, is also a writer, and her daughter Fatima Ali is a journalist. Bukhara died on 2 January 2022, at the age of 83.
