= Yassine El Idrissi =

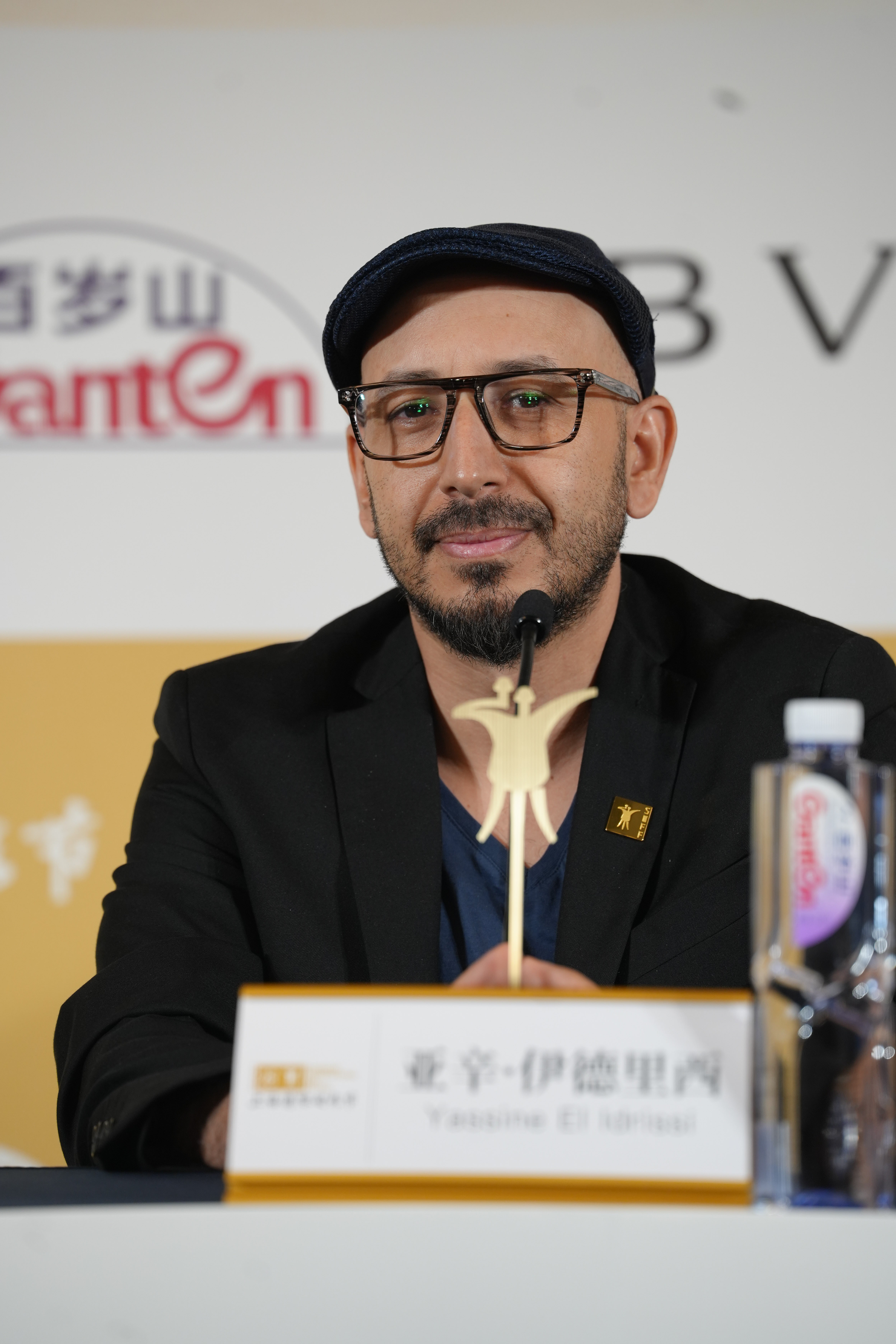
- El Idrissi at the 2026 Shanghai International Film Festival
- Born: 1983 (age 42–43); Morocco
- Occupations: Filmmaker, photojournalist
- Awards: Best Director, 28th Shanghai International Film Festival

Yassine El Idrissi is a Moroccan film director, screenwriter, producer, and former photojournalist.

== Early life and education ==
El Idrissi was born in Morocco in 1983, where he first began as a photojournalist before becoming a filmmaker. El Idrissi graduated from Netherlands Film Academy with a MFA in Film in 2013.

== Career ==
El Idrissi made his documentary debut in 2009 with Waiting for the Snow.

El Idrissi continued to work on numerous films such as The Iranian Film, which screened International Film Festival Rotterdam in 2014.

El Idrissi won the Best Director award at the 28th Shanghai International Film Festival for his film Halima in 2026. Halima was the first Moroccan film to compete at the festival since 1999.
