= Hans Aarsman =

Dutch photographer, author, and lecturer (born 1951)

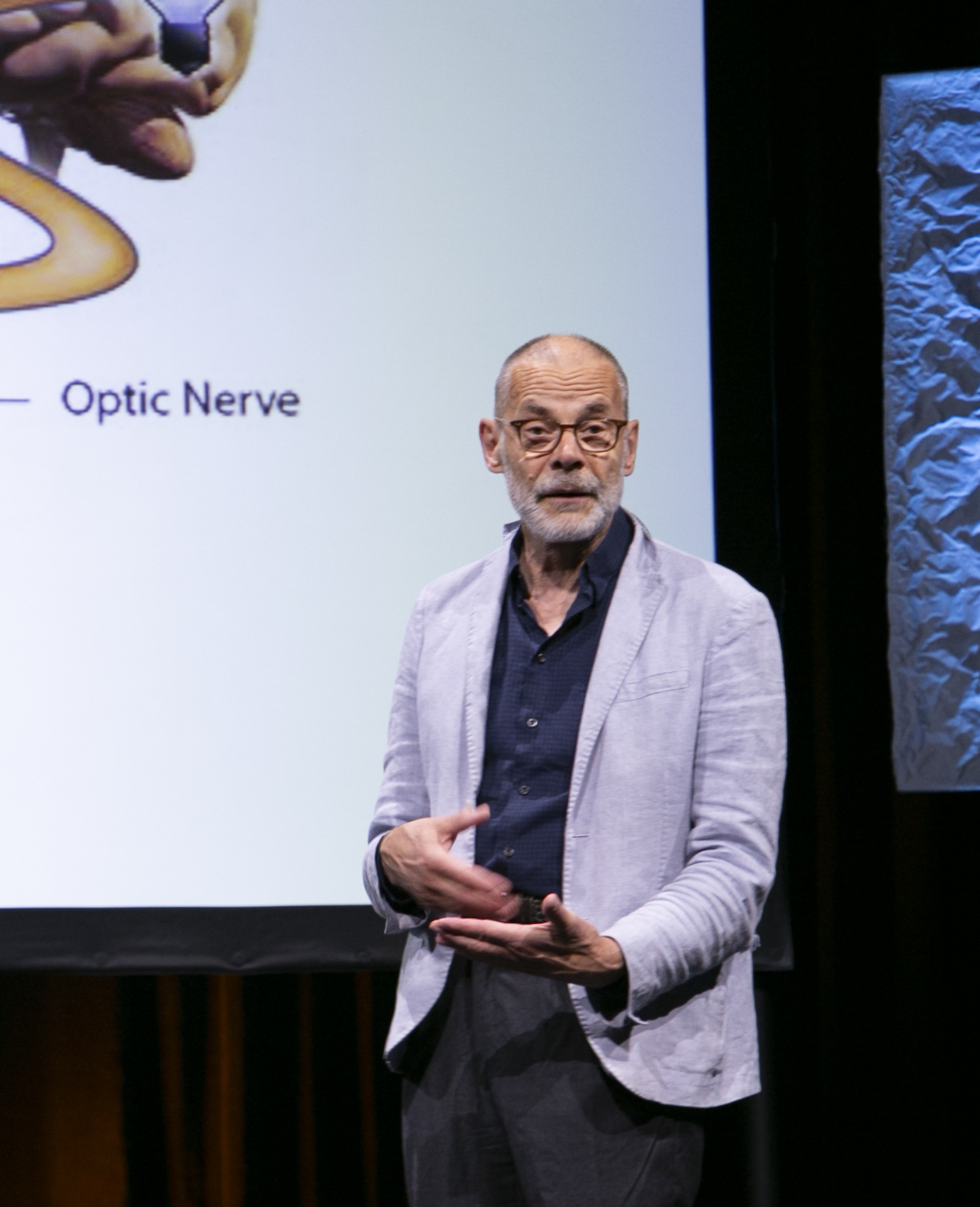
- Born: 1951 (age 74–75); Amsterdam, Netherlands
- Website: hansaarsman.nl

Hans Aarsman (Amsterdam, 27 December 1951) is a Dutch author and former photographer. He is best known for his bi-weekly column “The Aarsman Collection” in de Volkskrant, in which he examines press photos like a detective. He also appears regularly on stage, where he engagingly reports on his investigative methods.

== Life and work ==
Aarsman began as a photo-journalist for newspapers such as Trouw, de Volkskrant, Nieuwe Revu and De Groene Amsterdammer. In 1989 he published Hollandse Taferelen, landscapes shot from the roof of his camper van while travelling the Netherlands for a year. During that journey he started to write. He followed up with the 1993 photo book Aarsmans Amsterdam, after which he stopped photographing and concentrated on writing. In 2003 he released Vrrooom! Vrrooom!, combining car photographs with diary fragments.

Aarsman received the Maria Austria Prize in 1993 and the Hendrik de Vries Prize in 2011.

From 1996 to 2023 he taught at the Rijksakademie van beeldende kunsten in Amsterdam.

The Nederlands Fotomuseum has acquired part of Aarsman's archive; since 2006 portions have been available for private download and A3-size printing.

Since 2004 Aarsman has written his fortnightly de Volkskrant column “The Aarsman Collection”, methodically analysing news photos. For him, the story a picture tells outweighs its aesthetic qualities. Inspired by Sherlock Holmes's analytical approach, he calls himself a photo-detective. Until 1999 he was also a columnist for NRC.

He has penned several theatre monologues for actors including Tom Jansen, Dirk Roofthooft and Carly Wijs. Josse De Pauw performed his monologue Ruis, about photographer Garry Winogrand. Since 2012 Aarsman has presented his latest discoveries on stage himself.

Together with Erik Kessels, Hans van der Meer and others, Aarsman has edited the magazine Useful Photography (2001–present).

In 2007 he was guest curator for the Stedelijk Museum's Municipal Acquisitions exhibition “Off the Record”, inviting artists to submit works made from a desire to record something without an explicit artistic goal. Chance and discovery were central themes.

In 2012 he guest-curated the photo exhibition “Thanks to the Bridges” at the Wereldmuseum Amsterdam. The museum asked him to delve into the collection because “he often notices what others overlook, and focuses not only on what is visible but also on what should be there”.

At Galerie Ron Mandos he curated the group show “Decide for Yourself”, bringing together artists who, like Aarsman, reveal how they investigate the world—an exhibition of indexes, surprising finds and even Sesame Street wisdom.

In February 2015 Aarsman was appointed guest curator of UNESCO's World Heritage Podium.

He was a recurring guest on the Dutch TV talkshow De Wereld Draait Door in 2011, offering original analyses of press photos, and returned to television in 2021 the TV show Beau.

== Publications ==
- 1989 Hollandse taferelen (photo book)
- 1993 Aarsmans Amsterdam (photo book)
- 1995 Twee hoofden, één kussen (literature)
- 1995 Het engeltje dat op mijn tong pieste (essays)
- 1996 De wijze van zaal 7 (play)
- 2003 Vrrooom! Vrrooom! (photo book)
- 2009 Ik zie ik zie. De Aarsman Collectie (essays)
- 2011 Gedachten bij het wachten tot de schepping aanreikt wat je niet wist dat je in gedachten met je meedroeg. Fotobesprekingen (essays)
- 2012 De fotodetective (essays)
- 2012 Dankzij de bruggen. Hans Aarsman doet een ontdekking in het Tropenmuseum (tentoonstellingscatalogus)
- 2014 Wat jij niet ziet. De Aarsman Collectie (essays)
- 2020 De ene die alles ziet. De Aarsman Collectie 2014-2020 (essays)

== Collections ==
Aarsman's work is held in the following permanent collections:

- Netherlands Photo Museum, Rotterdam, the Netherlands
- Rijksmuseum, Amsterdam
- Stedelijk Museum Amsterdam, the Netherlands
