= Jon Mitchell (meteorologist) =

British meteorologist

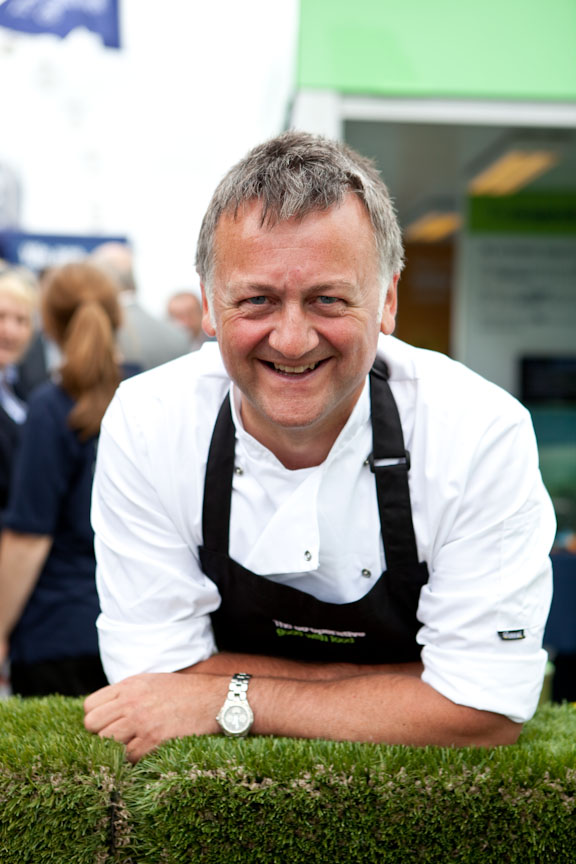
Jon Mitchell in 2011

Jon Mitchell is a British meteorologist and weather presenter.

== Early life ==
He grew up in Morecambe in Lancashire, attending Lancaster Grammar School (since 1971 Lancaster Grammar School).

== Career ==
Jon Mitchell started work with the Met Office on leaving school in 1978. At that time he described work as:

"We spent most of our time plotting charts with two pens sellotaped together. The finished product was a work of art that took three solid hours sitting at a desk to complete."

In 1986 Jon was posted to the Leeds weather centre. His first televised TV forecast was when he was asked to stand in for Bob Rust. However, at this time he just provided a voice for the forecast and did not appear in vision.

He became a weather presenter for Yorkshire Television in 1989. Though some regional forecasts were broadcast without an in-vision presenter pre-2002. In addition, on occasions he also appeared on ITV Granada and ITV Tyne Tees & Border.

Mitchell also presented the national ITV Weather forecasts, between 2006 and 2008, on occasions when their team were not available.

Mitchell retired from ITV on 29 July 2022.

== Personal life ==
Mitchell resides in Burley in Wharfedale, a small village near Bradford, West Yorkshire, England with his wife and two daughters.
