= Harm van den Dorpel =

Dutch artist

- Born: 1981 (age 44–45); Zaandam, Netherlands
- Known for: Conceptual art, installation art, sculpture, collage, Internet art, Postinternet art
- Awards: net based award, Haus der Elektronischen Künste Basel (2016)
- Website: harmvandendorpel.com

Harm van den Dorpel (born 1981) is a Berlin-based conceptual artist. His work has been exhibited internationally in Germany, the United States, Italy, United Kingdom and the Netherlands. His broad practice includes the creation of sculpture, collage, computer animation, computer generated graphics and interaction design. In 2015 he co-founded Left Gallery based in Berlin. He is regarded a key figure in Post-Internet art.

== Work ==
In his work, he investigates how algorithms can analyse digital archives and guide the artist in aesthetic decision taking, leading to a symbiosis of man-machine art creation. Using computer programming, he describes traditional notions in art, such as for example the free use of intuition and expression. Conclusions from this research are then fed back in the production of new work. His ultimate goal is to reveal the reasoning structure of his own consciousness, and his implicit associations and assumptions. In this process, he borrows ideas from psychoanalysis, the writing of Jacques Derrida, and Artificial Intelligence (which he studied).

He's had institutional exhibitions at Museum Kurhaus Kleve, the New Museum in New York, The Ullens Center for Contemporary Art in Beijing, China, the Museum of Modern Art, Warsaw, and the Netherlands Media Art Institute, Amsterdam.

In 2015 MAK - Museum of Applied Arts (Vienna) acquired Harm van den Dorpel's screensaver Event Listeners and thereby became the first museum to purchase a work of art using bitcoins.

Between 2006 and 2010 he has been a creative programming teacher and interaction design teacher at private training centres and at the Gerrit Rietveld Art Academie in Amsterdam.

== Solo exhibitions ==
=== 2016 ===
Death Imitates Language at Neumeister Bar-Am, Berlin

=== 2015 ===
IOU at Narrative Projects, London
Just In Time at American Medium, New York
Ambiguity points to the mystery of all revealing at Neumeister Bar-Am, Berlin
Loomer at Young Projects, Los Angeles

=== 2014 ===
Emergent Conclusions – room.thecomposingrooms.com

=== 2013 ===
Release Early, Release Often, Delegate Everything You Can, be Open to the Point of Promiscuity at Abrons Art Center, New York

=== 2012 ===
About at Wilkinson Gallery, London
The Mews Project Space, London
