= Afra, Morocco =

Place in Morocco

Afra افرا
- Location in Morocco
- Coordinates: 30°47′38.62″N 6°17′9.56″W
- Country: Morocco
- Region: Drâa-Tafilalet
- Province: Zagora Province

Population (2014)
  - Total: 8,939
- Time zone: UTC+0 (GMT)
- Postcode: 47076
- Area code: +212

Afra, also spelled as Affra (Arabic: افرا, Tamazight: ⴰⴼⵔⴰ ), is a small village located in the Zagora region in the southern part of Morocco. The village had a population of 8,939 residents in 2014 and is situated around the Draa Valley.

== Local institutions ==
The weekly outdoor market, locally known as a "souk," takes place every Sunday in Affra. It's where the local residents do their shopping.

== See also ==
- List of municipalities, communes, and arrondissements of Morocco
