= Aphra (moth) =

Scientific classification
- Domain: Eukaryota
- Kingdom: Animalia
- Phylum: Arthropoda
- Class: Insecta
- Order: Lepidoptera
- Superfamily: Noctuoidea
- Family: Erebidae
- Subfamily: Arctiinae
- Genus: Aphra; Watson, 1980

Synonyms
- Phara Walker, 1854; Olina Walker, 1869

Genus of moths

Aphra is a genus of moths in the subfamily Arctiinae. The genus was described by Watson in 1980.

== Species ==
- Aphra flavicosta Herrich-Schäffer, 1855
- Aphra nyctemeroides Walker, 1869
- Aphra sanguipalpis Dognin, 1907
- Aphra trivittata Walker, 1854
