= Sander Breure and Witte van Hulzen =

Sander Breure and Witte Van Hulzen are an artist duo and have been collaborating since 2006. The duo is based in the Netherlands. Breure's and Van Hulzen's oeuvre is interdisciplinary and includes various forms of media, such as: performance art, installations, video art, sculptures, photography and illustrations.

== Life ==
Sander Breure was born in Leidendorp in 1985. Breure followed a BA Music Composing at the Royal Conservatory in The Hague and graduated in 2010. Witte Van Hulzen was born in Bolsward in 1984. Van Hulzen followed a BA Fine Arts at ArteZ in Arnhem and graduated in 2009. Besides an artistic duo, Breure and Van Hulzen are cousins. Breure and Van Hulzen have been working together since 2006, starting their artistic collaboration during their studies. At the start of the collaboration between Breure and Van Hulzen, both were interested in choreography, which resulted in the production of dance performances. The dance performances were successfully received by the audience and the duo enjoyed the collaborative approach, which encouraged them to develop their art practices together.

Breure and Van Hulzen became residents at various art studios around the world, including the Rijksakademie in Amsterdam (from 2016 to 2017). During Breure's and Van Hulzen's residency at the Rijksakademie, the duo developed their artistic skills and broadened the implementation of different media forms. Consequently, the duo's work became interdisciplinary and comprises the following: performance art, installations, video art, sculptures, photography and illustrations.

Breure's and Van Hulzen's interdisciplinary artworks are rewarded with artistic nominations and awards. In 2009, the duo received the 'René Coelho Prize' and the 'TENT Academy Award. Thereafter, Breure and Van Hulzen won the category 'Best Propose Award' of the 'New Media Festival' in Seoul in 2016. Subsequently, Breure's and Van Hulzen's work was rewarded with the 'Charlotte Köhler Prize' in 2018. Moreover, Breure and Van Hulzen were nominated for the 'Prix de Rome' in 2019, for which the duo realised the installation Accidents Waiting to Happen.

In addition to the nominations and award, Breure's and Van Hulzen's have been represented in exhibitions since 2006. In 2010, 2012 and 2018, Breure and Van Hulzen exhibited in Tegenboschvanvreden in Amsterdam. Thereafter, the duo created several installation for the house Marres (house of contemporary culture) in Maastricht in 2019. Breure's and Van Hulzen's video art is also screened at various international film festivals, such as the International Film festival Rotterdam and the International Documentary Festival Amsterdam.

== Style ==
A recurring theme in Sander Breure's and Witte Van Hulzen's oeuvre is the observation of human behaviour. Breure and Van Hulzen observe people's reactions in certain situations and consequently reflect those observations in their artworks. Additionally, Breure and Van Hulzen communicate with people through discussions and interviews and therefore the duo tries to empathise and imagine with fellow people's emotions and habits. This sociological approach results in empathy, to strengthen the emotional connection between individuals. Subsequently, the hybrid dynamic between the individual and the society, between the solitary and the masses, is reflected in the artworks and performances.

Most of the Breure's and Van Hulzen's reflective oeuvre is classified as a portrait of social behaviour. The duo applies different media to visualise the portraits, this approach results in Breure's and Van Hulzen's interdisciplinary art practices. Different techniques are combined in the duo's artworks, because of the diversity of knowledge among the two artists, since Breure has a musical background and Van Hulzen has a background in the visual arts. Nevertheless, both Breure and Van Hulzen execute all practices of the artworks and therefore present themselves as a united artistic duo.

Theatre and performance art are recurring disciplines to translate Breure's and Van Hulzen's observations of human behaviour. This approach stimulates the exchange of thoughts and experiences between individual. The duo's interest for theatre and performance art goes back to the beginning of their collaboration, when Breure and Van Hulzen mainly worked on dance performances. The current performances written by Breure and Van Hulzen include a combination of choreography and acted storylines, the scenarios are performed by professional actors, friends and family. The performances take place on location or in the theatre, but are also represented in Breure's and Van Hulzen's video art.

Different disciplines and media are combined within the Breure's and Van Hulzen's performances, which results in installations. Among other things, the installations include self-recorded sound fragments and self-made sculptures. Breure's and Van Hulzen's sculptures portray fellow people, friends and family. The collage-like sculptures are constructed from various materials, such as old rags, plaster and (scrap) wood, resulting in robust and expressive sculptures. Within the scenario's, the sculptures are combined with actors, to question the blurring boundaries between people and objects.

== Artworks ==
=== Ebedi Dönüş (2010) ===
Breure and Van Hulzen produced Ebedi Dönüş (Eternal Return) during their residency at the Garanti Platform in Istanbul. The video performance is inspired by the infinitive soap operas from Turkey. According to Breure's and Van Hulzen's research, the infinitive character of the soap operas results in circular stories, which is shown in Ebedi Dönüş. The circularity is approached by the scenario, which constantly repeats the same sentences. The video shows three intertwined stories; the first story narrates the return of a soldier embracing his mother and sisters, the second storyline narrates that of a widow that contacts her deceased husband through a television medium and the third story visualises an argument between two lovers. All characters are acted by professional Turkish actors in on a minimalist and cubic grey set. Moreover, Ebedi Dönüş becomes a soap opera by the use of baroque music that accompanies the video. This video was screened at the 'International Film Festival Rotterdam' in 2011 and at the film festival 'The Migrant (Moving) Image' in Rotterdam in 2016.

=== The Shores of an Island I Only Skirted (2012) ===
The Shores of an Island I Only Skirted is a fourteen-minute video artwork that consists of one screen that tells two stories, a story on each side of the screen. On the one side of the screen, a calm clip portrays the island of Utøya that was attacked by Anders Breivik two years earlier in 2011. On the other side of the screen, restless and low-resolution video fragments are edited in a fourteen-minute clip. The restless video fragments of refugees are connected to the calm portrait of Utøya by the sound composition, which consists of self-recorded sounds and quotes. The sound composition emphasises the ambiguous utopian ideals of the island of Utøya and Europe at the same time. The Shores of an Island I Only Skirted was on display at Tegenboschvanvreden in 2012 and was screened at the 'International Film Festival Rotterdam' in 2013.

=== Het Familie Portret (2014) ===
Het Familie Portret (the family portray) is a documentary performance that reflects the general Dutch domestic sphere. In Het Familie Portret a father, mother, daughter and son play an average day in a Dutch family but during the performance there is no interaction between the actors. The scenario for Het Familie Portret is based on Breure's and Van Hulzen's observation of an average family and the Dutch Central Office of Statistics' registered information about Dutch families. The performance is accompanied by self-recorded sounds that represent the domestic sphere of Dutch example family. Het Familie Portret was first performed at the Stedelijk Museum Amsterdam in 2014. Breure and Van Hulzen also designed a set for Het Familie Portret that consists of abstract representations of everyday objects. The installation A Living Room derived from the set of Het Familie Portret and was exhibited at the Stedelijk Museum Amsterdam in 2014.

=== How Can we Know the Dancer from the Dance? (2016) ===
Breure and Van Hulzen created the choreography for How Can we Know the Dancer from the Dance? inspired by people's habits while waiting at a train station. In 2016, four actors at Utrecht Central Station performed the choreography synchronously. Due to the crowded train station and people's rush, the performance was not always noticed. Nevertheless, when the viewer notices the choreography, the viewer cannot deny the performance anymore. According to Breure and Van Hulzen, because of the lengthy performance, the dancers can be perceived as sculptures. The performance How Can we Know the Dancer from the Dance? was produced for the art project 'Public Works' in 2016. Within this project, various artists created works of art that interact with visitors of Utrecht Central Station, such as Breure's and Van Hulzen's choreography.

=== The Floor is Lava (2019) ===
In 2019, house Marres (house of contemporary culture) in Maastricht, invited Breure and Van Hulzen to exhibit at their venue. Consequently, the duo designed the interdisciplinary multimedia exhibition/installation The Floor is Lava. All rooms of house Marres staged different installations, which include sculptures, drawing and photography. The installations represent the people's daily live through different media. The purpose of The Floor is Lava is to represent all the roles people play in normal situations and therefore each room of house Marres looks different. Moreover, Breure and Van Hulzen refer to the child's play 'the floor is lava', in which the floor dissolves imaginary, to express the dissolution of human control over life. Breure and Van Hulzen wrote a scenario for The Floor is Lava that was performed twice during their exhibition at house Marres. The performance represented general and useless human habits, which was acted by actors, family and friends. Photographer Petra Stavast documented the performances in the book On Gestures Of Doing Nothing, which explores the habits of doing nothing.

=== Accidents Waiting to Happen (2019) ===
Breure and Van Hulzen created the multimedia installation Accidents Waiting to Happen at the Stedelijk Museum Amsterdam for their nomination for the 'Prix de Rome' in 2019. The subject matter of this installation presents the parallel between the museum and the hospital. According to Breure and Van Hulzen, the museum and the hospital have similarities; within both institutions the white clinical spaces represent human knowledge and contemplation. People's habits at the hospital are translated into the installation and therefore moved to the museum. Accidents Waiting to Happen is exhibited in a bright white and cubic space, filled with sculptures that depict doctors and patients. Additionally, medical cameras record the museum's visitors and the visitors thus become actors of Accidents Waiting to Happen. A performance written by Breure and Van Hulzen for Accidents Waiting To Happen translated human behaviour in a hospital to a play that consequently questions the vulnerability of people. Within Accidents Waiting to Happen, Breure and Van Hulzen pay attention for the second time to the parallel between the museum and the hospital, since they also focused on this topic in their installation The Waiting Room for the 'RijksakademieOpen' in 2017.

== Awards and nominations ==
- 2019 - Prix de Rome (nomination)
- 2018 - Charlotte Köhler Prize
- 2016 - Best Propose Award, New Media Festival Seoul
- 2015 - Volkskrant Beeldende Kunstprijs (nomination)
- 2009 - TENT Academy Awards
- 2009 - René Coelho Prize
