= Colette Inez =

American poet

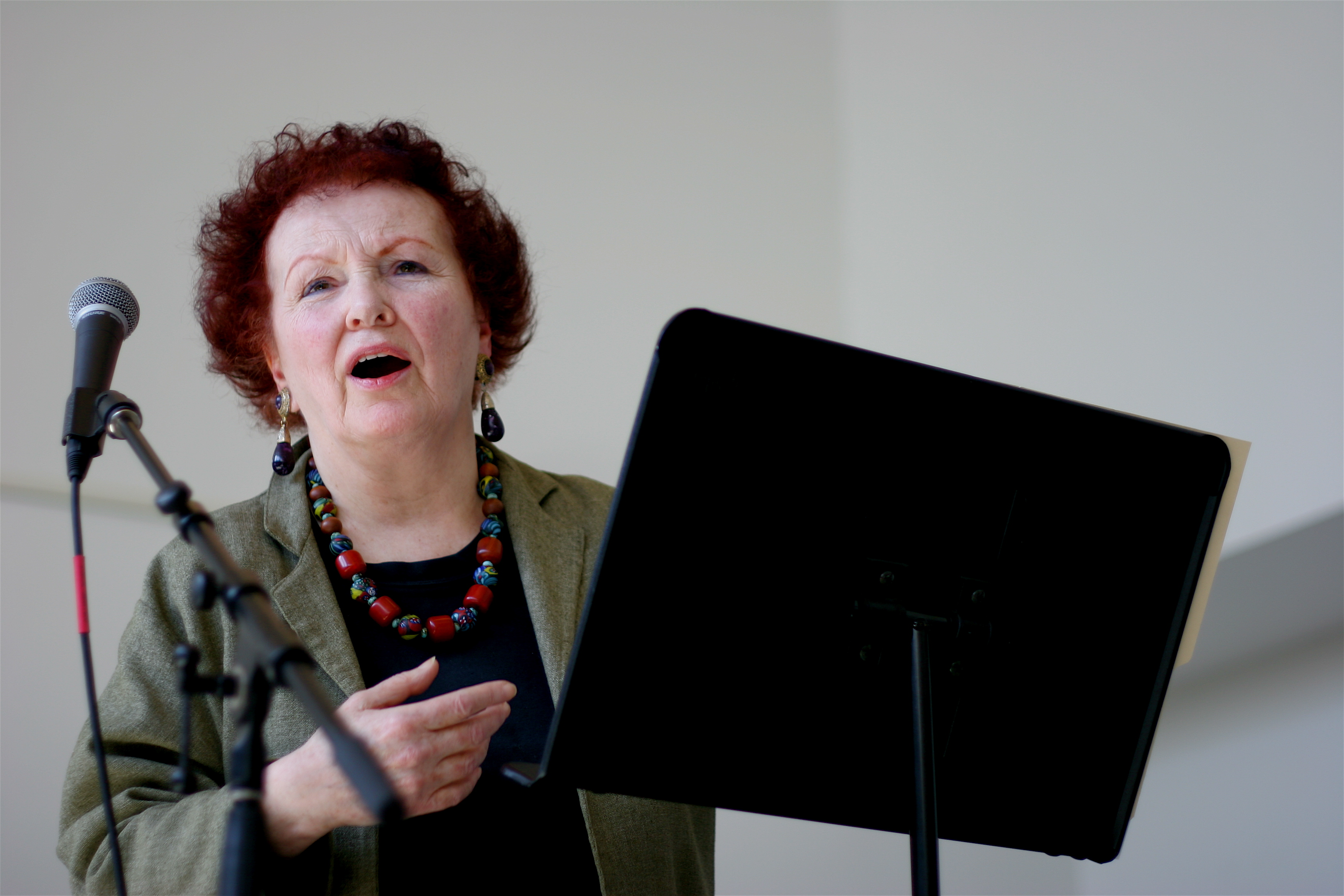
- Inez reading her poetry at Juilliard
- Born: June 3, 1931; Brussels, Belgium
- Died: January 16, 2018 (aged 86)
- Education: Hunter College
- Occupation(s): poet, academic
- Employer: Columbia University (1983–present)

Colette Inez (June 3, 1931 – January 16, 2018) was an American poet and a faculty member at Columbia University’s Undergraduate Writing Program. She published ten poetry collections and won the Guggenheim Fellowship, Rockefeller Fellowship, and two National Endowment for the Arts (NEA Fellowships) and two Prizes and many other awards. Her memoir, The Secret of M. Dulong, was released in 2008 by The University of Wisconsin Press.

== Early life and education ==
Born on June 23, 1931, as the love child of a French scholar and a French-American priest in Brussels, Colette Inez spent her early years in a Belgian Catholic orphanage, arriving in America as a pretended orphan at age eight at the start of World War II. Her adolescence was spent under the foster care of an alcoholic and abusive family in Long Island, New York.

She graduated from Hunter College.

== Career ==
Sidelights, angels, fifes and harps
Aha, aha
it's no ordinary morning
Brother Love has gone for logs...
("Gospels in the Drifts")

— Colette Inez

Her first book, The Woman Who Loved Worms (1972), was adapted into a dance performance by the Saeko Ichinohe Dance Company. Five of her poems were used as the lyrics of a song cycle, Miz Inez Sez, featured on Pulitzer Prize winning composer David Del Tredici’s album Secret Music (2002): "Alive and Taking Names," "The Happy Child," "Good News! Nilda is Back," and "Chateauneuf du Pape, the Pope's Valet Speaks" (all from her 1993 collection Getting Under Way: New and Selected Poems), as well as "The Beckoning" (first published in the New Orleans Review in 1999).

She has taught at Bucknell University, Ohio University, Denison University, State University of New York (Stony Brook), Hunter College, University of Tennessee (Knoxville), The New School and started teaching at Columbia University in 1983 starting the Columbia University School of General Studies and subsequently as a lecturer in the university's Undergraduate Writing Program.

Colette continued writing and reciting poetry up until her death. She died on January 16, 2018.

== Works ==
- The Woman Who Loved Worms, Doubleday, 1972.
- Alive and Taking Names. Ohio University Press, 1977.
- Eight Minutes from the Sun. Saturday Press, 1983.
- Family Life, Story Line Press, 1992
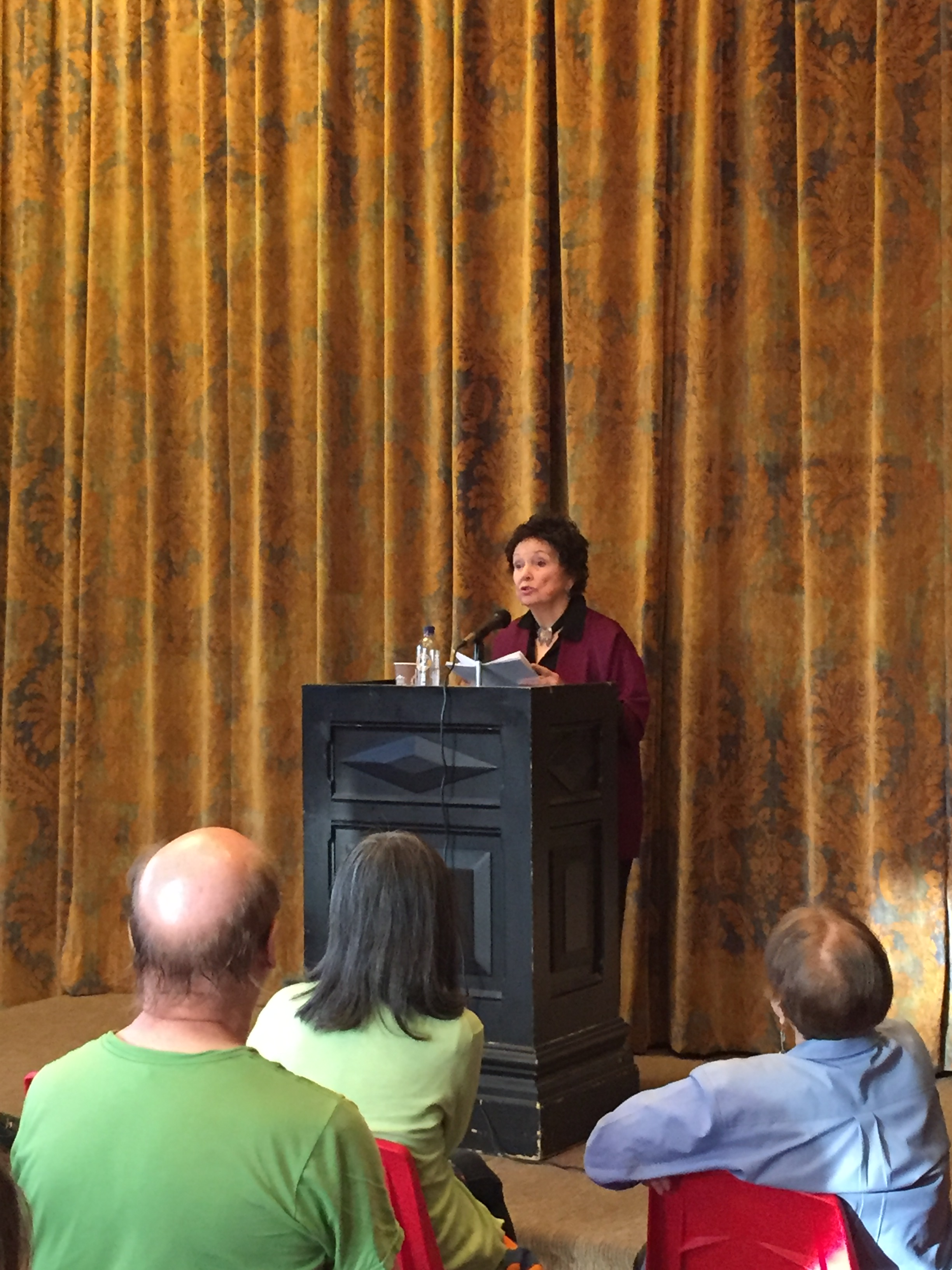
- Colette Inez reads her poetry at Jefferson Market Library. June 28, 2017. Photo by Patrick Neuman.
  Getting Underway: New & Selected Poetry, Story Line Press, 1993.
- Naming the Moons. Press of Appletree Alley, 1994.
- Clemency, Carnegie Mellon University Press, 1998.
- Spinoza Doesn't Come Here Anymore, Melville House Publishing, 2004. ISBN 978-0-9749609-1-3.
- The Secret of M. Dulong, University of Wisconsin Press, 2005. ISBN 0-299-21420-6.Excerpts
- For Reasons of Music

== Awards ==
- 1985: Guggenheim Fellowship
