= Rachel Townsend =

Itv news North of England, correspondent

Rachel Townsend (née Phillips) is a journalist, news reporter and relief presenter for ITV news programme Granada Reports. Up until mid-2008 she worked as a reporter and presenter for ITV news programme Calendar but due to ITV regional news cutbacks she was relocated to Granada based in Manchester. However, she is originally from Liverpool and not Yorkshire. As of 2014, Townsend splits her time between Granada Reports, and ITV News Calendar (technically marking her return to Calendar).

Townsend had not been on-air since September 2014. But she eventually returned to Granada Reports as a stand-in presenter on 1 December 2015. As of 2017 she frequently files reports for Granada Reports.
