= Afra Eisma =

Dutch artist (born 1993)

- Born: 1993; The Hague

Afra Eisma (born 1993) is a Dutch artist who creates ceramics and textile installations using vibrant colors and encompassing cartoonish alien beings, sometimes accompanied by music. Her work invites interaction with the viewer.

She was educated at the Royal Academy of Art, The Hague and went on to study in London at Central Saint Martins. Her first museum solo exhibition was at the Fries Museum in 2021. Eisma opened her solo exhibition 'splashdown tender' in 2023 at The Tetley in Leeds. In 2025 her work can be seen at Amsterdam Airport Schiphol in a temporary gallery featuring Dutch artists adjoining the main hall.

Eisma has said that her art addresses shame.

== Exhibitions ==
Eisma's work has had solo exhibitions among which:

- 2025 Institute Contemporary Art, San Diego
- 2024 dandelions milk, No Man’s Art Gallery, Amsterdam
- 2023 Hop to Hope, Wälnö Aaltosen Museo, Turku
- 2023 Splashdown Tetley, The Tetley, Leeds
- 2021 your silence will not protect you, Fries Museum, Leeuwarden
- NL 2020 Feline Whispers, 1646, The Hague
