= Aldwych House =

Coordinates: 51.513464°N 0.115881°W

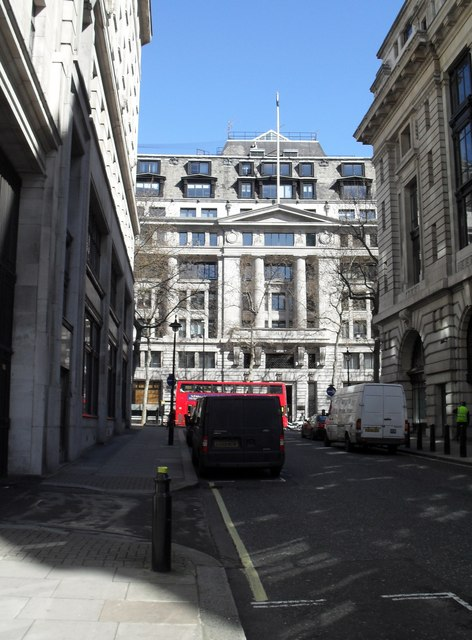
Aldwych House as seen from Montreal Place

Aldwych House is an Edwardian style office block in Aldwych, London. It sits on the eastern curve of the crescent.

== History ==
The Aldwych along with the Kingsway were together part of a large metropolitan redevelopment scheme by the London County Council completed in 1905. Along both roads are a number of large Edwardian office blocks constructed as part of the development.

Aldwych house was itself built after the First World War to the designs of Gunton & Gunton as offices for the Agricultural & General Engineers. Its design displays a bold fronted neoclassical facade with robust Doric columns.

The building was refurbished in the 2010s, hosting a branch of the Japanese restaurant chain Roka from 2014. In 2017, it was sold to Leong On Kei for around £250 million.

== See also ==
- Aldwych
- 61 Aldwych
- LSE Clement House
- 1 Kingsway
