= Elizabeth Bowes (disambiguation) =

Elizabeth Bowes (1505 – c. 1572) was an English Protestant.

Elizabeth Bowes, Elizabeth Bowe, or Elisabeth Bowes may also refer to:

- Betty Castor (born 1941), American educator and politician born Elizabeth Bowe
- Elisabeth Bowes, Australian diplomat
- Queen Elizabeth the Queen Mother (1900–2002), consort of George VI and born Elizabeth Bowes-Lyon

== See also ==
- Elizabeth Bowen (1899–1973), Anglo-Irish writer
- Elizabeth Bower (born 1976), English actress
- Elisabeth Bowers (born 1949), Canadian writer
- Bowes (disambiguation)
