= Alexander George Robertson Mackenzie =

Scottish architect (1879–1963)

Alexander George Robertson Mackenzie (12 March 1879 – 20 March 1963) was a Scottish architect.

== Early life ==
Born in Aberdeen on 12 March 1879, AGR was the second son of Marshall Mackenzie, architect and his wife, Phoebe Ann Robertson Cooper. He was educated at Gray's School of Art and Aberdeen University and articled to his father in August 1894.

== Professional life ==
At the end of his apprenticeship in 1898, he became his father's chief assistant. From 1900, to gain London experience, he worked in the office of Colonel Edis (1839–1927), and studied at the Architectural Association and the Central School of Arts and Crafts. He gained further experience working with René Sergent in Paris and in the London office of Niven & Wigglesworth, before returning to his father's office as a partner in 1902.

AGR was put in charge of a new London office, but continued to spend some time in Aberdeen. The London practice was an immediate success, with commissions for the Waldorf Astoria Hotel in Aldwych and a more prestigious one for Canada House (which was cancelled during World War I). Australia House, also in Aldwych, followed a few years later and was built.

In the 1920s, AGR spent much of his time in the Aberdeen office, where his father was assisted by John Gibb Marr (1890–1983), who was taken into partnership in 1927. The Aberdeen practice remained prosperous, with much conservation work – the main client was the National Trust for Scotland. However, the London practice did not recover its pre-war success. After being restructured several times, 'A Marshall Mackenzie & Son' closed the London office. Mackenzie and his wife moved to Bourtie House, a fine Georgian house, near Inverurie. In Aberdeen he designed the Art Deco style Northern Hotel which was built in 1937–8, retrieved Provost Ross' House from ruin (now part of the Maritime Museum). and the Capitol Cinema. Mackenzie remained in partnership with John Gibb Marr until AGR retired completely in 1960.

== Personal life ==
During the First World War, AGR enlisted in the London Scottish Regiment and was severely wounded, losing most of a leg. Invalided out, he returned to work with his father. He died on 20 March 1963, after major surgery and is buried at Bourtie churchyard.

== Honours ==
AGR was admitted ARIBA in 1901 and elevated to FRIBA in 1913.
