= Alexander Marshall Mackenzie =

Scottish architect (1848–1933)

- Born: 1 January 1848; Elgin, Moray
- Died: 4 May 1933 (aged 85)
- Education: Aberdeen University
- Occupation: architect
- Known for: buildings in North Scotland
- Spouse: Phoebe Ann Robertson Cooper
- Children: Alexander George Robertson Mackenzie, Gilbert Marshall Mackenzie
- Parents: Thomas Mackenzie (father); Helen Margaret McInnes (mother)

Alexander Marshall MacKenzie (1 January 1848 – 4 May 1933) was a Scottish architect responsible for prestigious projects including the headquarters of the Isle of Man Banking Company in Douglas, and Australia House and the Waldorf Hotel in London.

He received royal patronage with the design of Crathie Kirk (1893) and was subsequently chosen by the Duke and Duchess of Fife (the Prince of Wales's daughter Princess Louise) for the new (3rd) Mar Lodge (1895).

== Early life ==
Born in Elgin in Moray, on 1 January 1848, the son of Thomas Mackenzie, architect, and his wife Helen Margaret McInnes. He was educated at Aberdeen University and trained with James Matthews (1820–98) in Aberdeen from 1863 to 1868. He began his career in the office of David Bryce in Edinburgh.

== Professional life ==
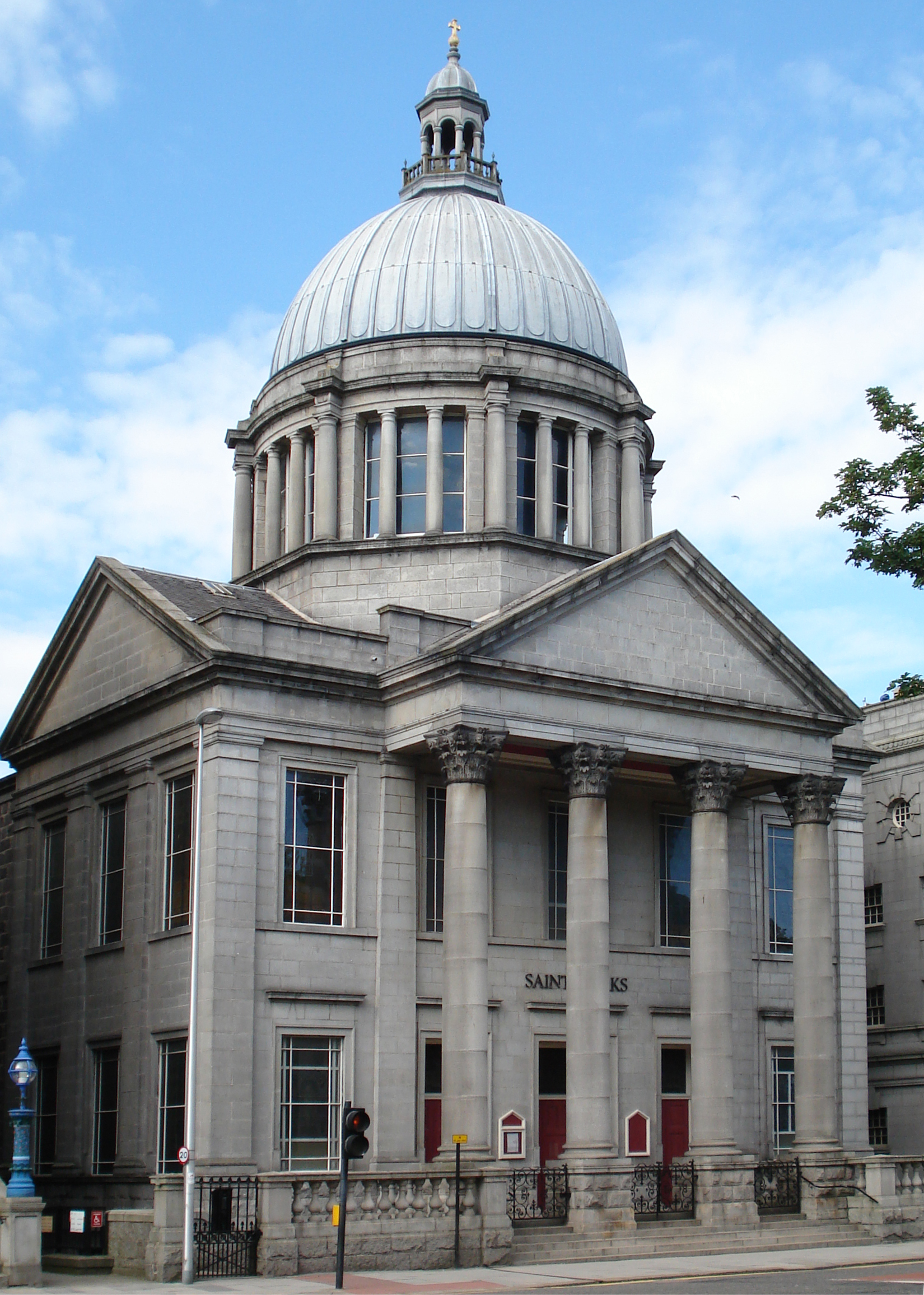
St Mark's Church in Aberdeen.

In 1877 he went into partnership in Aberdeen with James Matthews, and later with his own son. The majority of his work was undertaken in northern Scotland. In Aberdeen his work includes St Mark's Church on Rosemount Viaduct (1892), Elphinstone Hall (1926) at King's College, the Aberdeen Art Gallery (1885), the frontage of Marischal College (1904–6) and the neighbouring Greyfriars Church (1906), Harbour Offices (Regent Quay), and Langstane Kirk (or West Church of St Andrew). The design of Gray’s School of Art and Aberdeen Art Gallery was inspired by Mackenzie’s time studying in Italy (1883). English Gothic architecture is evident in Mackenzie's churches at Craigiebuckler and Ruthrieston, while Powis Church is in Scots Gothic style.

During 1895 Mackenzie undertook extensive internal restoration work at Udny Parish Church. The building's structure, which was designed by John Smith in 1821, was not altered but the roof was replaced.

In 1907 Mackenzie was responsible for widening the Union Bridge and, in 1921, the War Memorial and Cowdray Hall.

In Elgin he designed many public buildings, churches and schools, including the Elgin Town Hall, which burned down in 1939 and was not rebuilt, and the old Scottish Town House. He made an extension to Banff Academy (1898) and additions to Rothiemay Castle (1902 and 1912). He built Coull House, a grand home for himself at Aboyne.

Further afield, he was responsible for prestigious projects including

- the Isle of Man Banking Company in Douglas, Isle of Man
- Australia House and the Waldorf Hotel in London
- Hursley House, near Winchester, Hampshire.

He received royal patronage with the design of Crathie Kirk (1893) and was subsequently chosen by the Duke and Duchess of Fife (the Prince of Wales's daughter Princess Louise) for the new (3rd) Mar Lodge (1895) and St Ninian's Chapel, Braemar.

== Personal life ==
Mackenzie married Phoebe Ann Robertson Cooper, the only daughter of Elgin lawyer, Alexander Cooper, of Cooper & Wink. She was a granddaughter of General George Duncan Robertson, head of the Clan Robertson. Their eldest son, Alexander George Robertson Mackenzie, was also a prominent architect. A younger son, Gilbert Marshall Mackenzie (1890 or 1891 – 21 April 1916), also an architect, was called up and commissioned in the Seaforth Highlanders, and was killed in action near Kut.

Alexander Marshall Mackenzie continued working until within a week of his death on 4 May 1933.

== Honours ==
Mackenzie was elected RSA Associate in 1893, and admitted into FRIBA in 1896. He received an honorary LL.D. in 1906, marking the final completion of the Marischal College extension scheme.
