= 1 Kingsway =

Office block in London, England

Coordinates: 51.513404°N 0.118323°W

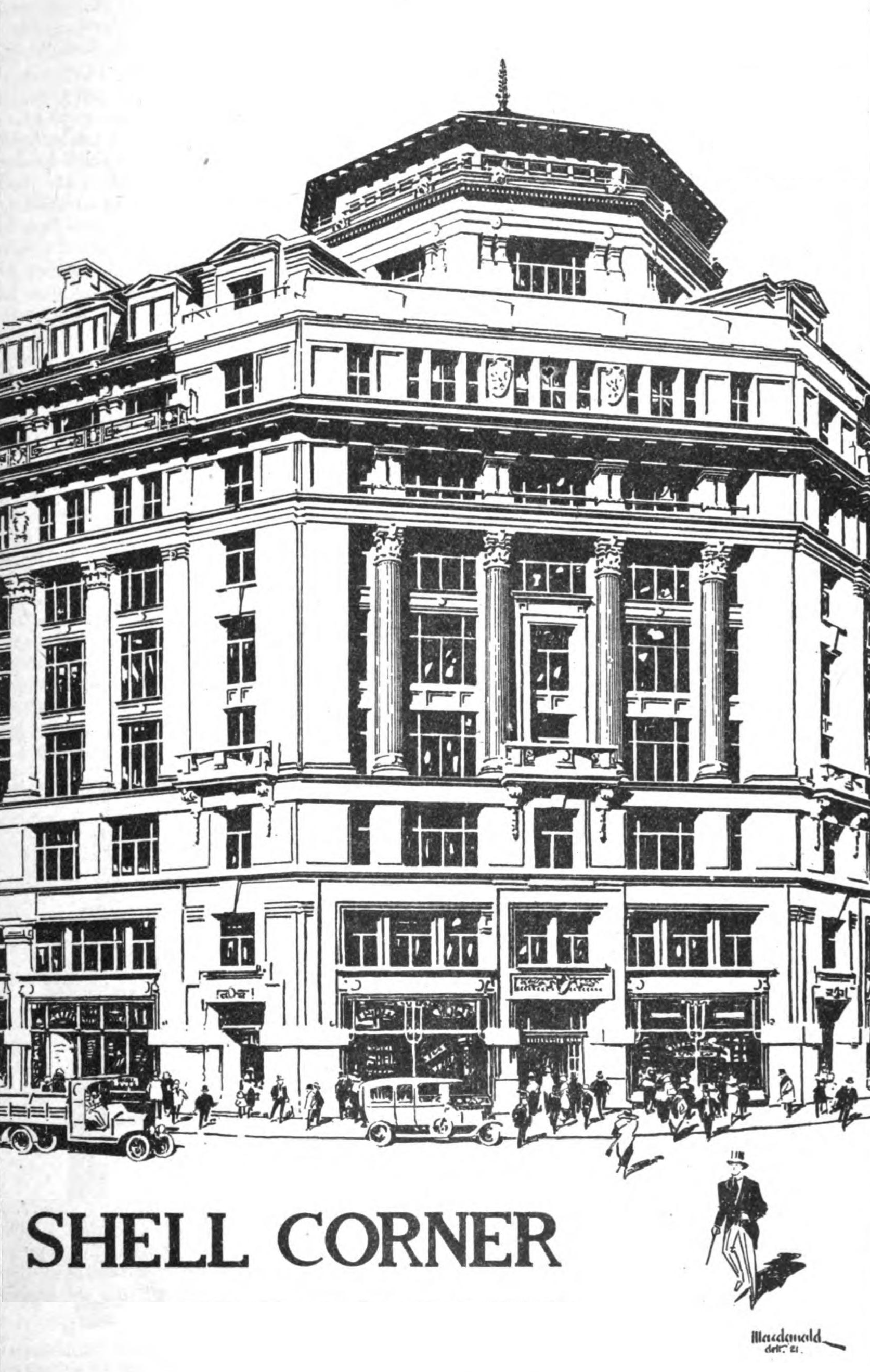
1921 illustration of Shell Corner

1 Kingsway formerly known as Shell Corner is an office block in Aldwych, London. Together with 61 Kingsway it forms the southern gateway of the Kingsway.

== History ==
The Aldwych and Kingsway were together part of a large metropolitan redevelopment scheme by the London County Council. Aldwych forming a crescent in the south connects to Kingsway, a large avenue bounded by a number of large Edwardian office blocks.

Shell Corner and its parallel, nearly symmetrically designed 61 Kingsway would form the southern terminus of the new road. Both were designed before the First World War but construction would only begin on Shell Corner, the western block, following the war. It would be completed in 1922 by Trehearne and Norman, behind a number of blocks on Kingsway, with Thomas Tait the main architect.

The building was refurbished in the 21st century, with the facade maintained.

== See also ==
- Aldwych
- Kingsway
- 61 Aldwych
