= High Commission of Australia, London =

Diplomatic mission of Australia in the United Kingdom

High Commission of Australia in London
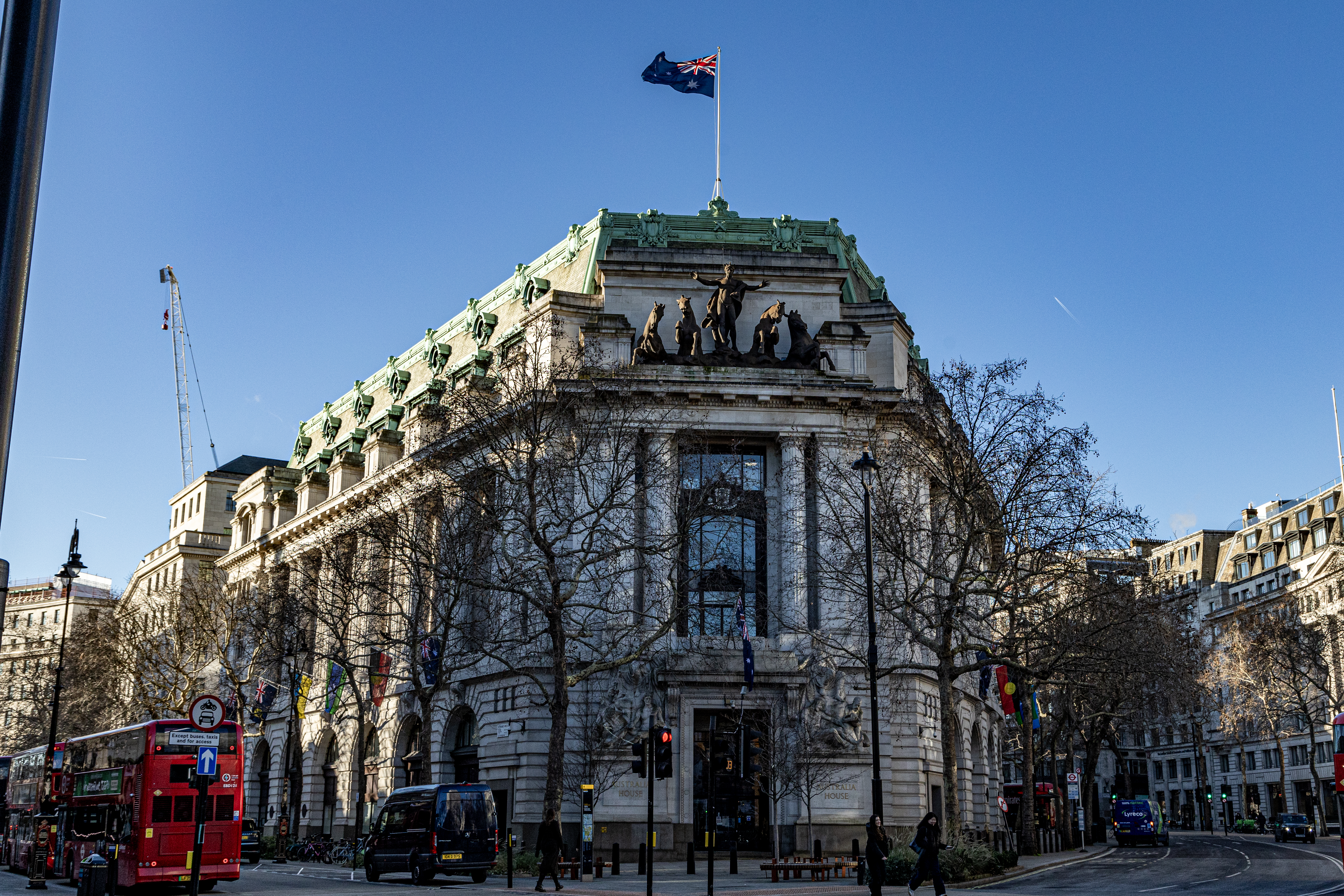
- Location: Aldwych, London, WC2
- Address: Strand, London
- Coordinates: 51°30′46.4″N 0°6′56.6″W
- High Commissioner: Stephen Smith
- Deputy High Commissioner: Elisabeth Bowes

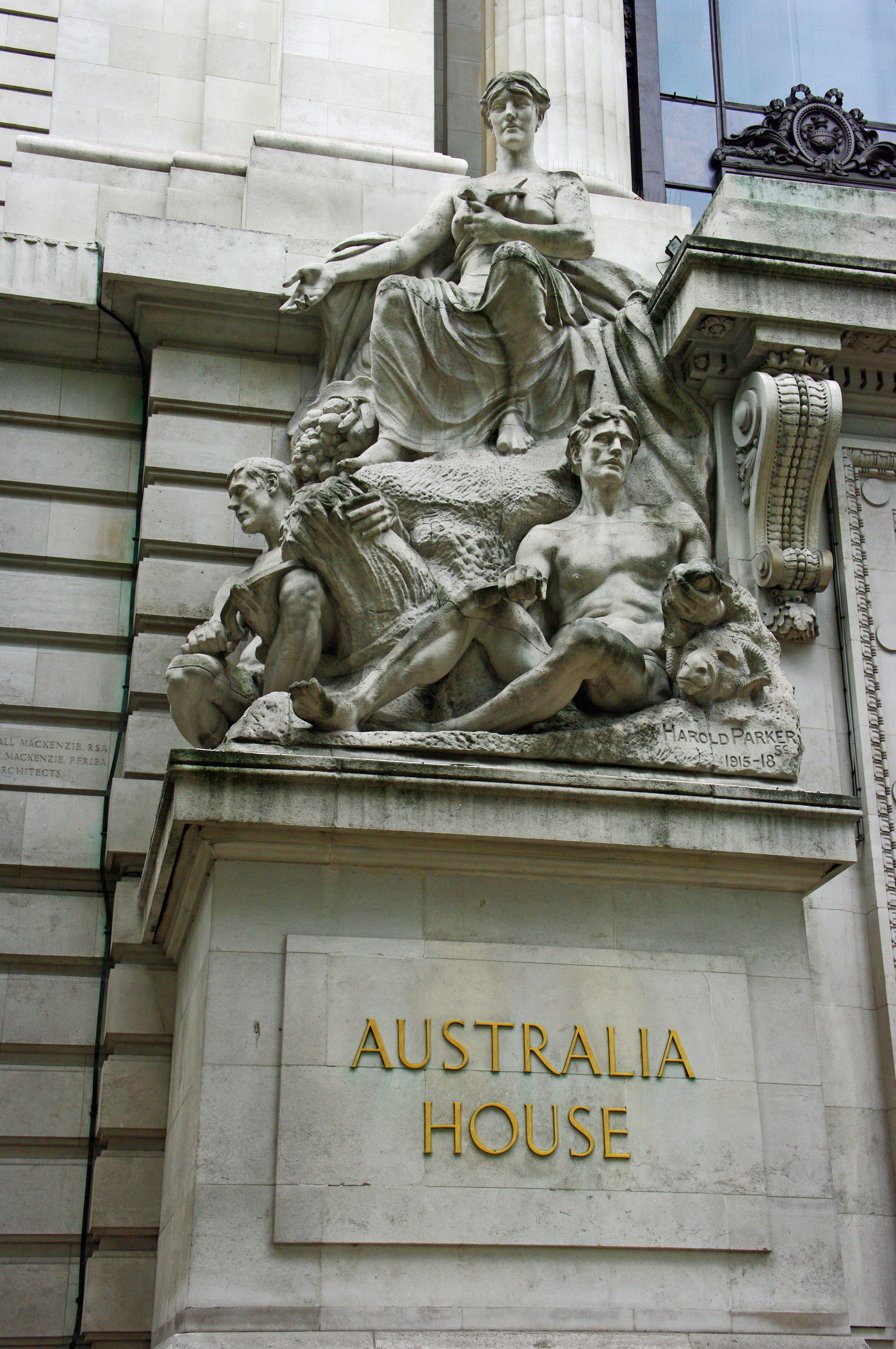
The Prosperity of Australia, Australia House, by Harold Parker (1915-1918)

The High Commission of Australia in London is the diplomatic mission of Australia in the United Kingdom. It is located in Australia House, a Grade II listed building. It was Australia's first diplomatic mission and is the longest continuously occupied diplomatic mission in the United Kingdom.

== History ==
A major landmark on the Strand, London, construction on the building by the Dove Brothers commenced in 1913, but shipping problems caused by the First World War delayed completion. It was officially opened by King George V in a ceremony on 3 August 1918 attended by the Australian Prime Minister William Morris Hughes. The cost of the triangular shaped land was £379,756 (£37,503,000 in 2025) when purchased by the Commonwealth of Australia in 1912 and building and other associated costs brought total expenditure to about £1 million. The building was designed by British architects, Alexander Marshall Mackenzie and his son, Alexander George Robertson Mackenzie following an architectural competition, the judges of which included Bertram Mackennal, John Longstaff, George Washington Lambert, Fred Leist and Arthur Streeton. The Commonwealth of Australia's chief architect, John Smith Murdoch, travelled to London to work with the Mackenzie firm on the building.

Although an Official Secretary had been appointed to London as early as 1906, the High Commission to London was the first Australian diplomatic mission and one of the most prominent in London.

The building itself was built over a 900-year-old sacred well drawing from the River Fleet, a subterranean London river. The water in the well is clear and has been tested as safe to drink.

== Construction ==
Much of the building materials used in its construction were imported from Australia. The building is of Portland stone on a base of Australian trachyte. The marbles used include dove-coloured Buchan marble from Victoria, the light and dark Caleula from New South Wales, and white Angaston marble from South Australia. The joinery and flooring timbers include timber varieties from all Australian States but the most prominent of these is black bean, a very hard and dense wood similar to English oak, used principally for panels of the first floor Downer Room where the carvings represent arts and sciences. This work is credited to Messrs Wylie & Lockhead of London and Glasgow.

== Modern use ==
Government agencies within the High Commission include Austrade, Defence, Materiel (CONDMAT), National Library of Australia and Public Affairs/Media/Cultural. The building's grand interior was used as the setting of Gringotts Wizarding Bank in Harry Potter and the Philosopher's Stone, as well as scenes in 2017's Wonder Woman.

== Elections ==
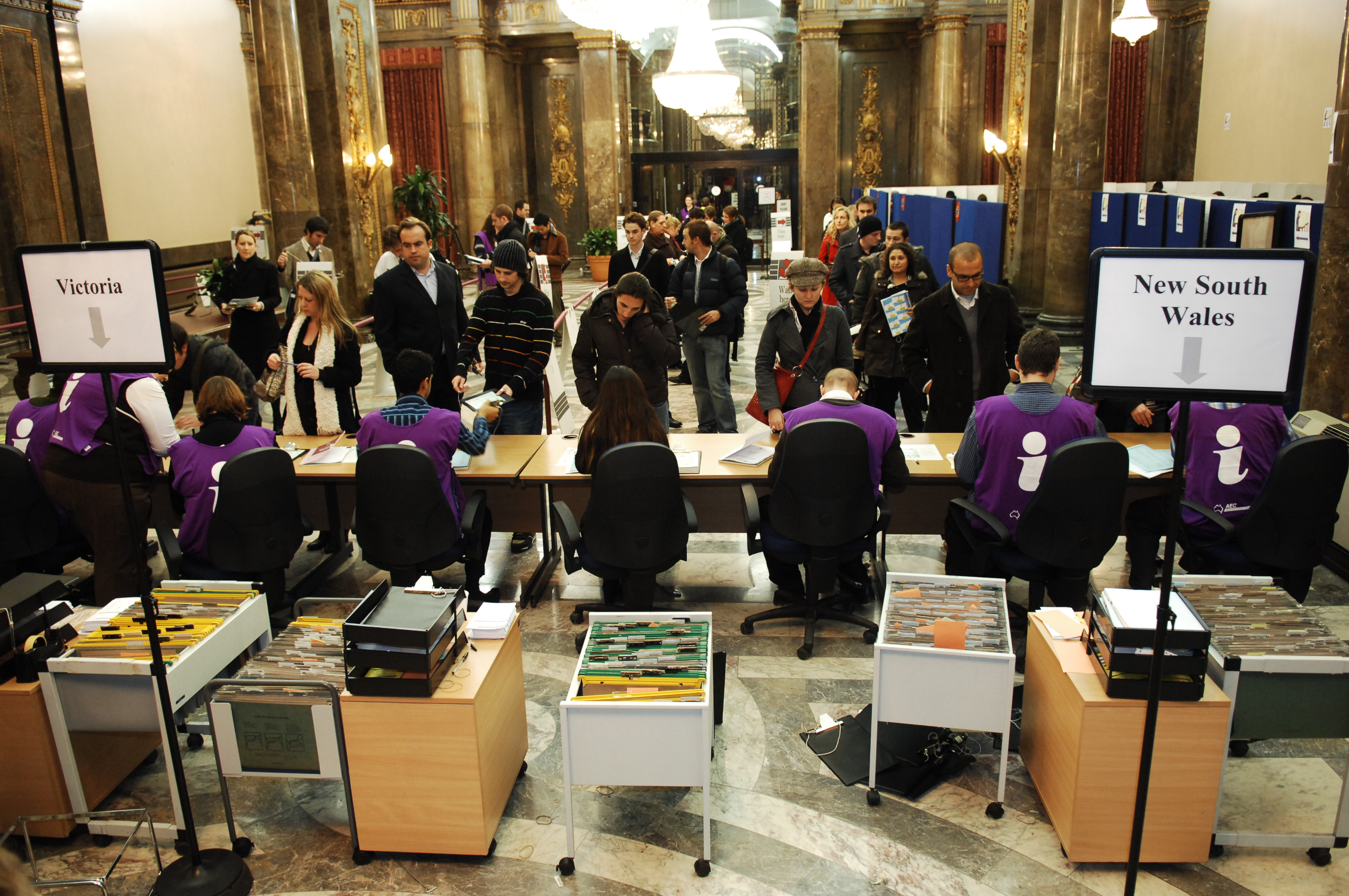
Voters at Australia House for the 2007 Australian election

Australia House is usually the single largest polling station in Australian federal elections, with more votes being cast at the London polling station than at any polling station in any of the Australian states or territories.

== Gallery ==
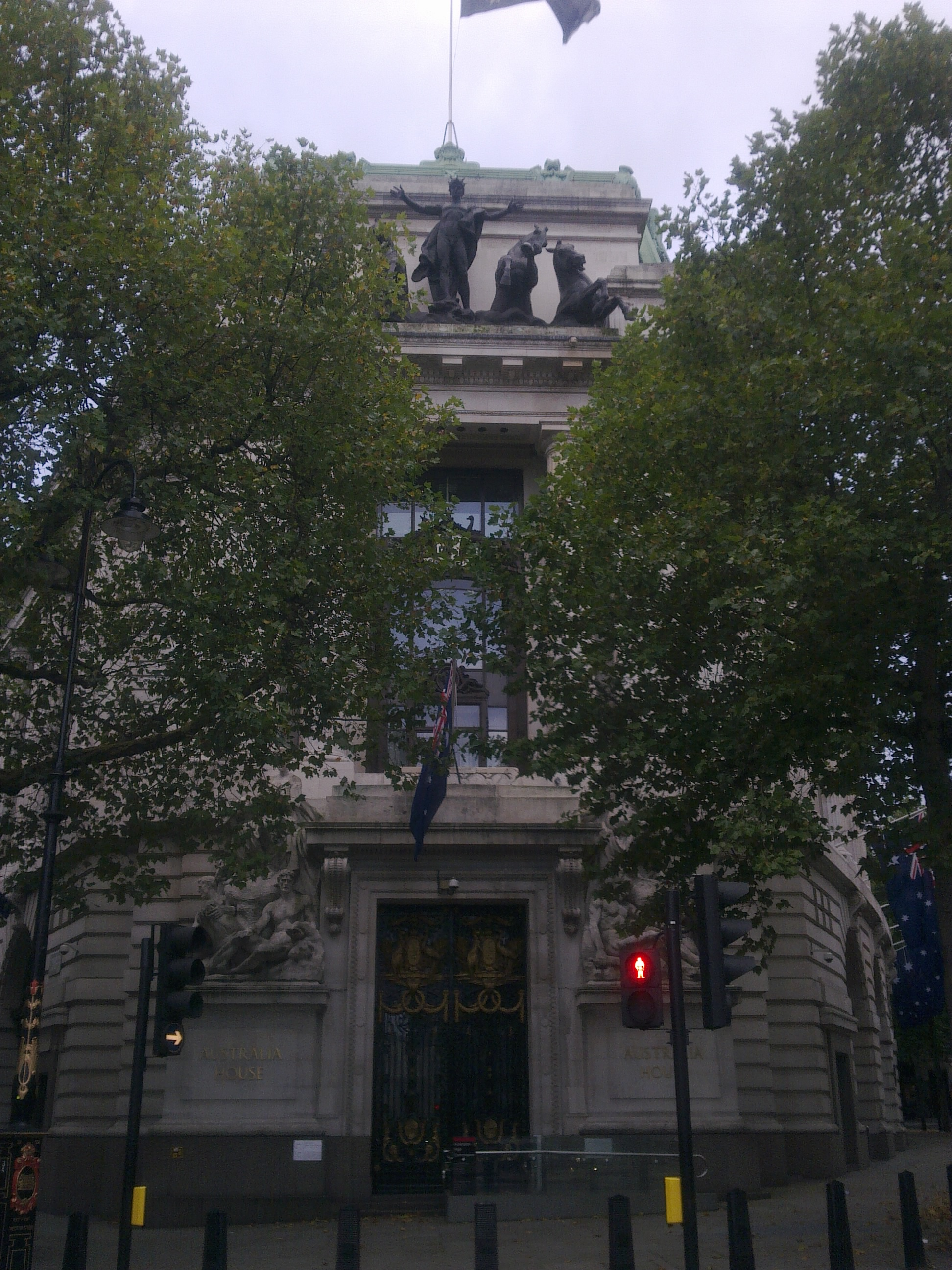
The entrance to the High Commission

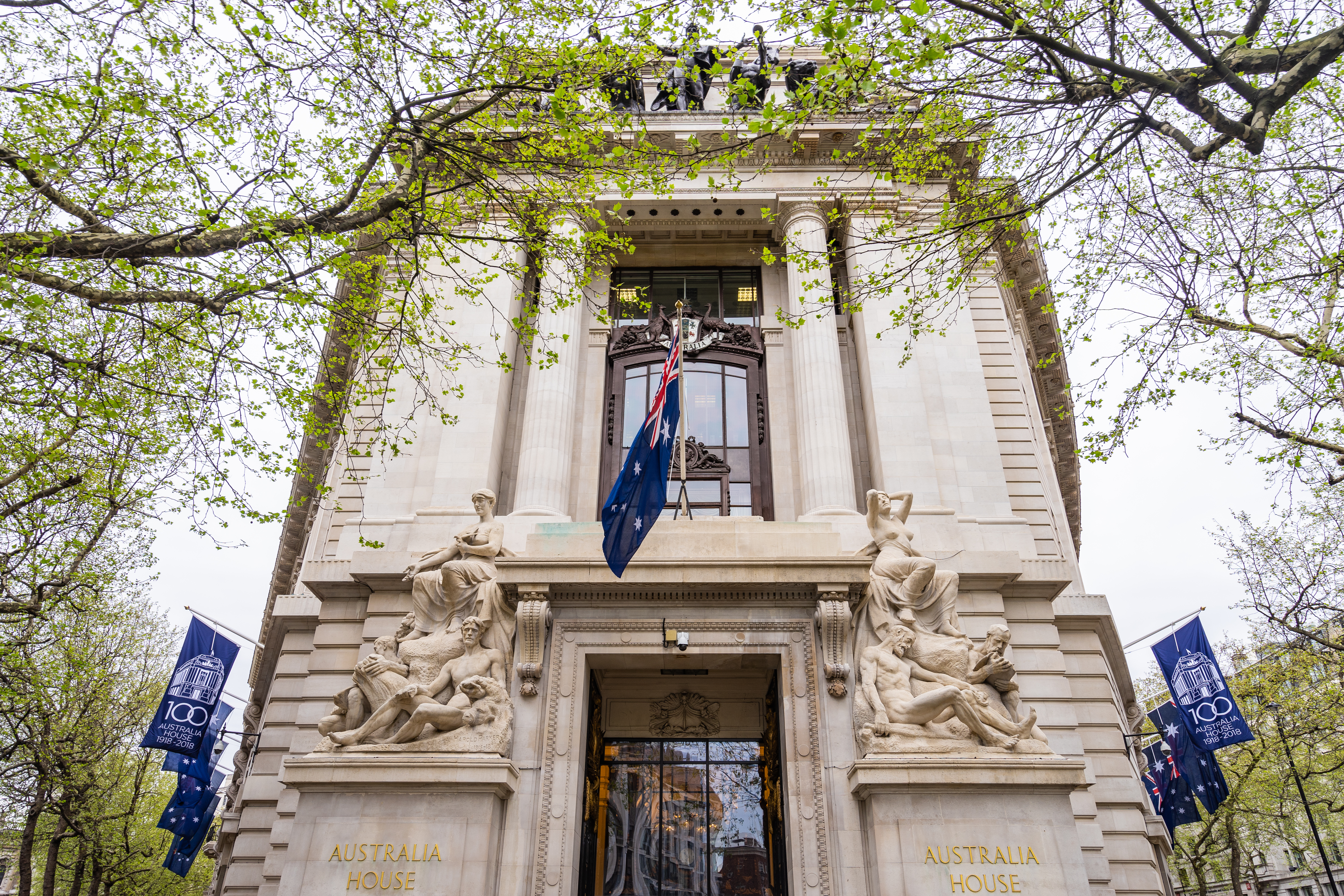
Close-up of the entrance

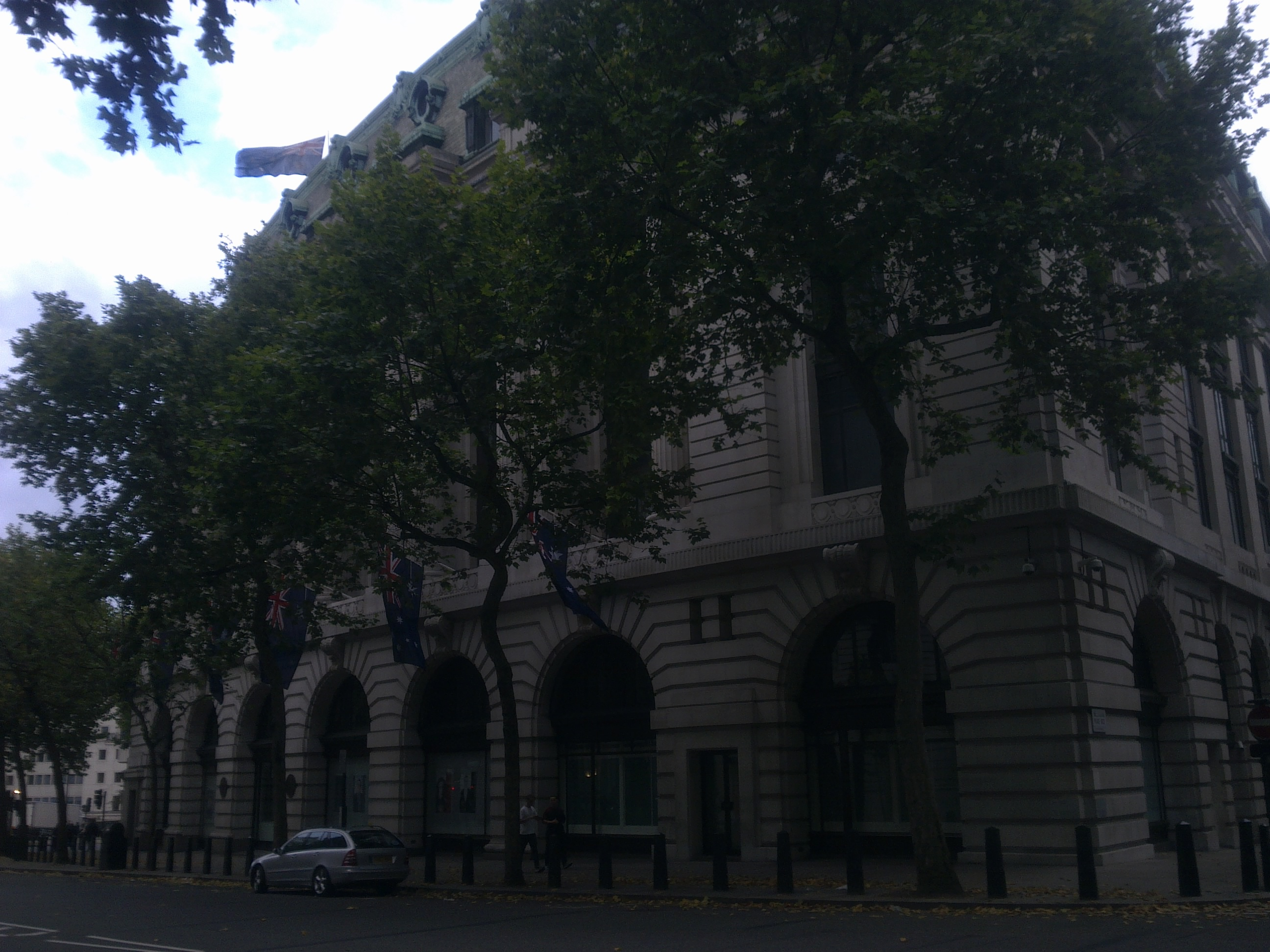
View from Aldwych

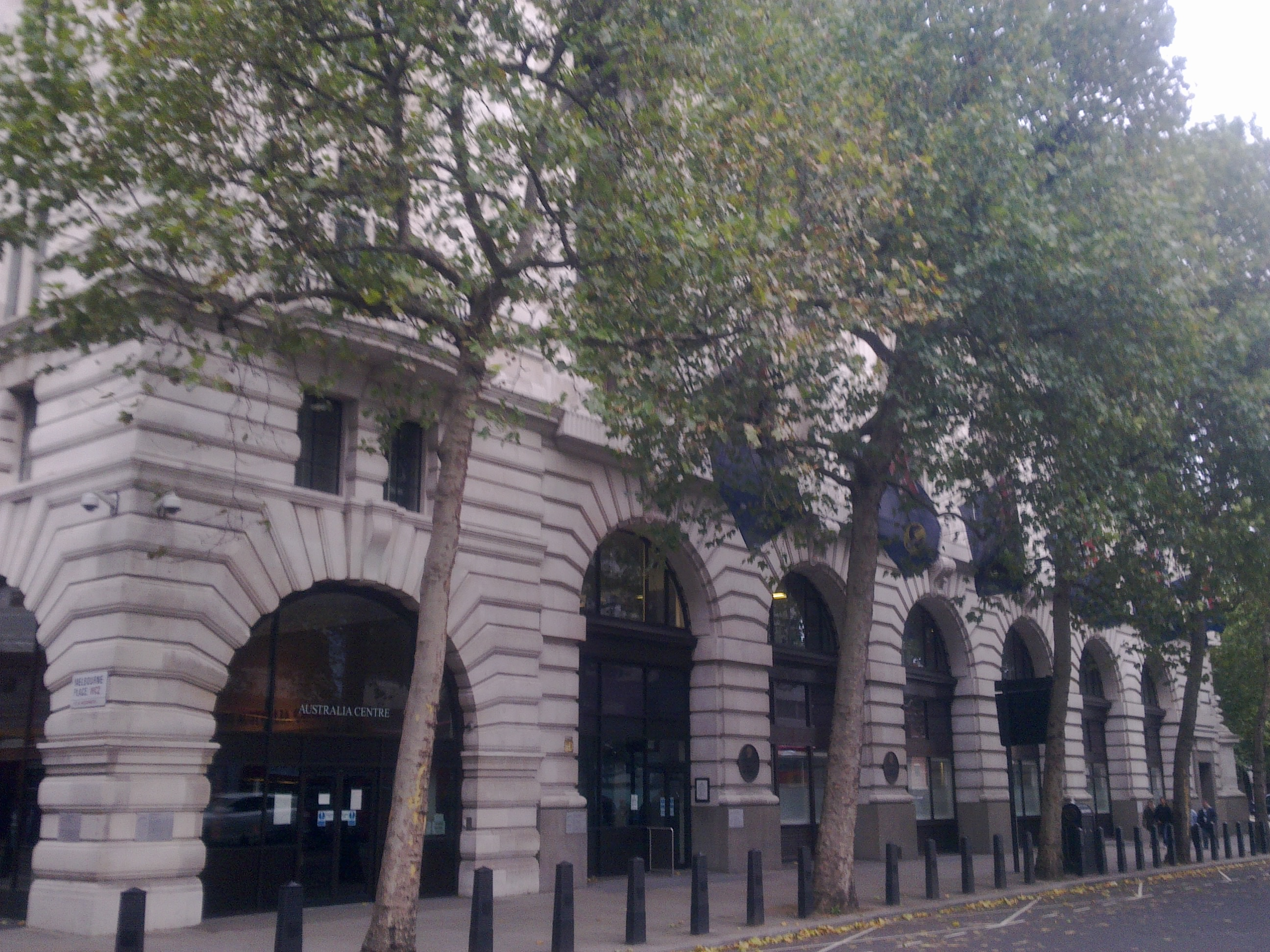
View from Strand

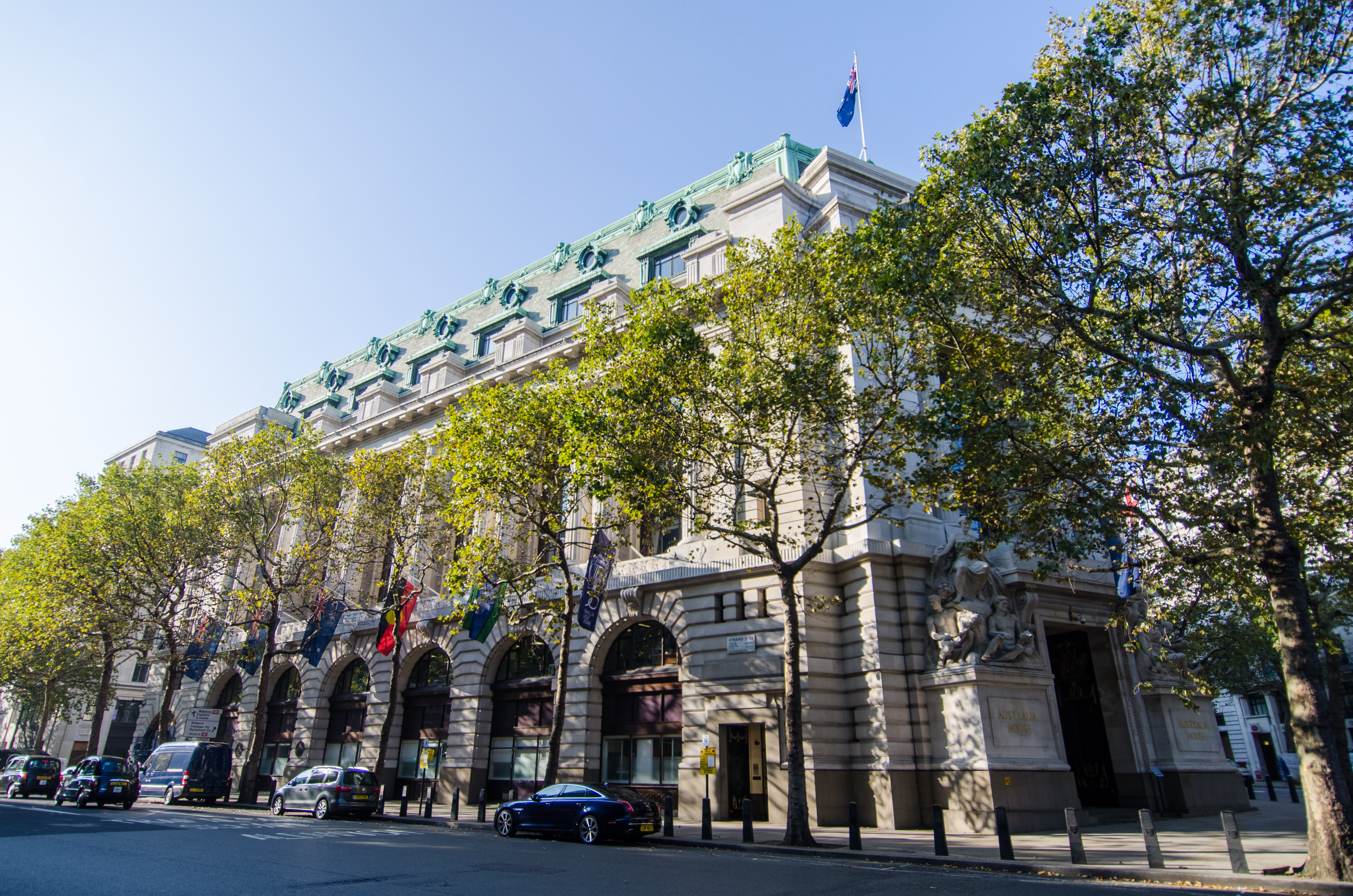
The High Commission

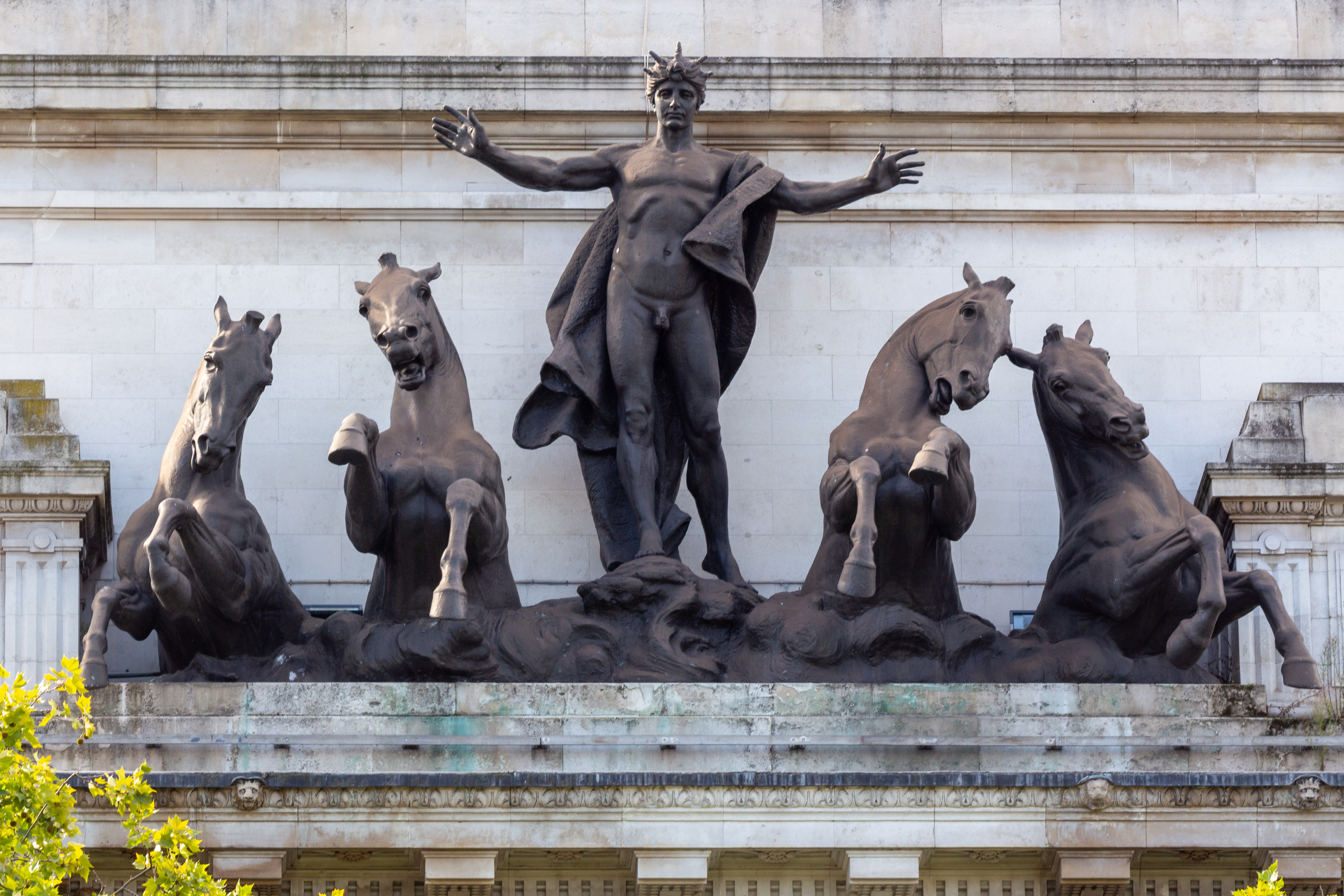
Phoebus Driving the Horses of the Sun by Bertram Mackennal

== See also ==
- Australia–United Kingdom relations
- List of high commissioners of Australia to the United Kingdom
- British High Commission, Canberra
- High Commissioners of the United Kingdom to Australia
- List of diplomatic missions in the United Kingdom
- List of diplomatic missions in London
- List of diplomatic missions of Australia
- Australian War Memorial, London
- Australia Gate
