= Thomas Brownrigg =

Captain Thomas Brownrigg CBE DSO
- Born: 8 July 1902
- Died: 9 October 1967 (aged 65); Finchampstead
- Occupations: Royal Navy officer; public administrator; television executive
- Employer: Associated-Rediffusion
- Title: Captain, RN
- Spouse: Joyce Chiesman (m. 1926–1967)
- Children: 2

Captain Thomas Marcus Brownrigg CBE DSO (8 July 1902 – 9 October 1967) was a British Royal Navy officer before and during World War II who later became the first General Manager of Bracknell New Town Development Corporation before becoming the first General Manager of Europe's first commercial television station, Associated-Rediffusion.

== Naval career ==
Brownrigg began his naval career as a midshipman in 1919. He progressed through the ranks, becoming a lieutenant in 1923 and a captain in 1942. He saw service on numerous ships, including pre-war stints on the flotilla leader HMS Montrose, the aircraft carrier HMS Furious, and the light cruiser HMS Cairo.

=== World War II ===
During the Second World War, Brownrigg served on the battleship HMS Warspite as Navigating Officer before taking a staff position under Admiral Sir Andrew Cunningham in the planning department of the Naval Expeditionary Force, preparing for D-Day.

He then became commanding officer of HMS Scylla for D-Day itself, whilst also serving as Flag Captain for the Eastern Task Force during the landings. He finished the war in command of the Royal Navy Air Station at Rattray (HMS Merganser).

=== Post-war ===
After the war, Brownrigg served briefly on HMS Theseus before taking a series of land-based naval positions. He served as Director of Plans for the Admiralty, Chief of Staff to the Commander-in-Chief for the Mediterranean and finally, in 1952, being briefly Naval Aide de Camp to the Queen.

Nevertheless, he had made enemies within the Admiralty due to his idiosyncratic nature and failed to progress beyond the rank of captain. He was placed on the retired list in July 1952.

== Bracknell New Town ==
Following his retirement from the navy, Brownrigg became General Manager of the Bracknell New Town Development Corporation. With his experience in planning for Operation Overlord, he was considered the ideal choice for implementing the development of a New Town as envisaged by Patrick Abercrombie and Lord Reith in their eponymous reports.

== Associated-Rediffusion ==
The experience of managing Bracknell was put to use in Brownrigg's next post, the one where he would, his war service notwithstanding, gain the most fame. The Television Act 1954 had created the framework for commercial broadcasting in the United Kingdom. British Electric Traction's Broadcast Relay Services subsidiary and Associated Newspapers formed a joint company, Associated-Rediffusion (A-R), to bid for a commercial television contract.

Because of the extensive planning and construction involved, they approached Brownrigg to become their General Manager. He accepted and put his imprint across the entire structure and output of the company.

Contemporaries reported that he commanded A-R as though it were a battleship. His "Official Office Memoranda", giving instructions and setting rules for everything down to the frequency of filing and the decoration on the walls, became a legend throughout ITV. Under his leadership, the company went from having one employee (himself) to becoming Europe's first and largest commercial television broadcaster in under a year. In that time, he supervised the conversion of the former headquarters of the Air Ministry, Adastral House, into Television House, A-R studios and administration headquarters, which also served as the headquarters for ITN, the TV Times and, at first, Associated TeleVision, A-R's main rival. At the same time, he was also actively involved in defining the station's identity, formulating the programme plans, creating an advertising market for television, chairing ITN and negotiating industrial relations with the film and broadcasting unions.

Many stories are told by old ITV hands about Brownrigg's idiosyncrasies, especially his dominant - or domineering - manner, his name-dropping, his willingness to generalise outrageously on any subject and his requirement for very junior staff to salute him and his fellow directors. However, personal friends also point out that he had a great sense of humour and an ability to laugh at himself - many of the anecdotes about him may therefore have derived from him in the first place.

=== Retirement ===
Brownrigg's A-R pitched itself as a formal, rigid broadcaster. In order to avoid comparison between A-R and the American networks, Brownrigg ensured that A-R was more "British" and "Empire" in its attitudes and identity than even the BBC. This had the desired effect, removing the accusation the commercial television would be "vulgar" or too light.

However, by the 1960s, increased competition and a change in spending-power demographics was evident in the United Kingdom. With the planned launch of BBC-2, aimed at the young and the upper middle-class, the new pirate offshore radio stations and a rejuvenated Radio Luxembourg, the senior management of the company felt that the future lay in younger viewers. To counter the competition, they decided to relaunch the station as Rediffusion, London and introduce new programming aimed at younger people and a new identity designed to be less "stuffy" and more able to compete with BBC-2.

In this new environment there was no place for Brownrigg and he retired to Finchampstead in Berkshire at the end of 1963, although he took on a directorship of the TV Times.

One of his last acts before his death was to condemn the Independent Television Authority for forcing Rediffusion into (minority) partnership with ABC Weekend TV to create the new Thames Television. His letter to The Times doesn't mention Rediffusion, London once - he stuck to calling the company he created "Associated-Rediffusion" until the end. He did not live to see the birth of Thames Television.

== Family ==
Thomas Brownrigg was the son of Colonel H J W Brownrigg and Evelyn (née Huleatt). He married Joyce Chiesman in 1926 and they had a son and a daughter.
