= LSE Clement House =

Coordinates: 51.513338°N 0.114990°W

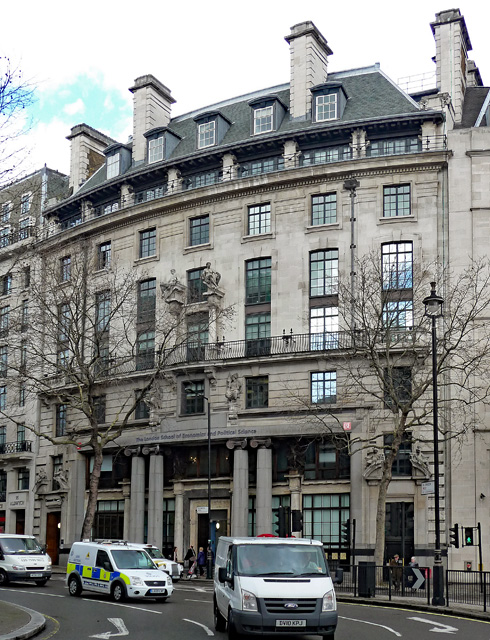
99 Aldwych or Clement House

Clement House is a building on the eastern edge of Aldwych, London. Designed by Scottish architect John James Burnet, the building was constructed in 1909–1910 as the London headquarters of the General Accident, Fire & Life Assurance Company. It was purchased by the London School of Economics in 1993 and subsequently converted into a teaching building.

== See also ==
- 32 Lincoln's Inn Fields
- Aldwych House
