= Northern Hotel (Scotland) =

Category A listed hotel in Aberdeen, Scotland

Coordinates: 57.1623°N 2.1164°W

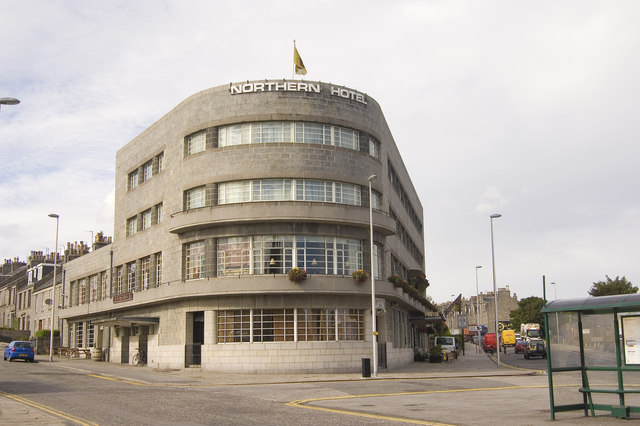
Exterior of the hotel

The Northern Hotel is a hotel in Aberdeen, Scotland.

Construction began in 1938 after the original hotel on the site (c. 1898) burned down, and it was completed by 1942. Designed by AGR Mackenzie in the Art Deco style, the four-storey hotel is built from reinforced concrete and faced with squared granite. While its exterior remains largely unchanged, the interior has lost many of the original features over the years. It was first listed in 1987 and was upgraded to Category A in 1990.

The hotel was listed for sale in 2017. In September 2022 the hotel was closed, however the public bar remained open. The owner blamed the closure on rising energy costs. In April 2024, a developer proposed the conversion of the hotel into 47 student flats.
