= Aldwych =

Area of London, England

Coordinates: 51.5132°N 0.1167°W

- Area
- Location within Greater London
- London borough: Westminster
- Ceremonial county: Greater London
- Region: London
- Country: England
- Sovereign state: United Kingdom
- Post town: LONDON
- Postcode district: WC2B
- Dialling code: 020
- Police: Metropolitan
- Fire: London
- Ambulance: London
- London Assembly: West Central

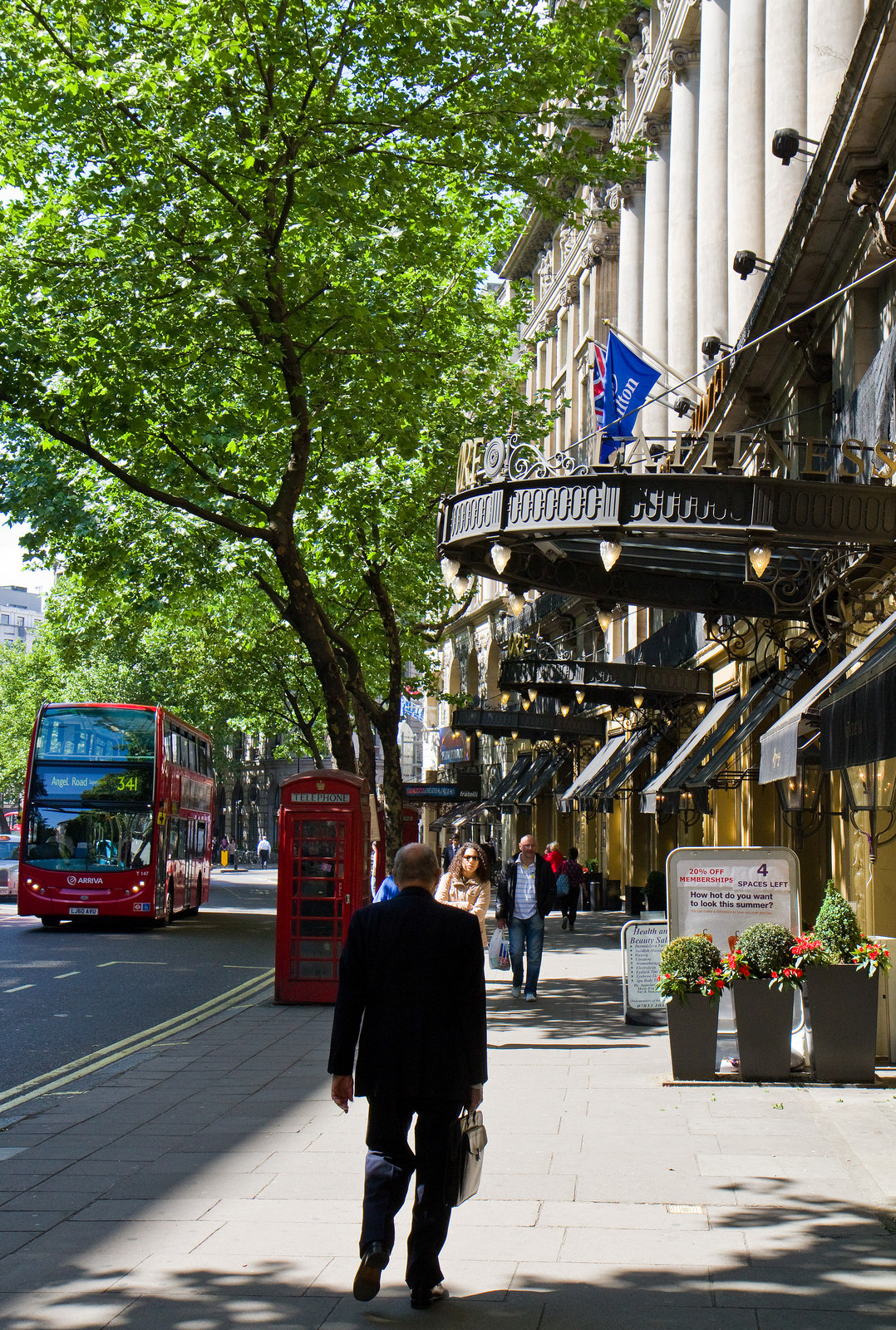
Part of Aldwych pictured in 2011

Aldwych (pronounced /ˈɔːldwɪtʃ/ AWLD-witch) is a street and the name of the area immediately surrounding it, in the City of Westminster, part of Greater London, and is part of the West End Theatreland. The 450 metres (1,480 ft) street starts 600 metres (2,000 ft) east-northeast of Charing Cross, the conventional map centre-point of the capital city.

In the 7th century, the area was an Anglo-Saxon settlement. The name means "old port", and was the port of the City of London.

== Current use ==
The semi-circular design of the street of Aldwych arises from its function, making navigable the gradient of the fall in levels between the roads connected by the street: the south end of Kingsway, and the Strand. It forms part of the A4 road from London to Avonmouth, Bristol.

The Aldwych area forms part of the Northbank business improvement district. It is known for hotels, restaurants, two theatres, and the High Commissions of India and Australia. It gives its name to the now-closed Underground station on the related section of the Strand (the return of the crescent), which poses as an active tube station in films and television shows. Marking the east end of the street and in the middle of the crescent return are Grade I heritage listed churches designed by Wren and Gibbs. Immediately north-east of St Clement Danes (St Clements), on the Strand, is the Royal Courts of Justice, a complex of courtrooms used by the senior courts of England and Wales, including the High Court and the Court of Appeal of England and Wales.

== Landmarks ==
Aldwych, the street, is a crescent, connected to the Strand at both ends, and forms part of the A4 route. Streets adjoining are Drury Lane, Kingsway, India Place and Melbourne Place. Notable buildings along its length include:

Theatres:

- Aldwych Theatre, opened in 1905
- Novello Theatre, opened in 1905

High Commissions:

- India House, the High Commission of India in London
- Australia House, the High Commission of Australia in London

Hotels and Restaurants:

- The Waldorf Hilton, London, a hotel opened in 1908
- The ME Hotel, designed by Richard Rogers
- One Aldwych

Universities:

- Bush House, King House, Melbourne House and Strand House – making up the Aldwych Quarter – formerly the office headquarters of the BBC World Service from 1941 to 2012 and now part of the Strand Campus of King's College London
- Connaught House, Columbia House, Aldwych House, and Clement House, buildings of the London School of Economics

Former buildings include:

- Gaiety Theatre, opened in 1864 and closed in 1939
- Television House (now known as 61 Aldwych), former headquarters of several defunct ITV franchise contractors and ITN

Facing one end of the street on the Strand is closed-in-1994 Aldwych station, originally named Strand station. It has been used when closed for scenes of films and television dramas.

== History ==
In the seventh century, the area was an Anglo-Saxon major settlement Lundenwic (the last syllable pronounced as today) ('London port') centred one mile to the west of Londinium (known to the Saxons as Lundenburh 'London fort'). "Lundenwic" later became the old wich (old port, that is Aldwych). It is not known if it had a church, and the town either took advantage of the scouring action of the Fleet or used the mouth itself as a harbour for trading ships and fishing boats. After Alfred the Great re-built the London fortifications in the late 9th century, Londinium became known as Lundenburh or simply Lunden, and Lundenwic so became ealdwic or aldwich. (The word "old" evolved from ald, the Old English being eald and the German cognate being alt.) The name was recorded as Aldewich in 1211.

St Clement Danes is one of the four ancient Westminster parishes and was first recorded in the 1190s; it once covered the whole of Aldwych and all adjoining areas. Its church, which features in the first line of the nursery rhyme Oranges and Lemons, was rebuilt by Wren. The civil parish was abolished in 1922. It is open to – and it is known by residents and businesses to – use the term St Clement Danes interchangeably with Aldwych, which also covered in its final, smallest form the Adelphi and much of the Strand.

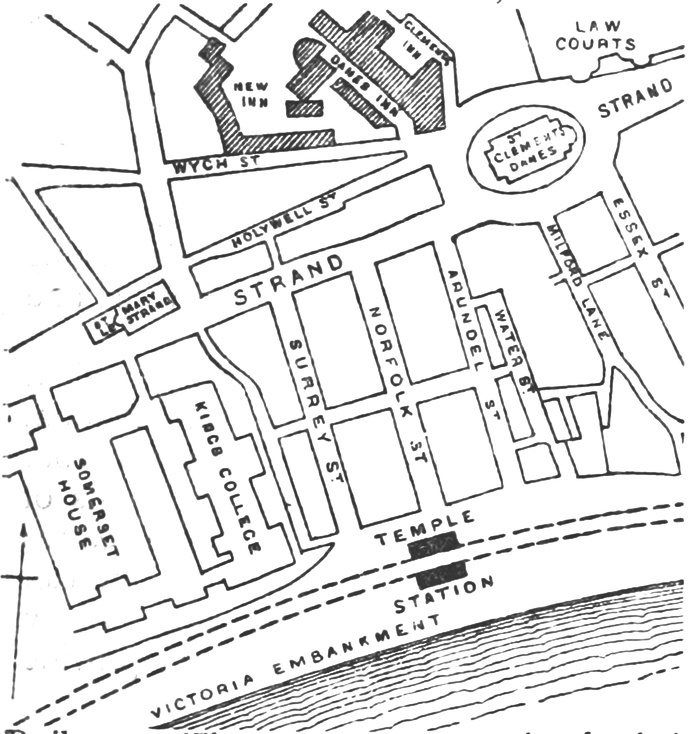
1888 plan showing Aldwych before the construction of the modern street. The eastern part of the new street cut a swathe through just to the north of Wych Street.

The urban centre of Lundenwic was unearthed in the 1980s after extensive excavations, and were reinterpreted as being urban in character. These conclusions were reached independently by two archaeologists (Vince and Biddle). Recent excavations in Covent Garden adjoining have uncovered an extensive Anglo-Saxon settlement, covering about 150 acres (0.61 km^{2}), stretching from the present-day National Gallery site in the west, to Aldwych in the east. As the presumed locus of the city, Lundenburh, was moved back within the old Roman walls, the older settlement of Lundenwic gained the name of ealdwic, 'old port', "eald" and the softer form of "wic" transposed to "ald" and "wich" in Middle English orthography.

The street was created in the early 20th century in a project that saw a new street layout destroying Wych Street which was full of overhangs and projections, and the construction of Australia House (built 1913–18) and Bush House (completed 1925). A statue of the 19th-century prime minister William Ewart Gladstone was installed in 1905 near St Clement Danes church, at the eastern end of Aldwych.

In 1906, Aldwych tramway station was opened underneath Kingsway; it closed in 1952. In 1907, Aldwych station was opened on the Strand opposite Aldwych; it closed in 1994.

On 12 October 1925, Aldwych and the section of Strand to its south became the first "roundabout system" in London, i.e. a set of roads with one-way traffic clockwise.

On 18 February 1996, a bomb was detonated prematurely on a number 171 bus travelling along Aldwych, killing its carrier, Provisional Irish Republican Army member Edward O'Brien and injuring several passengers.

In 2021, the Strand was pedestrianised between Melbourne Place and Lancaster Place, and Aldwych reverted to being a two-way street.
