= Elisabeth Bowers =

Canadian writer

Elisabeth Bowers (born October 10, 1949) is a Canadian writer of mystery fiction.

A native of Vancouver, British Columbia, Bowers later moved to the Gulf Islands. She is an alumna of the University of British Columbia, and during her career has held a variety of jobs. She wrote two detective novels, set in Vancouver, featuring Meg Lacey, a full-time detective and divorced mother. The first, Ladies' Night, was a finalist for the Arthur Ellis Award for Best First Novel. Her work has been described as "some of the very best in Canadian crime writing".

== Works ==
- Ladies Night (1988)
- No Forwarding Address (1991)
