= Elisabeth Bowes =

Australian diplomat

Elisabeth Bowes PSM
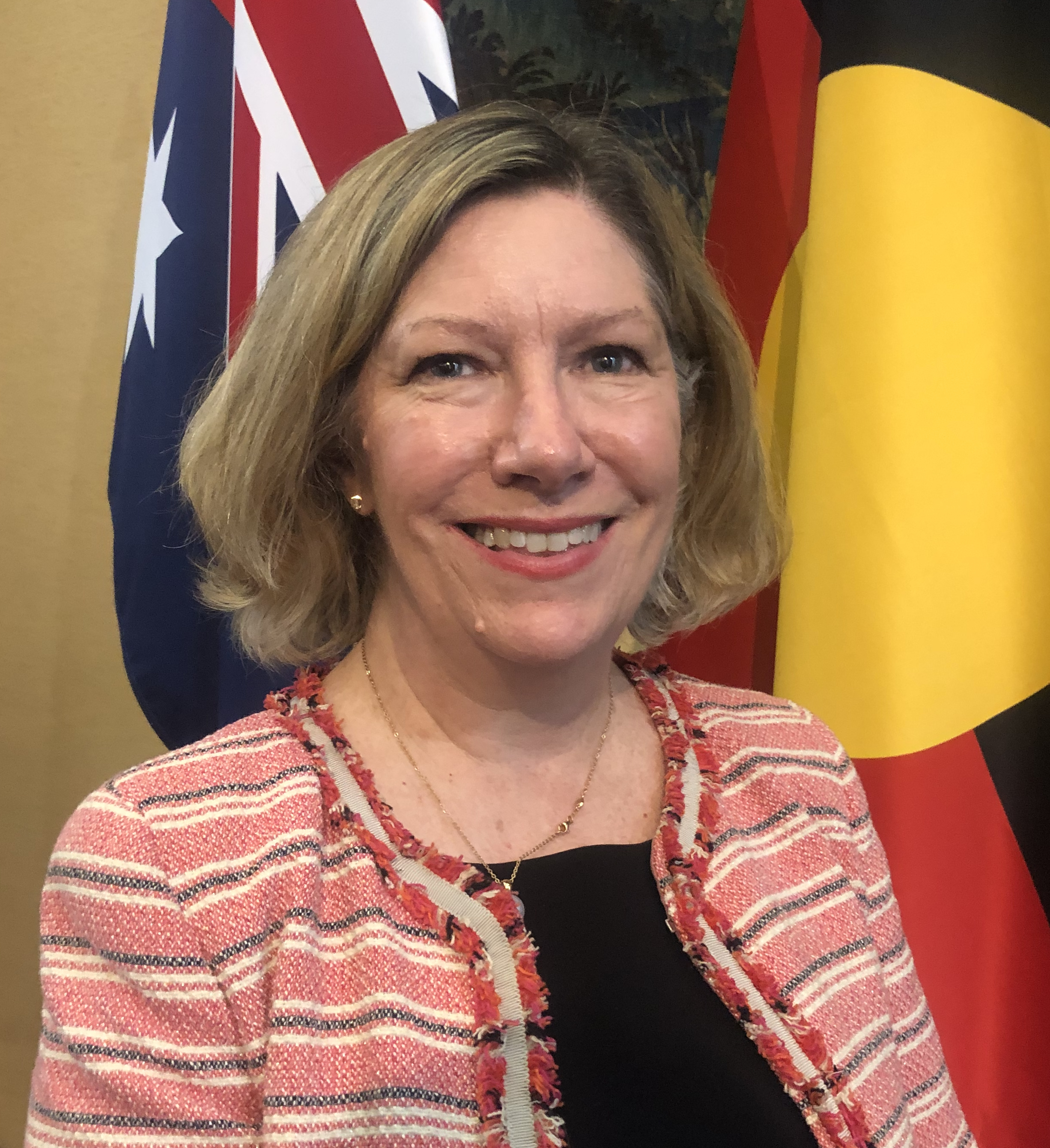

Deputy Head of Mission to the United Kingdom
- Incumbent
- Assumed office January 2023

Personal details
- Occupation: Diplomat

Elisabeth Mae Bowes is an Australian diplomat currently serving as the Deputy High Commissioner to the United Kingdom.

From 2009 to 2012, Bowes was Counsellor to Australia’s Permanent Mission to the World Trade Organization in Geneva. Then, from 2012 to 2016, she was head of the Australian "Tobacco Plain Packaging Taskforce", during which she led Australia’s defence at the World Trade Organization in dispute settlement proceedings regarding Australia's world first tobacco plain packaging legislation.

From 2016 to 2019 she "oversaw bilateral trade relations between the US and Australia" while posted to the Australian Embassy in Washington DC, and from 2020 was the chief negotiator of the Australia–United Kingdom Free Trade Agreement. This was the UK's first trade agreement "negotiated from scratch" post-Brexit, and came into force in 2023.

Bowes received Bachelor of Arts (honours) and Bachelor of Laws (honours) degrees from the University of Queensland in 1993, and a Master of Philosophy in International Relations from the University of Oxford in 1997 with a theses entitled "Art of the state: plunder and restitution of cultural property". Prior to joining the Department of Foreign Affairs and Trade she had served at the United Nations Compensation Commission in Geneva and a legal officer at the International Tribunal for the Law of the Sea in Hamburg.

Bowes was awarded the Public Service Medal in 2021 for her work in international trade policy, with particular with reference to taskforce:

...Australia's ground breaking legislation was challenged by several countries and her persistence was admirable as the Taskforce came under sustained and protracted pressure from a well-funded and influential tobacco industry. She personally argued Australia's case and successfully defended Australia's position during panel hearings at the WTO. The outcome achieved ensured Australia could continue to pursue policies to reduce tobacco use, and improve health outcomes for the community, seeing a significant decline in the number of young smokers. Additionally, it encouraged many other countries to introduce similar measures, aimed at enhancing health outcomes for their own citizens..

— Public Service Medal award citation.

Diplomatic posts
Preceded by Julie Heckscher	Deputy Head of Mission to the United Kingdom; 2023–	Incumbent
