= 61 Aldwych =

Coordinates: 51°30′49″N 0°07′02″W

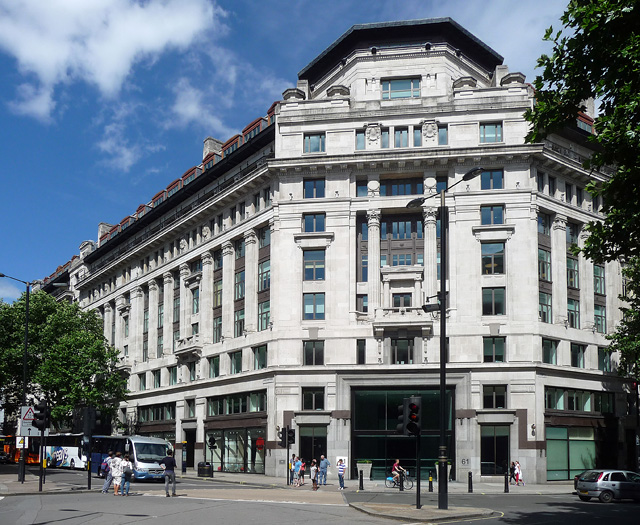

General information
- Location: 61 Aldwych, London, England
- Year built: 1914

Design and construction
- Architecture firm: Trehearne & Norman
- Main contractor: William Taylor & Co.

61 Aldwych is a building on Kingsway in London. The building was constructed in 1914 as three conjoined blocks called India House, Empire House, and Connaught House. In 1915 a fourth block, Canada House, was added at 14 Kingsway.

In 1919, the Air Ministry took up quarters at 61 Aldwych, at which time the building became known as Adastral House. From 1955, the building was the headquarters of Associated-Rediffusion/Rediffusion London, Independent Television News (ITN), TV Times magazine, the Independent Television Companies Association and, at first, Associated Television. Later, it was the initial base for Rediffusion's successor, Thames Television. After Thames moved out, it was the headquarters of the General Register Office for England and Wales and subsequently of ExxonMobil. In 2025, the building was acquired by the London School of Economics and Political Science (LSE). It is now known as 61 Aldwych.

== History ==
=== Adastral House ===
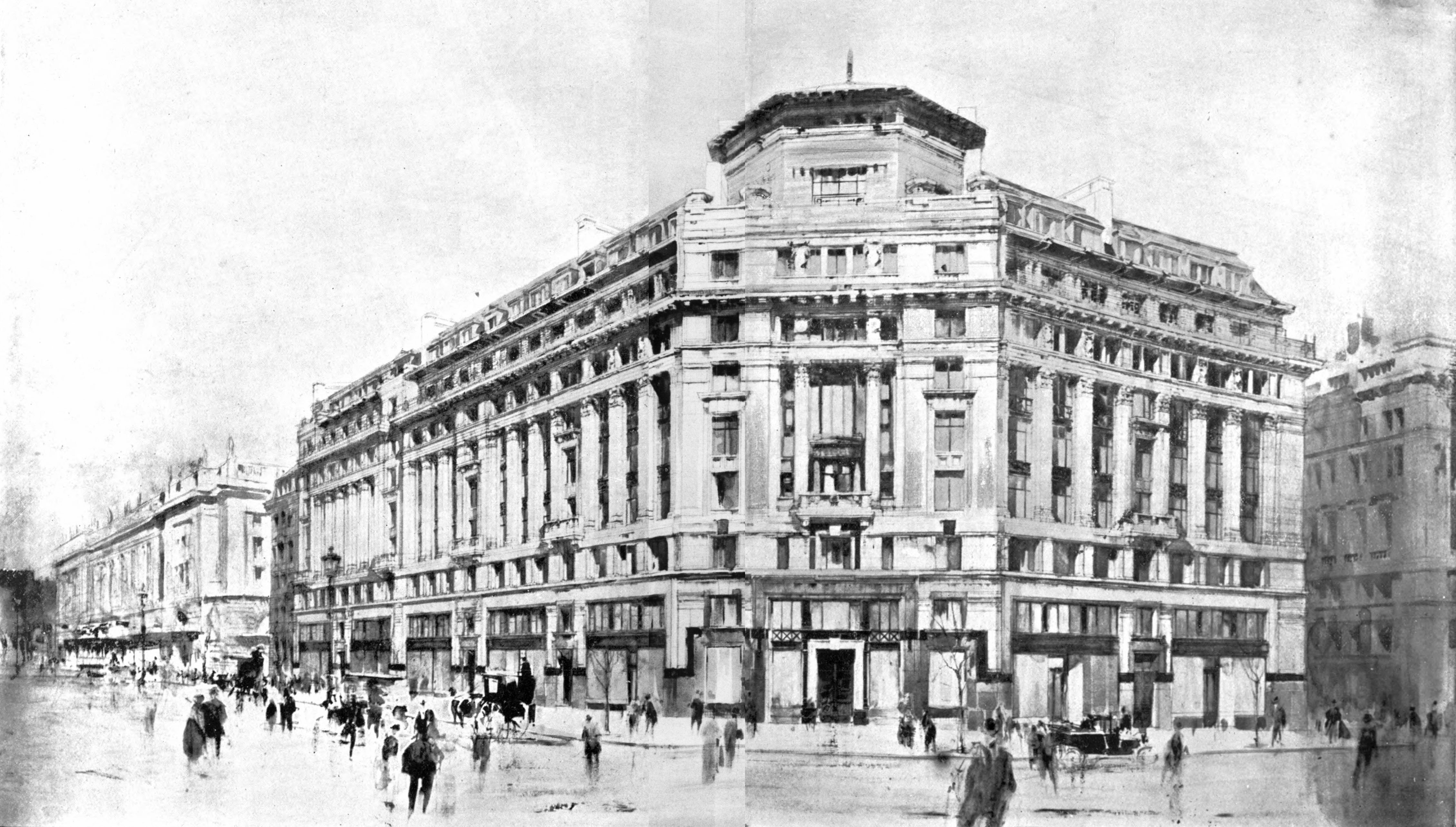
Watercolour rendering of Canada, India, Empire, and Connaught Houses

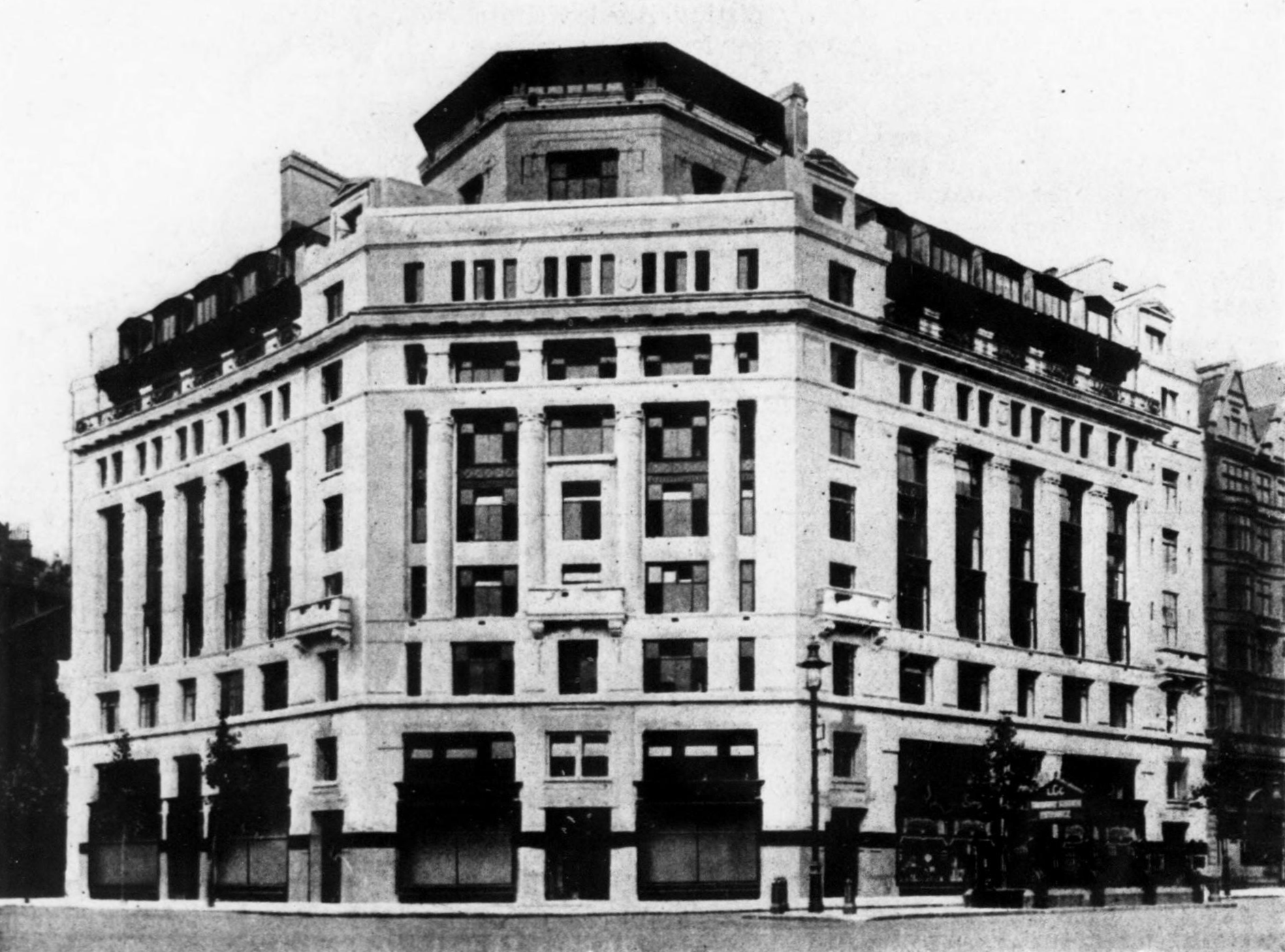
The near-twin of 61 Aldwych at 1 Kingsway, known originally as Shell Corner, was built after World War I. Together, the two buildings formed the gateway to Kingsway.

The Kingsway area had been redeveloped at the start of the 20th century from slums and tenement housing into a broad avenue with grand office buildings and expensive townhouses.

After the formation of the Air Ministry in 1918, its headquarters was on Kingsway; one of two identical buildings opposite Bush House became Adastral House, the name being derived from the RAF motto. This remained the home of the Air Ministry through World War II, and the roof of the building in 1940 during The Blitz is where, while fire-watching, Arthur Harris, made the remark about the bombing to a companion, "Well, they are sowing the wind...". The building became known to the public after the war as it was announced during BBC weather forecasts that the Met Office had measured the temperatures and wind speeds in central London from its roof.

During WWII, a Jamaican teenager called Billy Strachan sold all of his possessions and travelled all the way from the Caribbean to Adastral House, incorrectly believing that this was where he should go to join the Royal Air Force (RAF). When he arrived he was racially abused by the guards, before being rescued by sergeant who gave Strachan correct instructions on how to join the RAF. Strachan then went onto become an accomplished bomber pilot and a pioneer of black civil rights in Britain.

=== Television House ===
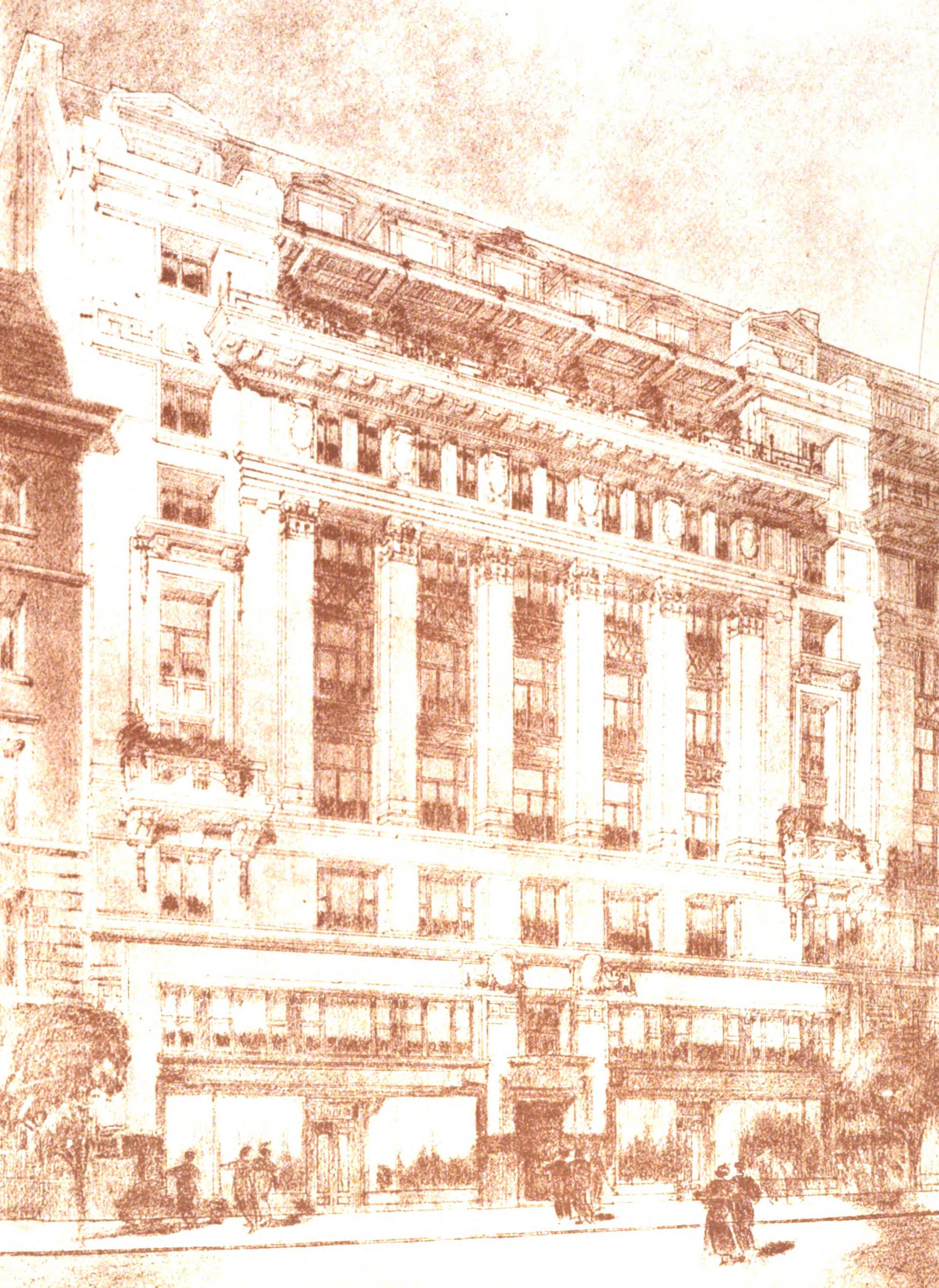
Canada House at 14 Kingsway, which continues the façade northwards along the street

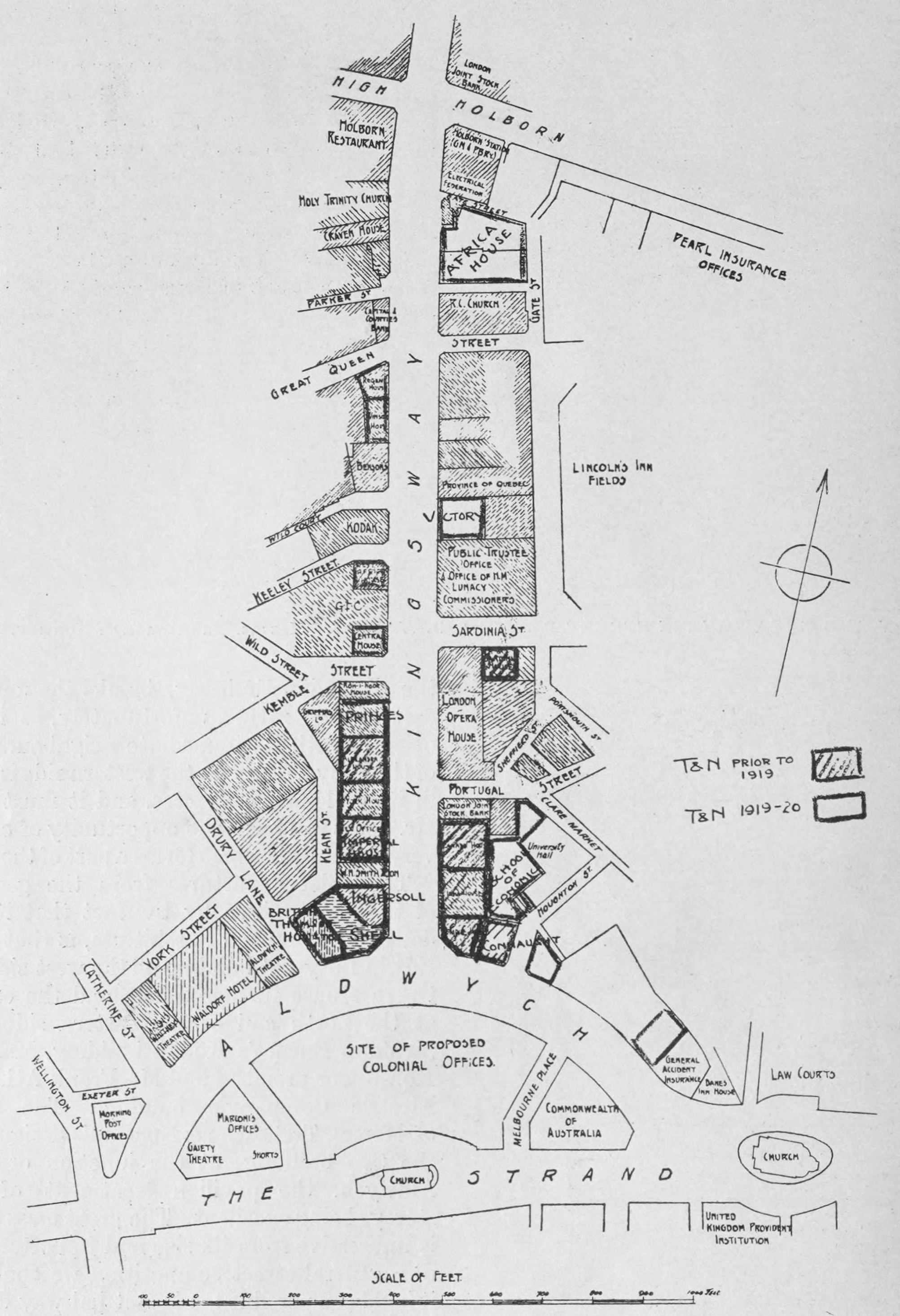
Map of Kingsway, showing buildings by Trehearne & Norman

In 1954, the Independent Television Authority (ITA) awarded the first two contracts for the imminent ITV commercial television network. Because the BBC had previously held a monopoly on broadcasting, there were no non-BBC television studio facilities in the UK. Associated-Rediffusion, as one of the two contractors, needed to build from scratch a whole new facility. The company had hired Thomas Brownrigg as General Manager, partially due to his extensive knowledge of planning and project management, which would be needed in simultaneously building a new company and its studios and headquarters.

British Electric Traction, the majority owner of Associated-Rediffusion, bought the freehold on Adastral House from the government. Brownrigg engaged Bovis Limited (later Bovis Construction) to gut the building internally and build a new suite of offices, technical facilities, and studios to be called Television House. This was begun in early 1955 and, with a planned start date for ITV of 22 September 1955, was worked on at great speed, virtually 24 hours a day.

Four small studios (numbered 7, 8, 9, and 10) were built inside the building, mainly for current affairs and continuity use (the main large studios, later the Fountain Studios, were based at the former 20th Century Fox studios in Wembley in Middlesex). Additionally, office space and dining facilities for over 1,000 people were created. A suite of management offices, replete with an oak-paneled boardroom, was built.

The original headquarters and studio facilities of ITN were located on the seventh and eighth floors of the building.

TV Times, part-owned by Associated-Rediffusion, occupied offices in the building from 1957 until April 1958.

A computer room, housing an early mainframe computer that controlled advertising bookings, was added on the second floor in 1966.

Associated TeleVision (ATV) inhabited Television House for the first few years of broadcasting, mainly as office accommodation rather than studio facilities. For a period early in ITV's history, Associated-Rediffusion provided this space for free as part of the effort to keep ITV afloat during the financial crisis of 1955-1957.

=== St Catherine's House ===
In the 1967 ITV contract round, the ITA awarded the London weekday contract to a joint company formed from ABC Weekend TV and Rediffusion Television, Thames Television. This new company had a surplus number of studios in London. The Wembley studios were therefore sold to the then-new London Weekend Television. Thames, controlled by the former ABC, decided that a brand new studio complex, equipped from the start for colour broadcasting and located out of the center of London would be more appropriate.

Thames used Television House as its headquarters whilst the building of the new Thames Television House in Euston took place.

When Television House was vacated in 1970, the building was again occupied by the government, this time by the General Register Office for England and Wales (previously based in Somerset House). It was renamed St Catherine's House, and was used to house the birth, marriage and death certificates of the English and Welsh populations. In 1997, the building was vacated by the General Register Office (now the Office of Population Censuses and Surveys), which moved to Southport in Merseyside.

After extensive refurbishment, the building became the UK headquarters of ExxonMobil.

=== Centrium ===
After ExxonMobil left, the building was renamed "The Centrium" and housed several organisations, including Herman Miller, the Nursing and Midwifery Council, SVG Capital, Takeda Pharmaceuticals, Ashmore Group, Tishman Speyer and Interconnector UK

=== 61 Aldwych ===
The building was subsequently renamed "61 Aldwych" by manager Tishman Speyer. The building's management was later transferred to BH2 and Cushman & Wakefield.

== Production space ==
- Studio 7: 702 sq ft (65.2 m^{2}). 33 by 24 ft (10.1 by 7.3 m)
- Studio 8: 950 sq ft (88 m^{2}). 38' by 25' = 11.6 m x 7.6 m
- Studio 9: 2,416 sq ft (224.5 m^{2}). 64' by 40' = 19.5 m x 12.2 m
- Studio 10: 312 sq ft (29.0 m^{2}). 26 by 12 ft (7.9 by 3.7 m) = 8 m x 3.7 m
- Master Control: 900 sq ft (84 m^{2}).
- Maintenance Workshop: 1,150 sq ft (107 m^{2}).
- VTR (with 2 × Ampex video recorders): 320 sq ft (30 m^{2}).
- Telecine (with 2 × Cintel, 1 × RCA Vidicon and 2 × EMI Flying Spot telecine machines): 1,150 sq ft (107 m^{2}).
- Rehearsal rooms × 6: 7,500 sq ft (700 m^{2}).
- Projector theatres × 6
- Cutting rooms × 15
- Dubbing theatre

== Building plans ==
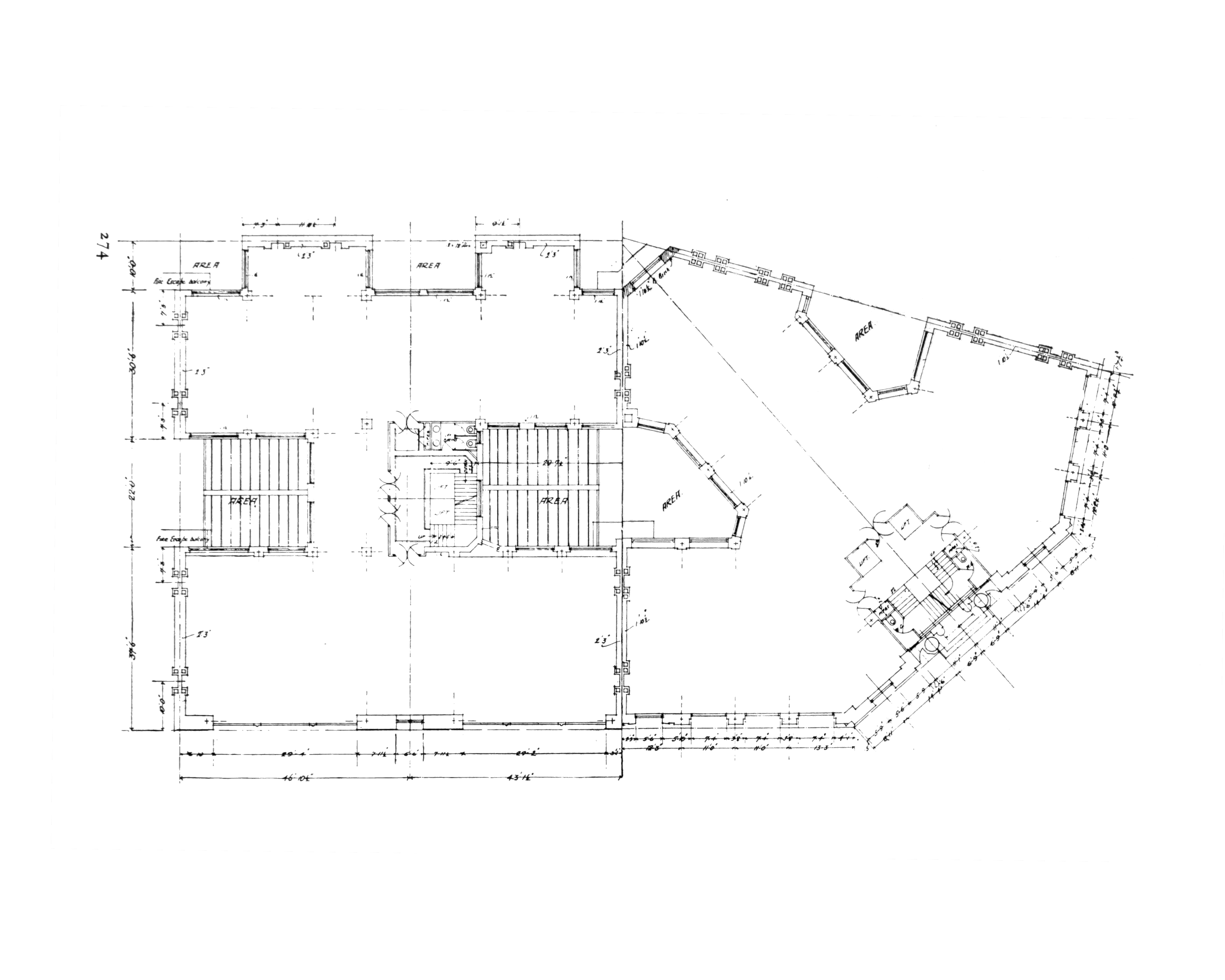
Ground floor

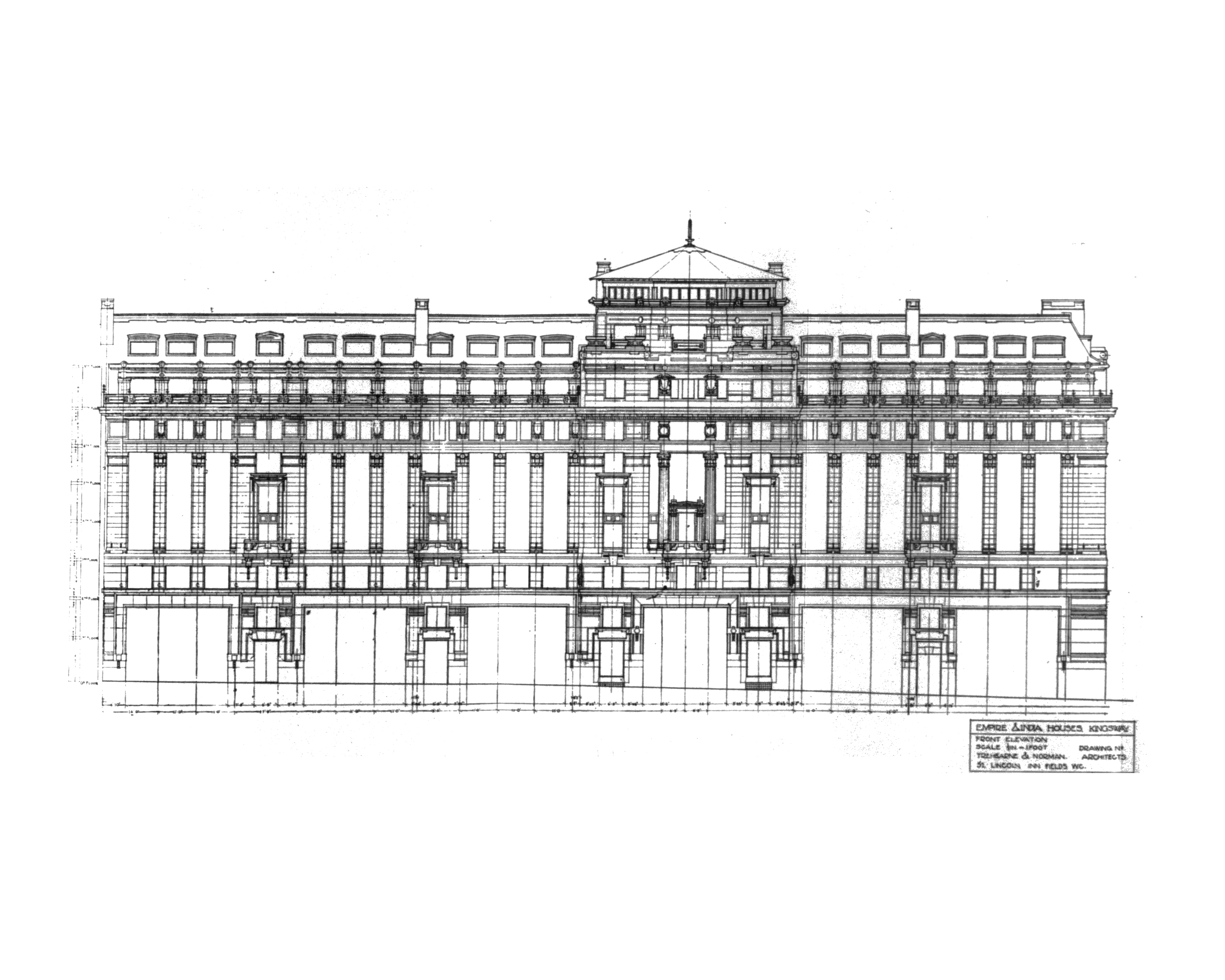
Elevation

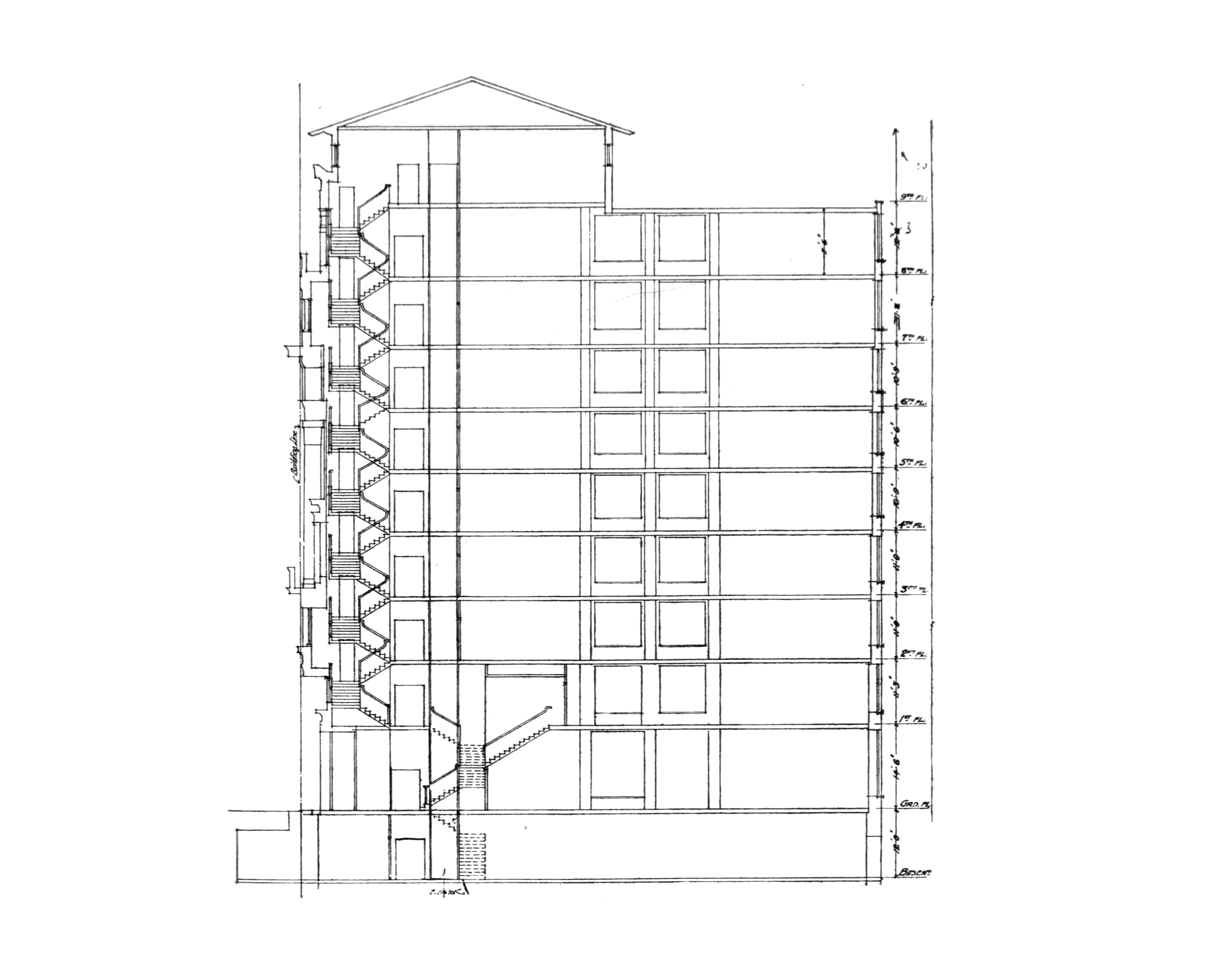
Cross-section

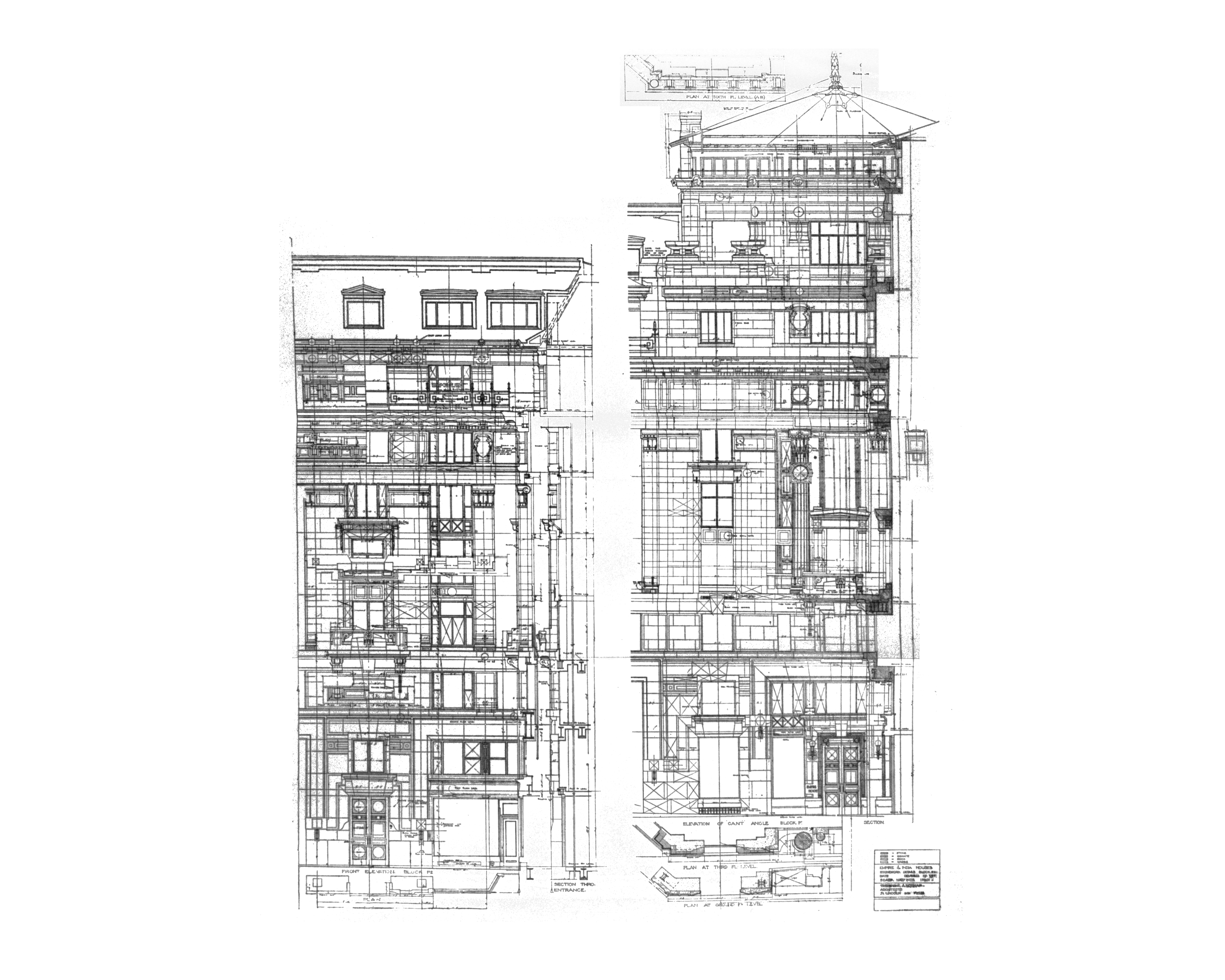
Stonework details

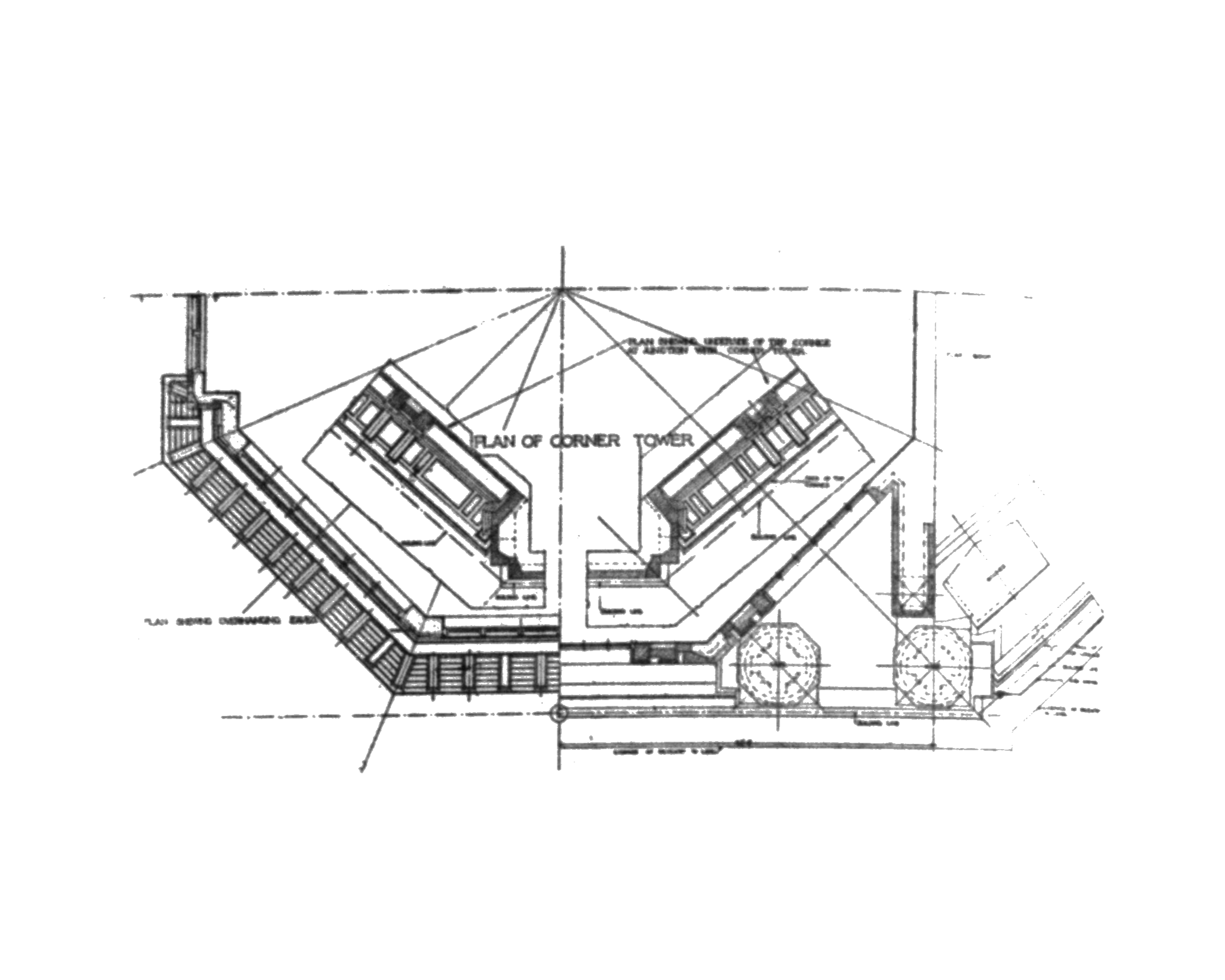
Corner tower floor plan

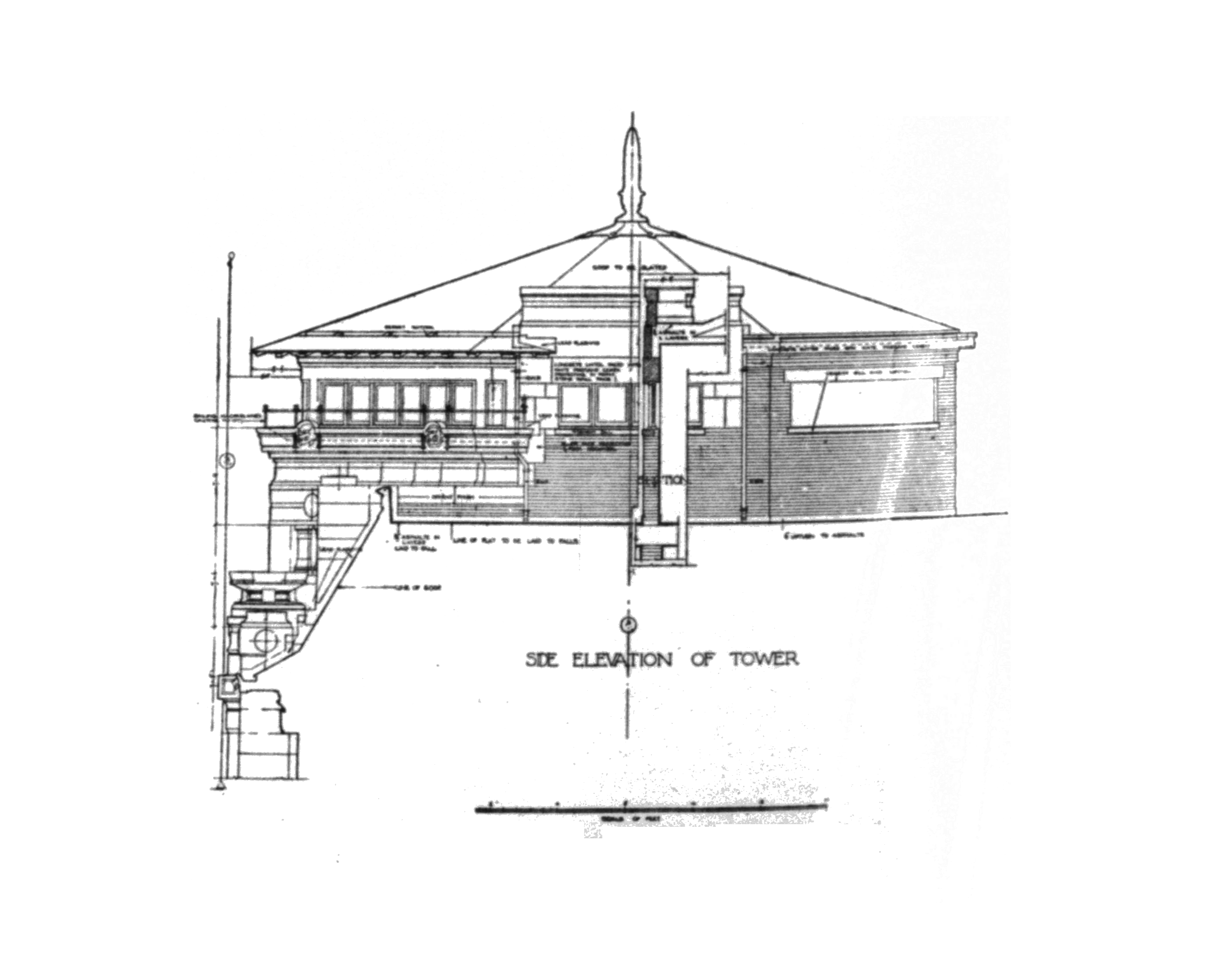
Corner tower elevation

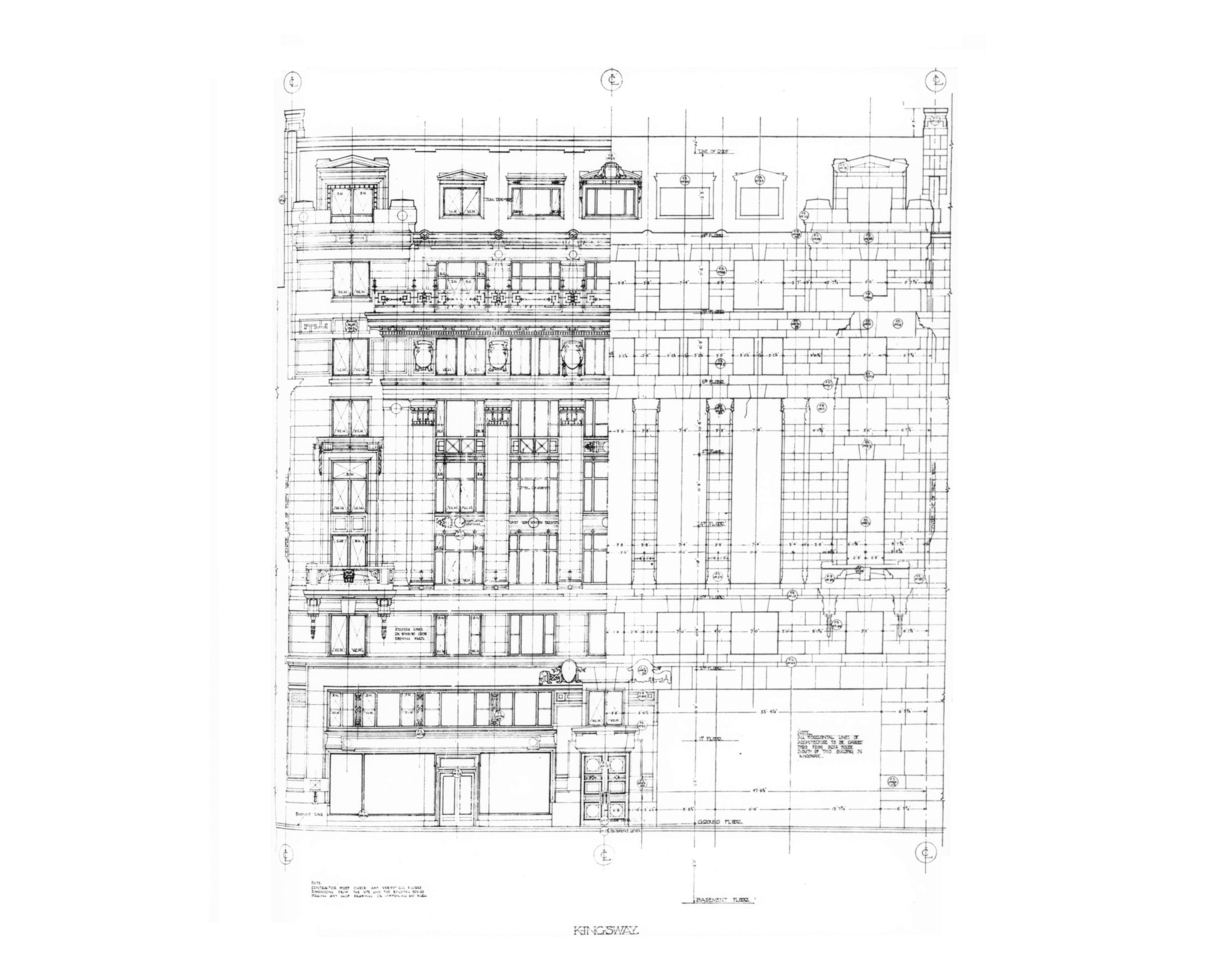
Elevation (Canada House)

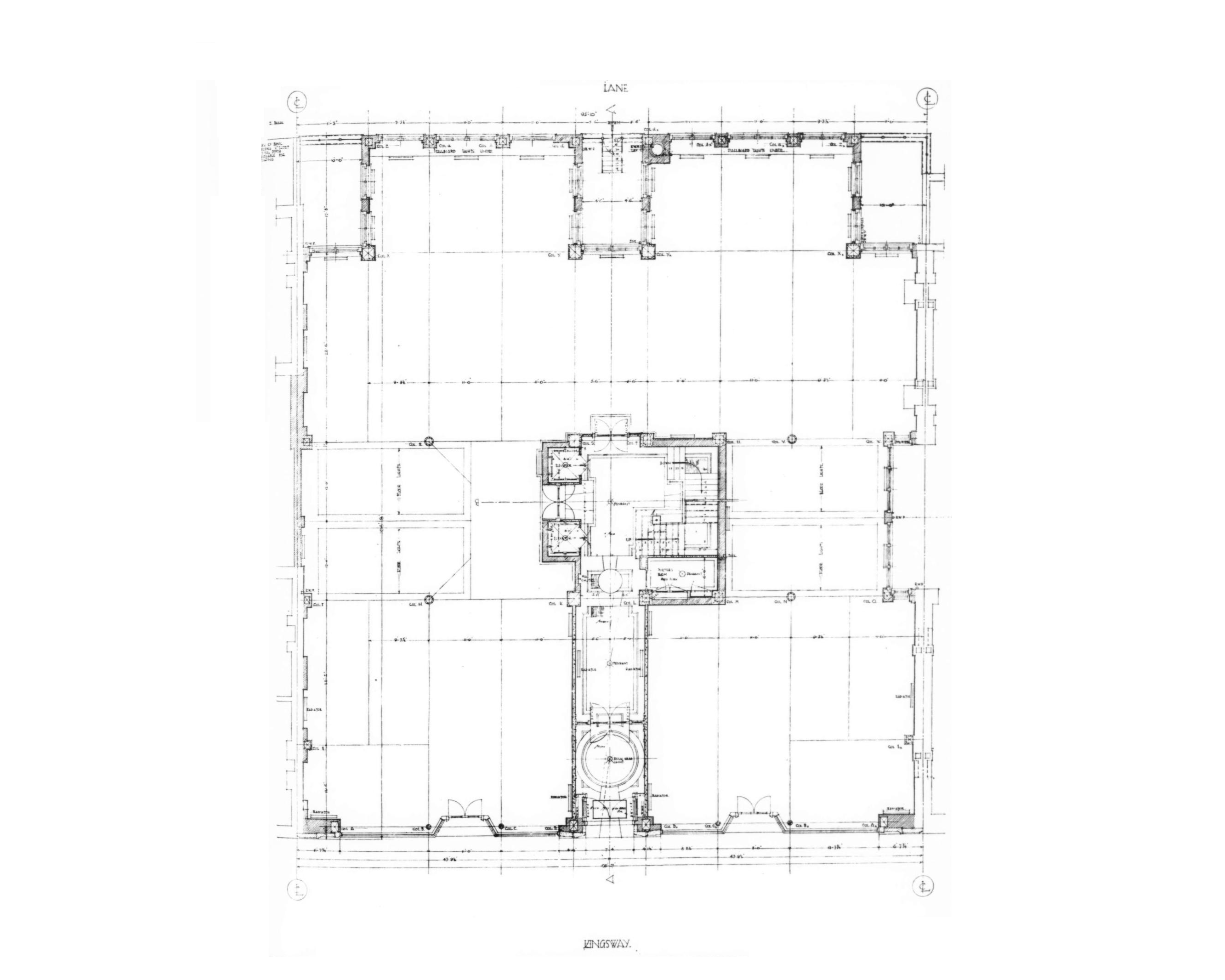
Ground floor (Canada House)

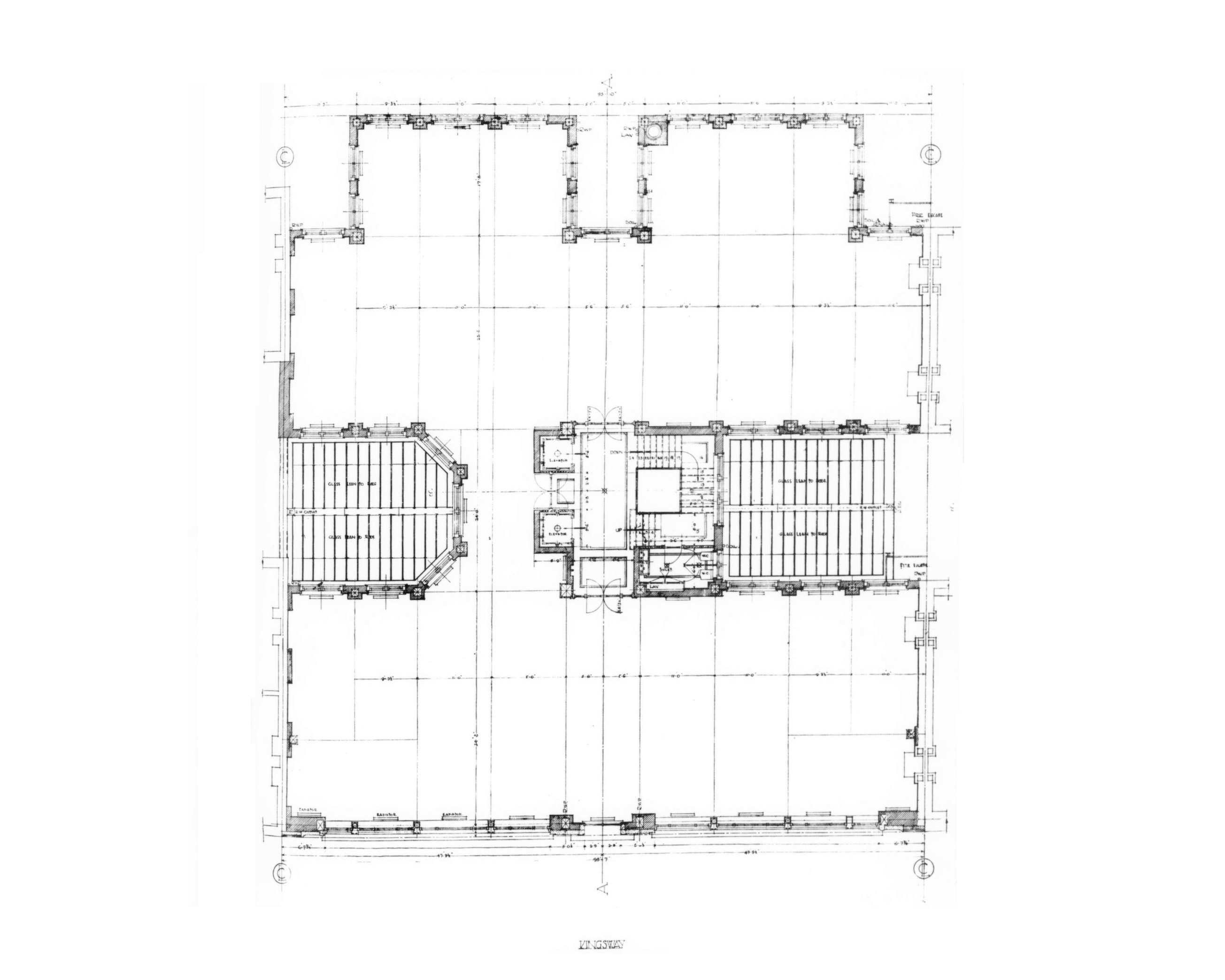
First floor (Canada House)
