= The Waldorf Hilton, London =

Luxury hotel in London

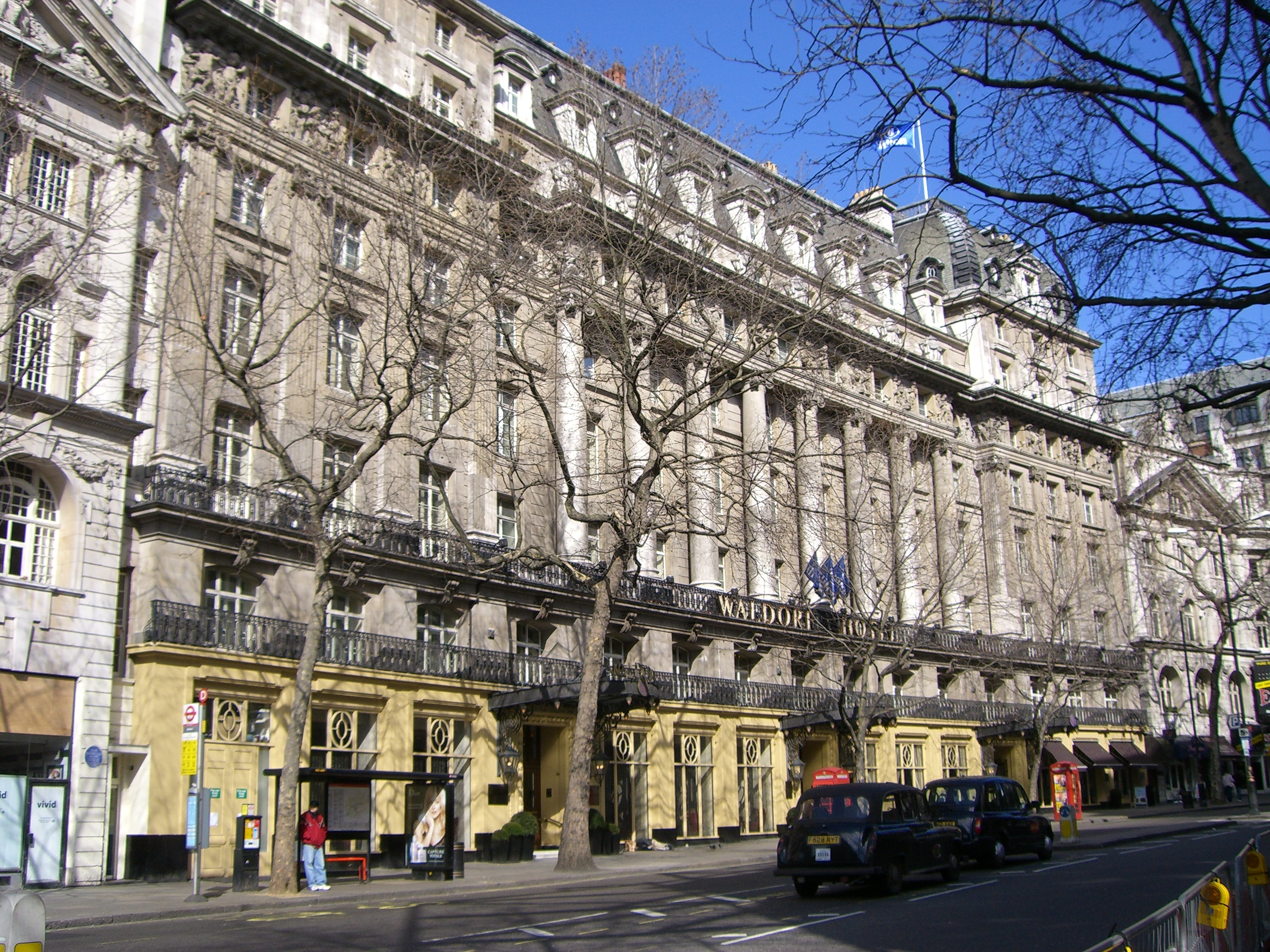

- Location within Central London

General information
- Location: Aldwych, London, WC2B 4DD, United Kingdom
- Coordinates: 51.5126°N 0.1189°W
- Opened: 1908
- Operator: Hilton Hotels & Resorts

Other information
- Number of rooms: 298

Website
- Official website

The Waldorf Hilton, London, formerly known as the Waldorf Hotel, is a historic hotel in Aldwych, London. It is part of the Hilton Hotels & Resorts chain and has a history dating back to 1908. The hotel was originally established by William Waldorf Astor, 1st Viscount Astor, a member of the prominent Astor family. The hotel features 298 guest rooms, including 19 suites.

== History ==
The Waldorf, London, opened in 1908 with a vision to follow the American tradition of offering not just rooms but a place for passers-by to stop for dinner, afternoon tea or a drink. It opened with 400 bedrooms, 176 bathrooms and a range of innovative features – a telephone and electric lights that could be switched off at the bedside in all rooms, three elevators and central heating.

=== Chronology ===
1889 – Theatrical impresario Edward Sanders decided to build a major West End hotel on the northern rim of Aldwych. Sanders partnered with accountant Thomas Wild to raise the sum of £700,000, with the assistance of William Waldorf Astor, whom the hotel was named after in gratitude.

1908 – Employing a steel girder structure, the hotel was erected in 18 months and opened on 28 January with a champagne reception.

1913 – The first of many tangos was performed in the Palm Court, scandalising Edwardian society.

1934 – The resident house band was led by Howard Godfrey and his Waldorfians. Godfrey recorded 15 "Live at the Waldorf" 78 rpm discs with singer Al Bowlly. Hits included "Love is the Sweetest Thing" and "Goodnight, Sweetheart".

1939 – During WWII the Waldorf placed adverts in the press reassuring visitors that its alloy structure made it safe. One stray bomb missed the hotel but shockwaves shattered the Palm Court roof and tango tea dances were suspended. The restaurant became a staff dormitory and the hotel's head waiter slept in a corner every night to keep an eye on it.

1964 – Egon Ronay launched his hotel guides at the Waldorf.

1969 – Melody Maker hosted its music awards ceremony at the Waldorf.

1979 – Scenes from the Titanic film SOS TITANIC were shot in the Palm Court.

1982 – The Waldorf held its first Tango Teas since 1939.

1995 – The Meridien hotel group took over from the Forte family and renamed the hotel Le Meridien Waldorf.

2004 – Hilton Hotels Corporation took over the hotel and renamed it The Waldorf Hilton.

2005 – The Waldorf was given a £30 million refurbishment.

2015 – The Waldorf Hilton received a further £13.5 million refurbishment.

== Architecture ==
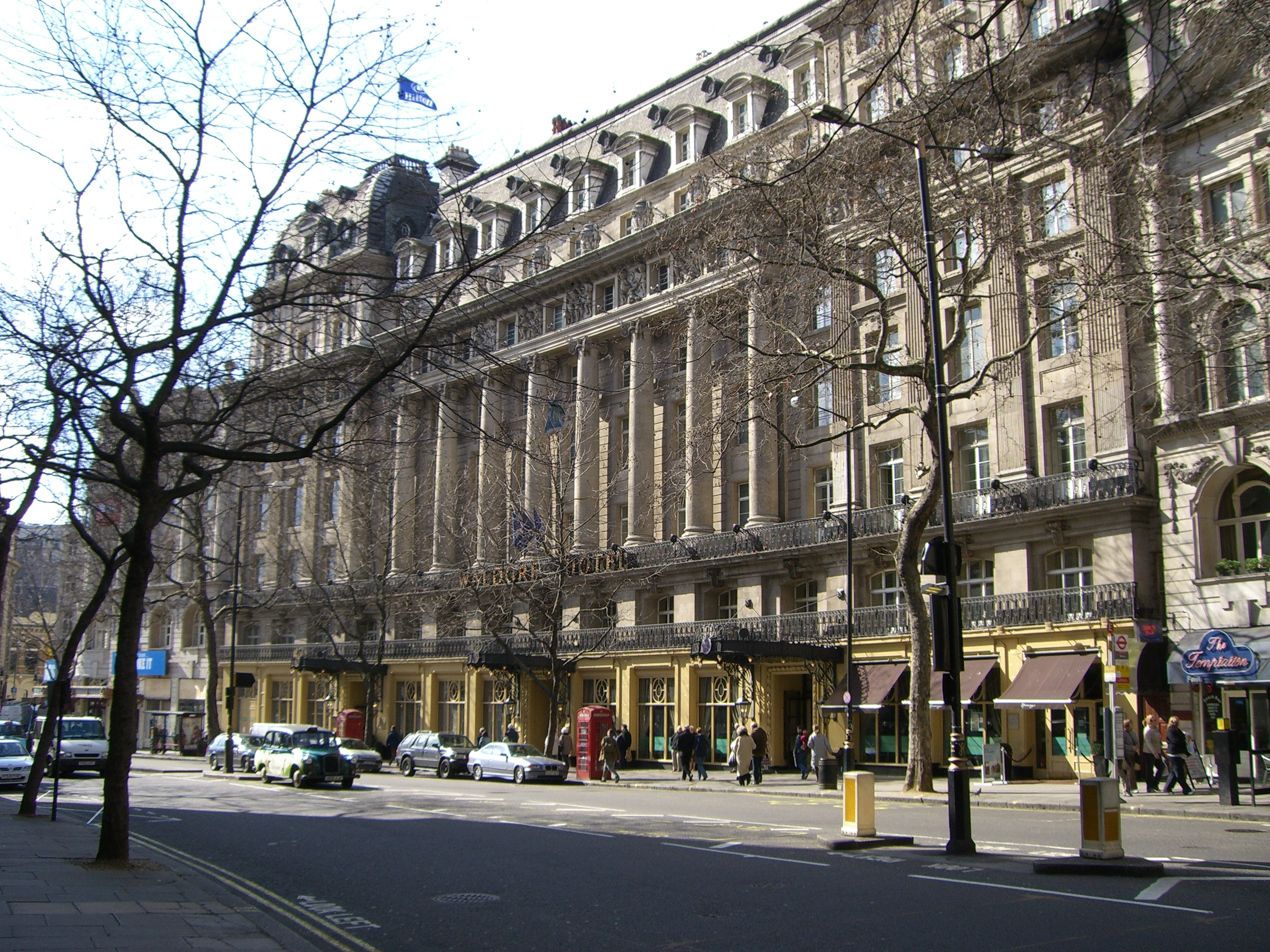
Exterior view of the hotel in 2006

The Waldorf has a 190-foot curving facade made of Aberdeen granite with a frieze of cherubs depicting the arts and sciences. Edward Sanders and Wild hired the young architect Alexander Marshall Mackenzie to build the hotel. Marshall Mackenzie (brother-in-law of distinguished Scottish designer Charles Rennie Mackintosh) went to New York to capture the pioneering new style in luxury.

The Waldorf was built with a Gentlemen's Smoking room (now the Executive Boardroom), a billiard room (now the Executive Lounge), a ladies writing room (now the Aldwych meeting room), a 300 ft. dining space (now the Adelphi Suite), and the beautiful Palm Court.

== Restaurant and bars ==
The hotel's Homage restaurant is inspired by the grand cafés of Europe, serving English food in a modern European style.

The oak-panelled Good Godfrey's Bar and Lounge takes its name from the hotel's original house band, Howard Godfrey and The Waldorfians.

The Wild Monkey is a tropical-themed cocktail bar within the hotel.
