= Jan Miller (actress) =

British actress

Jan Miller is a former British actress, known mainly for film and television work in the late 1950s and early 1960s, in particular her role as WPC Alex Johns in Dixon of Dock Green, from 1962 to 1964.

== Career ==
One of her earliest films was Raising a Riot in 1955, which also featured Kenneth More, Shelagh Fraser, and Miller's sister Mandy Miller.

== Personal life ==
She is the sister of child actress Mandy Miller. She was married to actor Howard Pays (later divorced), whom she met on the set of the daily ITV soap opera Sixpenny Corner. They had at least two children: the actress Amanda Pays, and Debra.

== Selected filmography ==
Films

- Raising a Riot (1955)
- The Secret (1955)
- A Guest for the Gallows (1955)
- The Wedding Dress (1955)
- The Return of Calico Jack (1957)
- Incident in Soho (1961)
- Stranglehold (1963)

Television

- The Vise (1958–1959)
- Plateau of Fear (1961)
- Dixon of Dock Green (1962–1964)
- Compact (1964–1965)
