= The Snorkel =

1958 British film by Guy Green

- Theatrical release poster
- Directed by: Guy Green
- Screenplay by: Peter Myers; Jimmy Sangster
- Story by: Anthony Dawson (from The Snokel by)
- Produced by: Michael Carreras
- Starring: Peter van Eyck; Betta St. John; Mandy Miller
- Cinematography: Jack Asher
- Music by: Francis Chagrin
- Production company: Hammer Films
- Distributed by: Columbia Pictures
- Release dates: 7 July 1958; September 1958 (U.S.)
- Running time: 90 minutes
- Country: United Kingdom
- Language: English
- Budget: £100,000.

The Snorkel is a 1958 British thriller film directed by Guy Green and starring Peter van Eyck, Betta St. John and Mandy Miller. It was a Hammer Films production, and the last film role for Miller.

== Plot ==
Paul Decker kills his wife, Madge, by drugging her and then gassing her in a room in their Italian villa, sealing all the windows and doors but concealing himself under floorboards in the room, covered by a rug and using a snorkel attached to air pipes to breathe while hidden. Household servants discover her body in the morning and as the room has been locked and sealed from the inside, it appears to the local Italian police Inspector and British Consulate Mr. Wilson to be a case of suicide, although no suicide note has been found.

Madge's teenage daughter Candy arrives from England with her dog Toto and travelling companion Jean Edwards, and immediately accuses her stepfather, Decker, of killing her mother, based on the fact that she believes – correctly – that he also killed her father years before and made it look like an accident. Toto senses Decker's presence under the floorboards but is not taken any notice of. It is suggested that Candy and Jean go to America where Decker will join them later, but Candy is determined to investigate further; she goes to Decker's room to look for evidence, but it is Toto that finds the snorkel but again Candy does not recognise its importance and puts it back in a wardrobe. When Decker finds Candy in the room she leaves shortly afterwards, but Toto again finds the snorkel and Decker realises that the dog is proving a problem and poisons him; Candy again senses the truth and accuses Decker of killing her dog, which he denies.

Decker, Jean and Candy go on a beach picnic, and Candy, seeing a man swimming with a snorkel, starts to realise how her mother's murder was carried out; when she then swims out too far, Decker swims out to her, pretending to save her but in reality hoping to drown her and make it look like an accident, but before he can do so Jean also swims out and he gives up on the idea, although again Candy knows what he was trying to do.

Decker decides that he will have to kill Candy, and, establishing an alibi as before, lures her to the villa by telling her that he has found his wife's suicide note and has asked the police Inspector to come over as well. He 'reads' Madge's suicide note to Candy and encourages her to drink a drugged glass of milk; by the time she realises that he has made up the story she is too drowsy and Decker continues to carry out his plan, hiding under the floorboards and the rug as before. This time however Wilson and Jean arrive in time and rescue Candy, although they refuse to believe her story that Decker was trying to kill her, believing her to be unbalanced following her mother's death. She insists that they search the room thoroughly, including moving a heavy cabinet out from the wall, but finally agrees to leave with them. As they leave Decker attempts to come out from his place of concealment, but the cabinet is now over the rug and he can't get out. Candy decides to go back one more time to the room, where she hears Decker calling out for help, and realises what has happened. She leaves him there and at first goes off with Wilson and Jean, leaving Decker to suffocate slowly, but changes her mind and tells the police Inspector to go up to the room in order to solve the case.

== Cast ==
- Peter van Eyck as Paul Decker (as Peter Van Eyck)
- Betta St. John as Jean Edwards (as Betta St.John)
- Mandy Miller as Candy Brown
- Grégoire Aslan as the Inspector (as Gregoire Aslan)
- William Franklyn as Wilson
- Marie Burke as Daily Woman
- Henri Vidon as Italian Gardener (as Henry Vidon)
- Flush as Toto (as John Holmes' dog 'Flush')

== Production ==
In March 1957 it was announced the film would be made by Kenwood Films, a production company of Ken Harper and J. Lee Thompson.

In the book Hammer Films: An Exhaustive Filmography, director Green recalled working on The Snorkel with producer Michael Carreras, whom he called "...very cooperative, as well as a delightful person to be with, and very much responsible for making the film a most pleasant experience. He and I had a great time casting the smaller roles."

The film was the first starring vehicle for actress Mandy Miller; Green described her as "...a natural talent and a very professional girl, but a bit too mature for the part, and all our efforts failed to disguise this." Of star Peter van Eyck, Green said that "he had to do a lot of difficult swimming and, one day after spending most of the morning manfully keeping up with a motorboat from which he was being photographed, Peter said, 'You never asked me if I could swim before giving me the part.' It was true. I didn't."

The budget on The Snorkel was about 20 per cent above the average Hammer Films shoot, due to the extensive location photography (the Italian villa used in the movie was Villa della Pergola, located in Alassio, Liguria's riviera).

The film was reportedly produced without a distribution deal in place. Hammer Films: An Exhaustive Filmography claims that an agreement with Warner Bros. had fallen through and Hammer executive James Carreras (father of producer Michael) only later struck a deal with Columbia Pictures for both The Snorkel and its co-feature in a double-bill, The Camp on Blood Island.

The film's story, credited to '"Anthony Dawson", has sometimes been attributed to Italian Horror director Antonio Margheriti, who often used the anglicised pseudonym "Anthony Dawson." In 2010, however, Margheriti's son denied his father was involved with the production, stating that he did not begin using the name "Anthony Dawson" until 1960. It seems likely that the true author of The Snorkel' s story was actor Anthony Dawson, who also appeared in Hammer's Curse of the Werewolf.

The film had its premier aboard the luxury liner Queen Elizabeth, during a crossing of the Atlantic in May 1958.

Director Guy Green called it "an interesting story."

== Critical reception ==
The Monthly Film Bulletin wrote: "The long opening scene of this film, in spite of its obvious debt to Rififi [1955], makes an intriguing prelude. But the remainder of the story is far below this level and the acting either irritating or ineffectual. Gregoire Aslan is wasted in a small role which gives him no opportunities. The opening and closing scenes (which will not appeal to anyone suffering from claustrophobia) are undoubtedly the best; the matter sandwiched between them amounts to no more than an average thriller."

In The New York Times, critic Richard W. Nason wrote: "Hammer Films apparently has become proficient in the manufacture of motion pictures that are not greatly distinguished but that nonetheless manage to be more absorbing than the usual low-budget program film ... because of the competence of the direction, acting and particularly the editing, the audience is kept awake throughout the running of the twin bill. This is no mean achievement, when you consider the number of ho-hum melodramas that flow from the world's film factories every year ... Anyone who wonders how a simple skin-diving snorkel can be used this way will have to see the film. .. And, once you think about it, it's a very silly way to do away with somebody. Both [this film and its double-bill, The Camp on Blood Island] are for those who are looking to kill time."

In British Sound Films: The Studio Years 1928–1959 David Quinlan rated the film as "average", writing: "Intriguing but slow-moving suspense drama."

Leslie Halliwell said: "Tenuous suspenser which outstays its welcome."

Glenn Erickson of DVDTalk called van Eyck's character "underdeveloped but menacing," and noted that, "Mandy Miller's likeable teen heroine is a doubtful mix of immature emotions and steely resolve, as shown in one poorly handled scene when Candy underreacts to the death of her beloved dog." However, he goes on to write, "The film's good reputation comes from fans that admire the killer's technically elaborate murder scheme, and ace Hammer cameraman Jack Asher's arresting camerawork. A final surprise lifted from The Third Man [1949] could have provided a perfect shock finish, but the movie goes on a bit longer, clearly to tie up some moral loose ends for the censors."

John M. Miller, wrote for Turner Classic Movies: "The Snorkel opens with one of the more memorable pre-credits sequences to be found in a thriller ... While not a classic, this clever and twisted thriller, as well as Peter van Eyck's chilling performance, is overdue for greater exposure."
