= Howard Pays =

English actor (1927–2002)

- in Heavens Above! (1963)
- Born: Harold Reginald Pays; 11 June 1927; West Ham, Essex, England
- Died: 12 April 2002 (aged 74); Alton, Hampshire, England
- Occupations: Actor, theatrical agent
- Spouse: Jan Miller
- Children: Amanda Pays

Howard Pays (11 June 1927 – 12 April 2002) was an English actor who, in partnership with Freddy Vale, started the London-based talent agency CCA.

== Early life ==
Howard Pays was born in West Ham, Essex on 11 June 1927.

== Career ==
His first television role was playing the part of Bill Norton in the 1955–56 ITV daily soap opera Sixpenny Corner. All 181 episodes have been announced as lost by their producer, BBC Television.

After retiring from acting, he established a talent agency in London with Freddy Vale. The agency did well, representing clients such as actor John Rhys-Davies and cinematographer Tony Pierce-Roberts.

== Personal life ==
Pays met his future wife, Jan Miller, on the set of Sixpenny Corner. One of their daughters, Amanda Pays, also became an actor. They had at least one other child, a daughter called Debra.

His second wife was Lynne.

Pays died on 12 April 2002 in Alton, Hampshire, of cancer.

== Filmography ==
Film
Year	Title	Role	Notes
1958	The Strange World of Planet X	Young Man in Pub	Uncredited
1958	A Night to Remember	Fifth Officer Harold Lowe	
1959	Horrors of the Black Museum	Patrol Constable No. 2	
1959	Too Many Crooks	Policeman at traffic lights	Uncredited
1960	Jungle Street	Sergeant Pelling	
1960	Urge to Kill	Charles Ramskill	
1960	Cone of Silence	Steward #2	
1960	Just Joe	Rodney	
1961	Edgar Wallace Mysteries	Police Sgt.	'The Sinister Man', episode
1961	Never Back Losers	Freddie	
1961	Dangerous Afternoon	Jack Loring	
1962	The Password Is Courage	Mansard	
1963	Two Left Feet	Peter	Uncredited
1963	Heavens Above!	Astronaut	Uncredited
1964	Ring of Spies	P.O. Garton	Uncredited
1966	Ambush at Devil's Gap	Stefan Valdar	
1968	Attack on the Iron Coast	Lieutenant Graham	(final film role)
Television
Year	Title	Role	Notes
1955	Sixpenny Corner	Bill Norton	20 episodes
1956	The Adventures of Sir Lancelot	Richard/Alfred	"Double Identity"
1960	Danger Man	Holst	"The Lonely Chair"
