= Raising a Riot =

1955 British film by Wendy Toye

- Directed by: Wendy Toye
- Written by: Ian Dalrymple; Hugh Perceval
- Based on: Raising a Riot by Alfred Toombs
- Produced by: Ian Dalrymple; Hugh Perceval
- Starring: Kenneth More; Shelagh Fraser; Mandy Miller
- Cinematography: Christopher Challis
- Edited by: Bert Rule
- Music by: Bruce Montgomery
- Production companies: London Films; Wessex Films
- Distributed by: British Lion Films
- Release date: 21 February 1955
- Running time: 90 minutes
- Country: United Kingdom
- Language: English
- Box office: £231,148 (UK)

Raising a Riot is a 1955 British comedy film directed by Wendy Toye and starring Kenneth More, Shelagh Fraser and Mandy Miller. It was written by Ian Dalrymple and Hugh Perceval based on the 1949 novel Raising a Riot by Alfred Toombs. A naval officer attempts to look after his three children in his wife's absence

== Plot summary ==
Commander Anthony Kent of the Royal Navy and his wife May have three children, ranging from five to eleven years: Peter, Anne and Fusty. Kent comes home after three years abroad with no idea how to handle the children. When Mary has to fly to Canada, Peter takes his children to his father's new country home, which turns out to be a windmill. They end up clashing with an American family in the neighbourhood.

== Cast ==
- Kenneth More as Anthony Kent
- Shelagh Fraser as Mary Kent
- Mandy Miller as Anne Kent
- Gary Billings as Peter Kent
- Fusty Bentine as Fusty Kent
- Ronald Squire as Grampy
- Olga Lindo as Aunt Maud
- Lionel Murton as Hary
- Mary Laura Wood as Jacqueline
- Jan Miller as Sue
- Nora Nicholson as Miss Pettigrew
- Anita Sharp-Bolster as Mrs Buttons
- Michael Bentine as the Professor
- Dorothy Dewhurst as mother
- Robin Brown as Junior
- Sam Kydd as messenger

== Production ==
The film was based on a 1949 novel by American writer Alfred Toombs, based on Toombs' real life experience of having to look after his children after having been away from them at war for three years. The book was adapted into a stage play by Tom Taggart in 1952.

One of the children is an uncredited Caroline John, who would later play Liz Shaw in Doctor Who.

In June 1954, filming was about to start on The Alcock and Brown Story for Alexander Korda, to be directed by Ken Annakin, produced by Lord Brabourne and Ian Dalrymple and star Kenneth More and Denholm Elliott in the title roles. It would be made under Dalrymple's Wessex Films banner. However Korda then went bankrupt, resulting in the receivers being brought in and the Alcock and Brown movie being cancelled. Lord Barbourne and Ian Dalrymple arranged with the receiver for that film's unit to be reassigned to a lower budgeted movie instead, Raising a Riot. Kenneth More agreed to star and Annakin was asked to take over the direction. Annakin wrote in his memoirs, "The idea of ‘going back’ to a small family comedy did not thrill me" (he started his directing career with the Hugget family movies) "and when I discovered a young woman called Wendy Toye had actually been preparing this project for months. I turned the offer down flat." Toye directed the film.

Toye called Dalrymple "the most fabulous film producer. He did everything in the world for me. And he really encouraged me and it was his idea for me to do Raising a Riot. And he asked me to show the story to Kenny More and see if I could get him to do it and I did. It was wonderful that he had such faith in me."

It was shot at Shepperton Studios near London with sets designed by the art director Joseph Bato.

Toye said working with children was not difficult "because I chose them very specially. They weren’t acting children, they weren’t from a school of acting. Not that I’m against that but they were the sons and daughters of actors, you get a feeling of it at home, and Jackie Billings' little son was the boy and Michael Bentine’s little daughter Posty." She recalled the film with fondness "because Kenny is so good in it."

== Reception ==
=== Box office ===
The film was the eighth most popular movie at the British box office in 1955. Kine Weekly called it a "money maker".

According to the National Film Finance Corporation, the film made a comfortable profit. This success was attributed to More's appeal.

=== Critical ===
The Monthly Film Bulletin wrote: "This unpretentious film contains a good deal of simple charm and affectionate humour. The central idea, of a man having to cope with woman's work for a while and finding it exhausting, leads to a number of entertaining episodes. Unfortunately, the artificiality of the incidents centred on the American wife stands out in contrast, and in the latter half of the film one feels the unwelcome intrusion of "plot" into a comedy previously developed agreeably from natural situations. The film finally peters out in a series of irrelevant gags and gimmicks. The direction, though, is well-paced, and exploits the central situation with obvious relish."

Kine Weekly wrote: "Harum-scarum, yet intensity human technicolor domestic comedy. ... Picture is made up of a series of gags, but all are good and securely attached to a strong and compelling sentimental thread. ... The exterior settings are delightful and, together with the natural dialogue, smooth the round off the polished rustic pump."

The New York Times wrote, "Withal, it makes agreeable entertainment. Mr. More is a comical chap, particularly when he has a dog to cope with, as he had in the memorable Genevieve... Raising a Riot is an amiable little film".

Variety wrote: "The main purpose of Raising a Riot appears to be to exploit the personality of Kenneth More. This British star, with two major comedy hits (Genevieve and Doctor in the House) to his credit, has become a major b.o. name here and this pic is nothing more than a frank admit to cash in on that. The trouble with the film is that it lacks Anything like a story. It is just a single situation, moderately amusing in parts, but totally inadequate to sustain a feature pic...Within the strict limitations imposed by the script, the star does remarkably well. More’s timing is flawless and his keen sense of humor is never allowed to flag.

The Radio Times called it "an inconsequential, one-joke comedy, kept moving by the polished More, but old-fashioned and rather flat".
