= The Secret (1955 film) =

1955 British film directed by Cy Endfield

- Directed by: Cy Endfield
- Screenplay by: Cy Endfield; Robert Brenon (play)
- Produced by: S. Benjamin Fisz
- Starring: Sam Wanamaker; Mandy Miller; André Morell
- Cinematography: Jack Asher
- Edited by: Jack Slade
- Music by: Phil Cardew
- Distributed by: Eros Films (UK)
- Release date: June 1955 (UK)
- Running time: 80 minutes
- Language: English

The Secret is a 1955 British second feature ('B') crime drama written and directed by Cy Endfield (as C. Raker Endfield) and starring Sam Wanamaker, Mandy Miller, and André Morell.

== Plot ==
Nick Delaney, an American stranded in England without money, meets a woman who has smuggled diamonds into the country inside a teddy bear. But his hopes for financial aid are shattered when she is pushed from a cliff. Delaney then finds himself the prime suspect. He finally gets his hands on the gems but loses them to a gang of crooks. Can Delaney prove his innocence and shop the crooks to the police?

== Cast ==
- Sam Wanamaker as Nick Delaney
- Mandy Miller as Katie Martin
- André Morell as Chief Inspector Blake
- Marian Spencer as Aunt Doris
- Jan Miller as Margaret
- Richard O'Sullivan as John Martin
- Wyndham Goldie as Doctor Scott
- Henry Caine as Superintendent
- Aimée Delamain as Miss Lyons
- John Miller as toy shop assistant
- Harold Berens as Frank Farmer

== Critical reception ==
The Monthly Film Bulletin wrote: "The best element in this story is the child unwittingly involved in adult intrigues, but the handling of it is perfunctory; script and direction emphasise the interesting but less important character of Nick Delaney, strongly played by Sam Wanamaker. The Brighton settings are dull, and there is little in the handling to hold one's interest."

Kine Weekly wrote: "The picture has a crime fringe, but it is its agreeable domestic asides rather than the hint of homicide that provides most of the entertainment. Sam Wanamaker has his moments, but is too obviously a decent guy at heart to lead one up the garden as Nick; Andre Morell has a professional air as Blake, and Harold Berens introduces a neat and amusing cameo as wide boy Farmer, but it is Mandy as Katie, and Richard O'Sullivan as John, who steal the honours. The backgrounds are authentic, but the Eastman Color photography is inclined to be a little hazy."

In British Sound Films: The Studio Years 1928–1959 David Quinlan rated the film as "average", writing: "Slow thriller with one or two striking performances."

TV Guide called the film "slow going, with a few moments of excitement."

Sky Movies called it a "taut thriller."
