= Twin Suns =

- Star Wars Rebels episode
- Obi-Wan Kenobi and Maul face off on the planet of Tatooine.
- Episode no.: Season 3 Episode 20
- Directed by: Dave Filoni
- Written by: Dave Filoni; Henry Gilroy
- Production code: 320
- Original air date: March 18, 2017
- Running time: 21 minutes

Episode chronology
← Previous "Double Agent Droid"	Next → "Zero Hour"
- Star Wars Rebels season 3

"Twin Suns" is the twentieth episode of the third season of the American 3D animated science fiction television series Star Wars Rebels. The episode was written and directed by series creator Dave Filoni, with co-executive producer Henry Gilroy serving as co-writer. The episode originally aired in the United States on March 18, 2017, on Disney XD.

The series takes place five years before the original Star Wars film in 5 BBY (Before the Battle of Yavin), when the Galactic Empire is hunting down the last of the Jedi while a fledgling rebellion against the Empire is emerging. It follows a small band of Rebels who conduct covert operations on various imperial-controlled planets. This episode takes place two years before the original Star Wars film in 2 BBY. In this episode, Ezra Bridger (voiced by Taylor Gray) travels to the desert planet of Tatooine to find Obi-Wan "Ben" Kenobi (voiced by Stephen Stanton), who he believes is being hunted by Maul (voiced by Sam Witwer). Maul eventually finds Kenobi, and the two face off in a lightsaber duel. The episode concludes a storyline between Kenobi and Maul that was first introduced in Star Wars: Episode I – The Phantom Menace and expanded upon in Star Wars: The Clone Wars and Star Wars Rebels.

The meeting between Kenobi and Maul was first shown in a mid-season trailer in January 2017. Filoni was heavily involved in the creation of the episode, believing it would have major implications for all characters involved. Stephen Stanton, who also voiced AP-5 and Tarkin in Rebels, was cast to voice an older Ben Kenobi while Sam Witwer returned for his final performance as Maul on the show. In the United States, "Twin Suns" was viewed by approximately 400,000 viewers. The episode was well-received by critics, who praised its writing and Stanton's performance as Kenobi.

== Plot ==
The episode starts with Maul lost in the deserts of Tatooine, in search of Obi-Wan Kenobi. In frustration and rage, he shouts Kenobi's name, which was echoed through the desert. After contemplating that he does not want to die in the desert, he attempts to draw Kenobi out of hiding by activating a fragment of a Sith holocron.

Ezra Bridger sees a recoding of Kenobi from Kanan Jarrus's Jedi holocron. He tells the Ghost crew that they must go to Tatooine to save Kenobi from Maul. The crew refuses, believing Kenobi died during Order 66 and that the message is a trap set by Maul. Ezra and Chopper nonetheless sneak away and head to Tatooine, but their ship is destroyed by Tusken Raiders soon after they arrive.

Guided by the holocron, Ezra and Chopper set off across the desert in search of Kenobi. After hours of aimless wandering, Chopper runs out of power and shuts down. Ezra is then haunted by visions of Maul, who tells him he failed his loved ones. Shortly afterward, Ezra passes out. Upon awakening, he finds that Kenobi has rescued him and Chopper. Ezra tries to warn Kenobi that Maul is after him and asks him to help the Rebellion. However, Kenobi refuses, saying that the Rebellion already has what it needs to fight the Empire. He also has no intention of fighting Maul, though he knows it is now inevitable.

As Maul finds the pair, Kenobi sends Ezra and Chopper to safety and faces off with Maul in a lightsaber duel. After a period of tension, Maul strikes first but is quickly countered and defeated by Kenobi. Before Maul dies, Kenobi stays by his side and reveals to him that he is watching over whom he believes is the Chosen One, with Maul's last words being, "He will avenge us".

Ezra and Chopper return to base on Maul's ship. Ezra tells the rebels that Maul is gone and apologizes for sneaking away. Meanwhile, Kenobi watches a young Luke Skywalker at the Lars moisture farm from a distance.

== Production ==
=== Development and writing ===
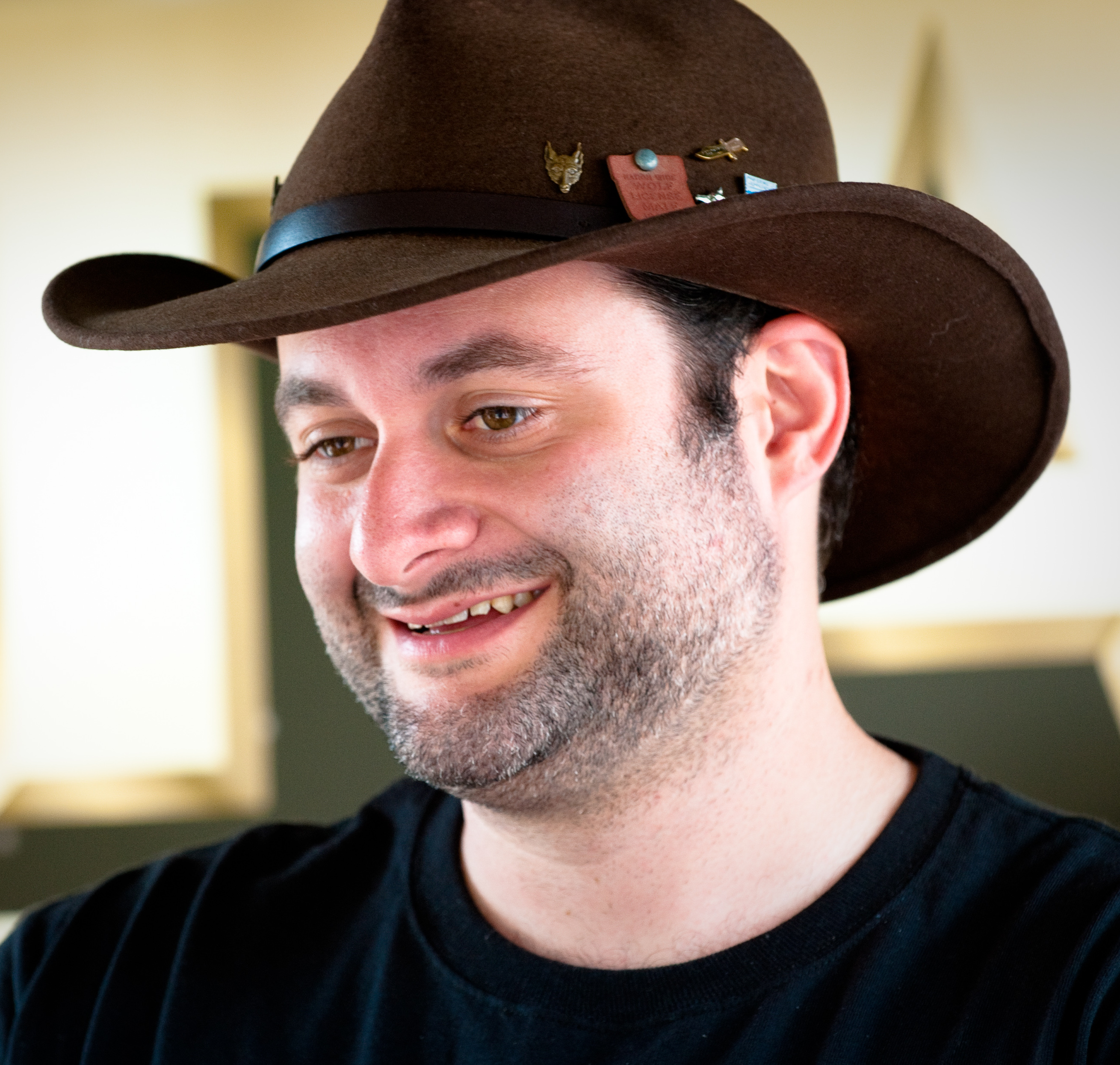
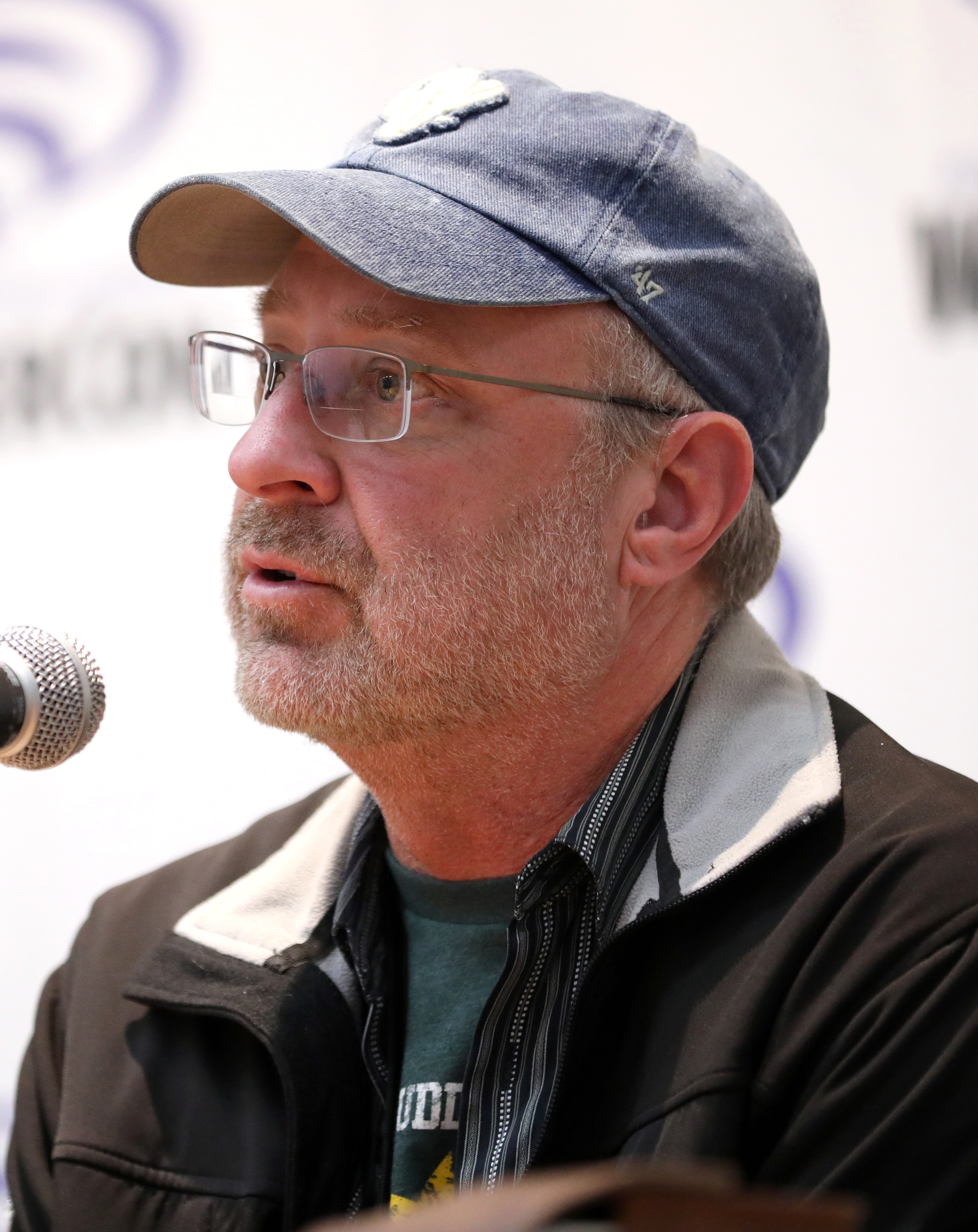
The episode was written and directed by series creator Dave Filoni (top), and co-written by co-executive producer Henry Gilroy (bottom).

"Twin Suns" was written and directed by Star Wars Rebels (2014-2018) creator Dave Filoni, and co-written by series co-executive producer Henry Gilroy. Filoni was heavily involved in the creation of the episode on the belief that it would have major implications for all characters involved, including Ezra Bridger, the show's main protagonist. He personally storyboarded every scene beginning with Ezra's arrival on Tatooine, wanting to frame Ezra's quest to find Obi-Wan Kenobi as a step along his path to becoming a Jedi, which Filoni believes is "about selflessness and sacrificing to help others". The episode's story was worked out as early as August 2015, with its script being ready later that year. Design work finished by early 2016; character art from February 2016 was later uploaded to StarWars.com.

Filoni had also directed the previous Cartoon Network animated series Star Wars: The Clone Wars (2008-2014), and felt a responsibility to end Darth Maul's story after bringing back the character in that series. (Note: Darth Maul was presumed dead after his defeat by Obi-Wan Kenobi in Star Wars Episode I: The Phantom Menace (1999). However, Maul was brought back in season 4 of Star Wars: The Clone Wars (2008-2014).) The Rebels production team consulted the Lucasfilm Story Group, which did not have any plans for Maul to appear in future Star Wars media. George Lucas had originally intended to bring Maul back in his plans for the Star Wars sequel trilogy as the universe's godfather of crime and master of Darth Talon, but those plans changed after he sold Lucasfilm to The Walt Disney Company in 2012. Maul's debut in the second season of Rebels was thus intended to be a one-off appearance; his death was to be at the hands of Darth Vader, but the writers felt that the two characters lacked an emotional connection and that Maul's death would overcomplicate an already loaded episode with Ahsoka Tano's confrontation with Vader. Maul continued to play a minor role in the third season, which Filoni decided would culminate in a meeting between Maul and Kenobi. Pablo Hidalgo, a member of the Lucasfilm Story Group, said the creative team wanted to end Maul's story in animation to match the medium he was resurrected in. Plans for Maul's involvement in the galaxy's criminal underworld, as depicted in the live-action film Solo: A Star Wars Story (2018), were left for the time period between The Clone Wars and Rebels. Maul would be later considered to appear in the Disney+ miniseries Obi-Wan Kenobi (2022), but director Deborah Chow chose to not use him as she believed Filoni "did a beautiful job telling that story already".

The duel between Kenobi and Maul lasts for less than three seconds, ending with a decisive defeat for Maul. The writers knew the decision would be controversial but decided to go against the expectation of a protracted duel in favor of emphasizing the tension behind it, which they believed would better convey the characters' growth. Co-writer Henry Gilroy described the prolonged tension as the two characters "playing [the duel] out in their head" by drawing from their previous encounters. Furthermore, the episode drew inspiration from the film Seven Samurai (1954) by Akira Kurosawa, whose films were cited as major inspirations by Lucas during the development of the original Star Wars film (later known as Star Wars Episode IV – A New Hope, 1977). Specifically, Filoni likened Kenobi to the Seven Samurai character Kyuzo, who avoids fighting, knowing the resulting battle would be swift. He also compared the episode's duel to one in the film, where the samurai "is moving with intention and grace," in contrast to his angry opponent, "who is moving his feet a lot and does not have a steady position". This contrast is seen between Kenobi and Maul, and is meant to highlight the former's evolution from a "young brash kid that went into a fight with Maul" to an enlightened master only fighting to protect others, while depicting Maul as a mostly static character consumed by revenge. Attention was also given to Kenobi's movements in the lead up to the duel, which again symbolized his evolution; he first takes up the pose of a young Obi-Wan, before switching to the one he uses against Darth Vader in A New Hope; reacting to Maul's movements, he shifts into his final pose, which is that of his former master, Qui-Gon Jinn. This pose baits Maul into attacking Kenobi with the same move he used to kill Qui-Gon Jinn, (Note: As depicted in Star Wars: Episode I – The Phantom Menace (1999).) which Kenobi predicts and counters, resulting in Maul's defeat. Overall, Filoni hoped the duel could represent one of the most important conflicts in the Star Wars saga, which was "the difference between the Jedi and the Sith [...] the Jedi become selfless and the Sith remain selfish".

In the final scene of the episode, the silhouette of a young Luke Skywalker is seen running around the Lars farm while Kenobi watches from a distance. Luke is depicted at the same age is Ezra, whose animation model was reused for the silhouette. According to Filoni, the scene was partly based on his philosophy of "[looking] at every episode of Rebels as if you've never seen Star Wars before"; it would give new viewers some needed context as to who Kenobi was protecting while satisfying existing fans with a returning character to end off the story. The scene also features the voice of Aunt Beru, played by Shelagh Fraser in A New Hope, from the film's archival footage.

The original cut of "Twin Suns" was 35 minutes; many scenes were subsequently removed to keep the story focused and to fit the show's 21-minute runtime. The episode originally featured a variety of visions and apparitions haunting Maul while on his journey, including appearances from Satine Kryze and Savage Opress, one of Maul's victims and Maul's brother respectively, who last appeared in The Clone Wars. However, even as Opress made it to the design phase, Filoni ultimately decided against the appearances, as they could confuse and alienate new Star Wars fans in an already lengthy episode. Hidalgo believed the "stripped down" episode served to strengthen its core story.

=== Casting ===
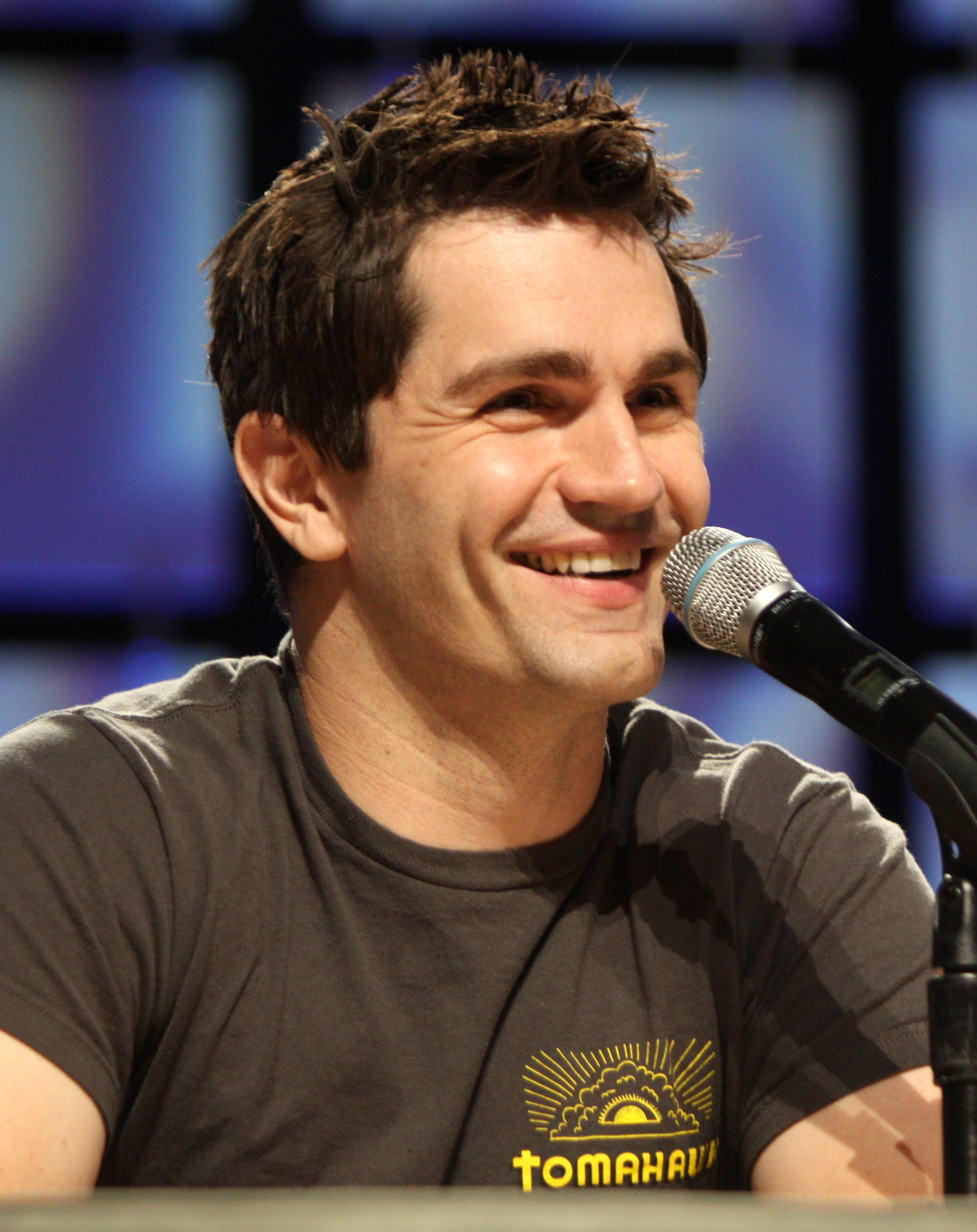
Sam Witwer returned for his final performance as Maul on the show.

Prior to the conception of "Twin Suns", the showrunners had expressed interest in having Ewan McGregor, who portrayed Obi-Wan Kenobi in the Star Wars prequel trilogy, reprise his role on Rebels in a voice performance, as had been done with Billy Dee Williams as Lando Calrissian, James Earl Jones as Darth Vader, and Frank Oz as Yoda. Ultimately, Stephen Stanton, who also voiced AP-5 and Grand Moff Tarkin on the show, was cast to voice an older Ben Kenobi by mimicking the character's portrayal by Alec Guinness in the original trilogy. Stanton had previously voiced Kenobi for the original Star Wars: Battlefront II (2005) video game and subsequent Star Wars video games. He was first considered for the role after a conversation with Filoni during a recording session. Stanton was discussing the possibility of Meebur Gascon, a character from The Clone Wars, appearing in the 2015 video game Disney Infinity 3.0; he wanted to voice the character in addition to his role as Kenobi in the game. Filoni asked for his Kenobi voice, and co-star Vanessa Marshall prompted Stanton to say Kenobi's line from a A New Hope describing Mos Eisley as a "wretched hive of scum and villainy". Filoni was impressed and invited Stanton to record test tracks for Kenobi, who was to appear in a yet-to-be-approved Rebels episode. A few weeks later, the episode was approved, and Stanton accepted the offer to voice Kenobi. In preparation for the role, Stanton studied archival footage of Guinness, along with his performances from the original trilogy; he later noted the importance of studying the evolution of Guinness' character across the three films as opposed to only looking at A New Hope. The voice of James Arnold Taylor, who voiced a younger version of Kenobi in The Clone Wars, is also heard in the holocron message played by Ezra at the beginning of the episode.

"Twin Suns" marked Sam Witwer's final performance as Maul in Rebels, a role he had voiced since Maul's return in The Clone Wars. Witwer was accepting of Maul's death, having been prepared for it ever since he was called back for Rebels; he stated in an interview that his character "had more than his fair share at trying to make his mark on the Star Wars universe". With regards to Maul's future, Witwer described himself as only one of the character's "temporary caretakers", and believed that the episode would probably be his last as Maul. He was nonetheless proud of his contributions to the character and would be willing to return to the role if called upon. Witwer would indeed return as the voice of Maul in Solo alongside Ray Park, who portrayed Maul in The Phantom Menace. Witwer also voiced Maul in the final story arc of The Clone Wars, the Siege of Mandalore, released in 2020. He reprised his role in the Disney+ animated series Star Wars: Maul – Shadow Lord (2026-present).

=== Music ===
Series composer Kevin Kiner composed the score for "Twin Suns" by combining motifs from familiar Star Wars music with new compositions. The episode also features "The Force Theme" by John Williams, which plays over the closing credits.

== Promotion and release ==
Clips from the episode depicting Kenobi and Maul first appeared in a trailer promoting the second half of season three. Released in January 2017, the trailer drew anticipation and speculation from fans. A brief preview of the episode was released a week before its airing.

"Twin Suns" first aired in the United States on Disney XD on March 18, 2017, and was broadcast in the United Kingdom five days later, on March 23.

== Reception ==
According to Nielsen ratings, the episode's initial broadcast in the United States was viewed by approximately 400 thousand viewers.

The episode was generally well-received by critics, who praised the episode's characterization of Kenobi and Maul and its emotional conclusion of the two characters' storyline. They also felt Ezra was effectively incorporated into the storyline and further developed ahead of the season finale. Stanton and Witwer's vocal performances were also praised as "bringing out both Maul's madness and Kenobi's weary resilience". Reviewers particularly noted the similarity of Stanton's voice to Alec Guinness' in A New Hope. Both Stanton's performance and the episode's writing were credited for showing Kenobi's transition leading up to the original trilogy and enriching its story. "Twin Suns" also received praise for its visuals, particularly its depiction of the desert planet of Tatooine.

Fans had mixed reactions to the duel, though it was well-received by reviewers, who believed other aspects of the episode lessened the need for a protracted duel. In a review for Den of Geek, Megan Crouse gave the episode a 4 out of 5 star rating, finding "so much to unpack that I hardly mourn the loss of a fight scene". Kevin Johnson of The A.V. Club gave an "A−" rating, focusing on Ezra's characterization in the episode; he described the final battle as "hilarious, bold, and humbly ironic" in upending the audience's expectations, believing it fittingly downplayed Maul's importance in the overall Star Wars story. While IGN's Eric Goldman gave the episode an 8.8 out of 10 rating, he took issue with the episode's promotion, believing the duel was too heavily promoted given the outcome.

"Twin Suns" was listed as one of the "10 Most Essential Episodes of Star Wars Rebels" by /Film. In a review of the Star Wars Rebels season 3 disc set, the New York Daily News named the episode one of "the two best episodes of the season".
