= Dangerous Afternoon =

1961 British film by Charles Saunders

- Directed by: Charles Saunders
- Written by: Gerald Anstruther (play); Brandon Fleming
- Produced by: Guido Coen
- Starring: Ruth Dunning; Nora Nicholson; Joanna Dunham; Howard Pays
- Cinematography: Geoffrey Faithfull
- Edited by: Peter Bezencenet
- Music by: Norman Percival
- Distributed by: Bryanston Films (UK)
- Release date: 1961
- Running time: 62 minutes
- Country: United Kingdom
- Language: English
- Budget: £17,000

Dangerous Afternoon is a 1961 British 'B' crime film directed by Charles Saunders and starring Ruth Dunning and Nora Nicholson. The screenplay was by Brandon Fleming based on the 1951 play of the same title by Gerald Anstruther.

== Plot ==
On her release from prison, Jean Berry sets out to find escaped convict Irma Randall, with whom she has a score to settle. She discovers Irma is running a boarding house for retired lady criminals, under the assumed name of Letty Frost. When Jean blackmails Lefty, she attempts to poison Jean.

== Cast ==
- Ruth Dunning as Miss Letty Frost
- Nora Nicholson as Mrs Louisa Sprule
- Joanna Dunham as Freda
- Howard Pays as Jack Loring
- May Hallatt as Miss Burge
- Gwenda Wilson as Miss Jean Berry
- Ian Colin as Reverend Everard Porson
- Gladys Henson as Miss Cassell
- Barbara Everest as Mrs Judson
- Max Brimmell as Dr Spalding
- James Raglan as Sir Phillip Morstan
- Trevor Reid as Inspector Craven
- Jerold Wells as George "Butch" Birling

== Production ==
It was primarily filmed at Twickenham Studios, with the shops next to Strawberry Hill railway station, notably the chemist's in Wellesley Parade, being used for external location shots.

== Critical reception ==
The Monthly Film Bulletin wrote: "A home for elderly lady crooks who cannot always refrain from plying their old trades has comic possibilities, but these are largely cancelled out by a poor script and clumsy direction. That the film should still survive as a passable "support" is a tribute to brevity and skilful acting."

The Radio Times Guide to Films gave the film 2/5 stars, writing: "Former editor Charles Saunders turned out a series of unexceptional movies after taking to directing, including this negligible crime drama. The story ... began life on stage, and Saunders does little to open out the forgotten play."
