= Plateau of Fear =

British television series

- Genre: Science fiction
- Written by: Malcolm Stuart Fellows; Ross Sutherland
- Directed by: Kim Mills
- Starring: Gerald Flood; John Barron; Ferdy Mayne
- Country of origin: United Kingdom
- Original language: English
- No. of series: 1
- No. of episodes: 6

Production
- Producer: Guy Verney
- Running time: 30 minutes
- Production company: ABC Weekend Television

Original release
- Network: ITV
- Release: 24 September – 29 October 1961

Plateau of Fear is a British science-fiction television drama series which aired in a six parts on ITV in 1961. A British journalist investigates as a series of attacks on a nuclear power station, located in the Andes in South America, which he comes to believe may have been caused by some giant beast.

== Cast ==
- Gerald Flood as Mark Bannerman
- John Barron as Dr. Miguel Aranda
- Ferdy Mayne as General Villagran
- Richard Coleman as Ralph Morton
- Stewart Guidotti as Peter Blake
- Jan Miller as Dr. Susan Fraser
- Peter Allenby as Lorca
- Maureen Lindholm as Julietta Aranda
- Roger Delgado as General Perera

== Sequels ==
Flood and Guidotti appeared as Bannerman and Blake in two further series, City Beneath the Sea and Secret Beneath the Sea.

== Bibliography ==
- Ellen Baskin. Serials on British Television, 1950-1994. Scolar Press, 1996.
