= Sixpenny Corner =

British TV soap opera (1955–1956)

Sixpenny Corner is the UK's first daily TV soap opera, broadcast by ITV from September 1955 until June 1956. The programme was created by Jonquil Antony and Hazel Adair; the latter later co-created Crossroads. The 15-minute episodes centred on a recently married young couple, Bill and Sally Norton, played by Howard Pays and Patricia Dainton. The setting was the fictional rural town of Springwood, where Bill ran a small garage business at Sixpenny Corner.

All of the 180 episodes are lost.

== Cast ==
The cast includes:

- Patricia Dainton as Sally Norton
- Howard Pays as Bill Norton
- Robert Webber as Charles Norton (Bill's father)
- Betty Bowden as Dora Sharpe (Sally's mother)
- Robert Desmond as Stan Norman (Bill's brother)
- Shirley Mitchell as Yvonne Sharp (Sally's sister)
- Stuart Saunders as Uncle Fred (Bill's uncle)
- Olive Milbourne as Aunt Mabel (Bill's aunt)
- Walter Horsbrugh as Mr. Sharpe (Sally's father)
- Christine Pollon as Grete Elder
- Elizabeth Gott as Mrs. Boyes
- Edward Judd as Denis Boyes
- Bernard Fox as Tom Norton (Bill's youngest brother)
- Vi Stevens as Rosie Chubb
- Laurence Shiel as Dr. Kevin O'Shea
- Seymour Green as M. Louis Delmore
- Jan Miller as Moira O'Shea
- Mysie Monte as Mrs. La Trobe
- Margaret Boyd as Nanny
- Anne Warren as Joanie Chubb
- Michael Collins as Dr. Tim O'Shea
- Tony Randall as Arthur Bugle
- John Charlesworth as Eddy Perkins
- Liz Fraser as Julie Perkins
- Ronald Cardew as Brigadier La Trobe
