= Mandy Miller =

English 1950s child actress (born 1944)

- Born: Carmen Isabella Miller; 23 July 1944 (age 82); Weston-super-Mare, Somerset, England
- Years active: 1951–1963
- Spouse: Christopher Davey (m. 1965)
- Children: 3

Mandy Miller (born Carmen Isabella Miller on 23 July 1944) is an English former child actress who made a number of films in the 1950s. She recorded the 1956 song "Nellie the Elephant".

== Early life ==
Carmen Isabella Miller, known professionally as Mandy Miller, was born in 1944 in Weston-super-Mare, Somerset, England.

== Career ==
Miller's first film appearance was at the age of six playing Gladdie, who helps Sidney Stratton escape an angry mob in The Man in the White Suit. She says she got the part purely by chance while accompanying her father on a visit to Ealing Studios. In the canteen, director Alexander Mackendrick was having coffee. On seeing Mandy, he said, "That’s a funny face, I could use that funny face in my next film."

The following year, an Ealing casting agent invited her to screen test for the title role in Mandy, also directed by Mackendrick. Mackendrick said of the test,

Mandy's performance was so astonishing that the unit was struck rigid, holding its breath, with this electrifying silence on the floor. I was in tears. Douglas Slocombe was in tears. And afterwards both of us said, cancel the rest, she's it.

Her lead role in Mandy is a deaf-mute child whose parents (played by Terence Morgan and Phyllis Calvert) quarrel over her upbringing.

Her next film was Background (1953), with two other child actors, in a film about a well-to-do middle-class family breaking up because of an impending divorce. Valerie Hobson plays her mother. In 1954, she starred in Adventure in the Hopfields, a film made for the Children's Film Foundation. Her lighter roles include Raising a Riot (1955) starring Kenneth More. She has co-starred with, among others, Joan Greenwood, Cecil Parker, Godfrey Tearle, Thora Hird and Sam Wanamaker. She also appeared in television dramas.

Miller made two popular single records: "Snowflakes" and "Nellie the Elephant", the latter produced by George Martin.

== Personal life ==
Miller's sister is actress Jan Miller, and her niece is actress Amanda Pays.

In 1965, she married Christopher Davey, an architect, and had three children.

== Filmography ==
- The Man in the White Suit (1951) as Gladdie
- I Believe In You (1952) as Child
- Mandy (1952) as Mandy
- Background (1953) as Linda Lomax
- Adventure in the Hopfields (1954) as Jenny Quin
- Dance Little Lady (1954) as Jill Gordon
- The Secret (1955) as Katie Martin
- Raising a Riot (1955) as Anne Kent
- The Feminine Touch (1956) as Jessie
- Child in the House (1956) as Elizabeth Lorimer
- The Snorkel (1958) as Candy Brown

TV series that she appeared in included The Avengers, The Saint and The Third Man.
