= Shelagh Fraser =

English actress (1920–2000)

- Fraser in Star Wars (1977)
- Born: Sheila Mary Fraser; 25 November 1920; Purley, Surrey, England
- Died: 29 August 2000 (aged 79); London, England
- Occupation: Actress
- Years active: 1944–2000
- Spouse: Anthony Squire (m. 1961, divorced)
- Relatives: Moyra Fraser (sister)

Sheila Mary Fraser (25 November 1920 – 29 August 2000) was an English actress. She is best known for her roles in the television serial A Family at War (1970–1971) and as Luke Skywalker's Aunt Beru in Star Wars (1977).

== Early life ==
Shelagh Fraser was born in Purley, Surrey, on 25 November 1920. Her parents were John Newton Mappin Fraser and Vera Eleanor (née Beardshaw). Her father was a director of the jewellery company Mappin & Webb, and the family was sent to Australia to establish a branch of the family business there. They returned to the United Kingdom in 1924.

As a child, Shelagh suffered from spinal tuberculosis, but overcame the debilitating effects of the illness. She was educated at St Christopher's School in Kingswood and won a scholarship to train as an actor at Croydon Repertory Theatre Drama School. It was there that Fraser made her first stage appearance in 1938.

== Career ==
Fraser had a wide range of roles on the stage. She made her West End theatre debut in 1944 at the Comedy Theatre as Effie in This Was a Woman. She went on to play Mabel Crumm in While the Sun Shines (1945), Hetty in Call Home the Heart (1947) and Lady Orreyd in a revival of The Second Mrs Tanqueray (1950). Fraser performed in plays in the 1960s and 70s by noted contemporary playwrights, such as the role of Flora in Harold Pinter's A Slight Ache, Delia in Alan Ayckbourn's Bedroom Farce, Martha in Edward Albee's Who's Afraid Of Virginia Woolf?, and Amanda Wingfield in The Glass Menagerie by Tennessee Williams.

In 1978 Fraser appeared as Mrs. Wilson, a respectable lady who becomes embroiled in a conspiracy to obtain the release of underworld crime boss Bill Hayden in the episode "When the Heat Cools Off" of the hard-hitting British police drama The Professionals.

In cinema, Fraser often played demure character roles in films such as the Master of Bankdam (1947) and Raising a Riot (1955), although she is also remembered for her roles as the vulgar Mrs Orreyd in the 1952 film The Second Mrs Tanqueray. In the 1970s she took one of her best-known roles as Jean Ashton, the embattled mother of a wartime family in Liverpool in the television serial A Family at War. In 1977 she played the part of Beru Lars, the aunt of Luke Skywalker, in the science fiction blockbuster Star Wars. In his casting notes, writer and director George Lucas wrote, "A little British, but okay". Fraser took part in location filming in Matmata, Tunisia, and her voice was later recorded at home for additional wild track lines and dialogue dubbing.

Fraser appeared in more than 50 films and TV shows during her career, including Z-Cars; Softly, Softly; A Family at War; The Professionals and Heartbeat on television, and such films as The Witches, Till Death Us Do Part, The Body Stealers, Doomwatch and Hope and Glory. She was a member of the BBC Repertory Company and appeared in over 500 BBC Radio plays.

In the 1950s, Fraser began to write for the theatre, and in the 1970s, she wrote two children's books, Captain Johnny and Princess Tai Lue. Building on her experience in radio, she also worked as a radio dramatist, and wrote her own radio play, The Maid's Room, about the relationship between a servant and her mistress. She also adapted Rose Macauley's novel The World My Wilderness and Rebecca West's short story "The Salt of the Earth" for BBC Radio 4.

== Personal life ==
Fraser was married and divorced from Anthony Squire. She was the sister of ballerina/actress Moyra Fraser. She died in 2000 following a long illness.

== Selected filmography ==
=== Film ===
| Year | Title | Role | Notes |
|---|---|---|---|
| 1944 | Welcome, Mr. Washington | Millie | |
| 1945 | I Live in Grosvenor Square | 2nd Girl in Guard's Van | |
| 1947 | Meet Me at Dawn | Minor Role | Uncredited |
| 1947 | Master of Bankdam | Alice France | |
| 1948 | Esther Waters | Margaret | |
| 1949 | The History of Mr. Polly | Minnie Larkins | |
| 1950 | Your Witness | Ellen Foster | |
| 1950 | Trio | Minor Role | Uncredited |
| 1952 | Salute the Toff | Myra Lorne | |
| 1952 | The Second Mrs Tanqueray | | |
| 1955 | Raising a Riot | Mary Kent | |
| 1956 | The Last Man to Hang? | Mrs Bracket | |
| 1958 | The Son of Robin Hood | Constance | |
| 1966 | The Witches | Mrs Creek | |
| 1968 | Till Death Us Do Part | Mike's Mother | |
| 1969 | The Body Stealers | Mrs Thatcher | |
| 1969 | A Touch of Love | Miss Gurnsey | |
| 1969 | Staircase | Cub Mistress | |
| 1969 | Two Gentlemen Sharing | Helen Marriott | |
| 1972 | Doomwatch | Mrs. Betty Straker | |
| 1973 | Nothing But the Night | Mrs Alison | |
| 1974 | Persecution | Mrs Banks | aka Sheba, The Graveyard, The Terror of Sheba |
| 1977 | Star Wars | Aunt Beru | |
| 1987 | Hope and Glory | WVS Woman | |

=== Television ===
| Year | Title | Role | Notes |
|---|---|---|---|
| 1960 | Emergency – Ward 10 | Brownie Bevan | 9 episodes |
| 1963 | Maigret | Claire Jusserand | Episode: Maigret's Little Joke |
| 1966 | Gideon's Way | Lady Copthorne | Episode: Morna |
| 1970–1971 | A Family at War | Jean Ashton | |
| 1971 | Doomwatch | Joan Prentice | Episode: The Islanders |
| 1976 | Beasts | Dorothy Pummery | Episode: Baby |
| 1978 | The Professionals | Elsa Coran; Mrs Wilson | Episode: A Stirring of Dust; Episode: When the Heat Cools Off |
| 2000 | Midsomer Murders | Jane Rochelle | Episode: Judgement Day |
| 2017 | Star Wars Rebels | Aunt Beru | Episode: Twin Suns, uncredited (archive audio) |
