= Flash in other media =

Adaptations of the Flash in other media
- Official logo
- Original source: Comics published by DC Comics
- First appearance: Flash Comics #1 (January 1940)

Print publications
- Novel(s): The Flash: Stop Motion (2004)

Films and television
- Film(s): Justice League: The New Frontier (2008); Justice League: Crisis on Two Earths (2010); Justice League: Doom (2012); Justice League: The Flashpoint Paradox (2013); The Lego Movie (2014); Batman v Superman: Dawn of Justice (2016); Suicide Squad (2016); Zack Snyder's Justice League (2021); The Flash (2023)
- Television show(s): The Superman/Aquaman Hour of Adventure (1967-1968); Aquaman (1967-1970); Super Friends (1973, 1977-1985); The Flash (1990-1991); Justice League (2001-2004); Justice League Unlimited (2004-2006); The Flash (2014–2023); Justice League Action (2016-2018); Stuart Fails to Save the Universe (2026)

Games
- Video game(s): The Flash (1993); Justice League Heroes: The Flash (2006); Lego Batman 2: DC Superheroes (2012); Lego Batman 3: Beyond Gotham (2014)

Throughout his 80-year history, the Flash has appeared in numerous media.

== Film ==
=== Proposed Flash and Justice League films ===
Warner Bros. hired comic book writer Jeph Loeb to write a screenplay in the late-1980s, but the outing never materialized. Development for a film adaptation was revived after the studio was impressed with David S. Goyer's script for Batman Begins, and he was offered the choice of a Flash or Green Lantern film adaptation. In December 2004, it was announced that Goyer would be writing, producing and directing The Flash. He approached his Blade: Trinity co-star Ryan Reynolds for the role of Wally West, with the intention of also using Barry Allen as a supporting character. Goyer's script, which he tonally compared to Sam Raimi's work on the first two movies of the Spider-Man trilogy, was influenced by seminal comic book runs by Mike Baron, Mark Waid, and Geoff Johns. By 2007, however, Goyer dropped out of the project, citing creative differences with the studio.

The same month Goyer revealed he was off The Flash, Warner Bros. hired husband and wife screenwriting duo Michelle and Kieran Mulroney to script a Justice League film featuring Barry Allen, and Shawn Levy to direct a spin-off featuring Wally West. Justice League attached George Miller as director. He cast Adam Brody as Barry Allen. Levy departed from The Flash due to his commitment to Night at the Museum: Battle of the Smithsonian and was replaced by David Dobkin. Filming was nearly set to begin for Justice League, but Brody's contract lapsed when the Australian Film Commission denied Warner Bros. a 45 percent tax credit. Warner Bros. hired Craig Wright to script The Flash and announced a 2008 release date following the collapse of Justice League. The project became delayed by the 2007–08 Writers Guild of America strike. Warner Bros. brought Batman producer Charles Roven aboard, with comic book writer Geoff Johns serving as a consult and co-writer. Johns created a new film treatment. Dan Mazeau was the screenwriter.

In September 2009, Warner Bros. Entertainment Inc. had launched a new division, DC Entertainment Inc., in order to better expand the DC brand. In October 2009, Charles Roven was asked about the future of the Flash. In the interview, Roven explained that he was involved but that he was removed from the project because The Flash was speeding in the direction Warner Bros. had in mind, leaving the possible film in uncertainty. The day after Dan Mazeau responded to the article by saying, "Just to chime in on your latest article: The Flash has not been hobbled. Everything is moving forward as planned… I'm still writing the script. Geoff Johns is still consulting. Flash fans have no cause for concern, and — IMO — lots to be excited about." In February 2010, it was reported that Warners was expected to announce its DC slate in the coming months populated by characters like The Flash and Wonder Woman."

=== DC Extended Universe (2016–2023) ===
In late February 2010, it was reported that the leading contender to helm The Flash was Greg Berlanti (who subsequently went on to introduce The Flash TV show). Warner Bros. Chairman and CEO Barry Meyer said they are getting close to giving the go-ahead for a movie. On June 9, 2010, Green Lantern writers Berlanti, Michael Green and Marc Guggenheim were hired to pen a treatment of the film. The Flash script would've been based on the recent run by DC's Chief Creative Officer Geoff Johns. Mazeau told Blastr.com that the studio are still actively developing the big screen take on the DC Comics' character and that the project is not dead yet. On July 20, 2013, The Hollywood Reporter has reported that the film was rumored to be released in 2016 but it has not been announced. In October 2014, Warner Bros. announced The Flash would be released in 2018 as the sixth installment of the DC Extended Universe. Ezra Miller was cast to play the title role of Barry Allen. However, the Flash project had been renamed 'Flashpoint' and was tentatively moved to a 2020 release date. The film was eventually released in 2023. Miller made a cameo appearance in the Arrowverse's "Crisis on Infinite Earths: Part Four".

==== Batman v Superman: Dawn of Justice (2016) ====
The Flash's first appearance in the DCEU happened in Batman v Superman: Dawn of Justice where the character made two small appearances. He first appears in a nightmare sequence showing up in the Batcave, wearing a futuristic armor version of his classic costume, in order to warn Bruce Wayne of an upcoming threat. Although the scene is left for interpretation, with Flash stating that Lois Lane is the key and that Bruce was right about "him" mixed in with a frustrated realization that he is "too soon", it indicates a possible post-apocalyptic future which the character is trying to prevent. He is later seen again, this time in the "real world" and in the present day when Wonder Woman is going through the recorded footage of several metahuman sightings. He appears in a liquor store's security camera footage, wearing his normal civilian clothes, stopping a burglar.

==== Suicide Squad (2016) ====
Miller reprised their role in Suicide Squad, in a flashback where he is shown easily apprehending George "Digger" Harkness / Captain Boomerang.

==== Justice League (2017) Snyder Cut (2021) ====
Miller reprises their role in 2017's Justice League and its 2021 directors cut entitled Zack Snyder's Justice League. Barry Allen/The Flash is reduced to being a minor player in the 2017 theatrical version of Justice League with the character (along with Cyborg played by Ray Fisher) although he does resurrect Superman by charging a Mother Box which had been placed next to Superman's body which was placed in fluid inside the Kryptonian ship (which had crashed during the events of Man of Steel). In the theatrical version The Flash is used as the comic relief for the film and is shown to be intimidated of going into battle. In the theatrical version Flash and Superman are sent to save civilians in Russia from Steppenwolf's forces. Flash manages to save one family in a pick truck before rejoining the other members of the Justice League at Steppenwolff's where he is easily knocked to ground by Steppenwolf before the other members of the Justice League manage to defeat the villain. In the 'Snyder Cut' of the film (released in 2021) the Flash whilst still eccentric is shown to be much more battle hardened than the theatrical version. This version also hints Barry's developing affection for Iris West whom he saves from a near fatal collision using his ability to reverse time. As in the theatrical version Barry helps charge to Mother Box to resurrect Superman but in this version Barry is forced to slightly reverse time due to having initially slightly mistimed his run so the electric current he is producing makes contact with Mother Box before the box makes contact with the fluid inside the Kryptonian ship. Unlike the original film, Barry turns back time to before the Mother Boxes were unified, giving the Justice League a second chance to defeat Steppenwolf - which is successful.

==== The Flash (2023) ====
A story treatment for the film would have been written by Phil Lord and Chris Miller. The studio was courting the duo to also direct, but they declined due to their busy schedule. The studio instead signed Seth Grahame-Smith to write and direct. In April 2016, he dropped out due to creative differences. The studio retained his script. Greg Berlanti, who co-created The CW's television series of the same name, was previously said to be writer and director. It was revealed by producer Charles Roven that the film and Aquaman would take place after the events of Justice League and thus would not be an origin story. In June 2016, it was revealed that Rick Famuyiwa would be taking the helm as a director for The Flash. Famuyiwa posted a photo on his Instagram page that he did research on the character. In July 2016, Kiersey Clemons was announced as being cast in the role of Iris West. In August, Ray Fisher was announced to reprise his role as Victor Stone / Cyborg. However director Famuyiwa denied Cyborg's involvement in the film. Filming was scheduled to start in January 2017 in London, England. On September 9, 2016, Variety reported that Billy Crudup was in talks for the role of Henry Allen. On October 31, 2016, The Hollywood Reporter reported that Famuyiwa had left the film over creative differences. In an interview with IGN, Miller explained that their character would be an amateur superhero speedster. On January 25, 2017, Variety reported that Joby Harold would rewrite the script for the film. On April 27, 2017, Screen Junkies reported that Robert Zemeckis was in talks to direct the film. In May, the studio had Robert Zemeckis, Matthew Vaughn, and Sam Raimi on a shortlist of possible directors for the film. Later that month, Raimi and Marc Webb had dropped out from the running. In June 2017, The Wrap reported that Lord and Miller were in talks to direct the film again. In September 2017, Deadline reported that Gal Gadot would reprise her role as Diana Prince / Wonder Woman in the film. In February 2018, it was announced that filmmaking duo John Francis Daley and Jonathan Goldstein had signed on to direct the film. By July, Daley and Goldstein were announced to have left the project. Shortly after, Andy Muschietti and Christina Hodson entered negotiations to direct and write a new draft of the script, respectively. On August 29, 2019, Muschietti confirmed to Fandango that he would direct the film. Principal photography took place in Atlanta, Georgia and Leavesden, Hertfordshire, England. In October 2018, The Flash was scheduled to release sometime in 2021, if not then in 2022, and later was pushed to June 23, 2023. On December 11, 2019, Warner Bros. dated The Flash starring Ezra Miller to release on July 1, 2022, with Andy Muschietti directing. In January 2020, Muschietti stated that elements of the Flashpoint storyline would be incorporated into the film. On April 20, 2020, the film was moved up to June 3, 2022, due to the ongoing COVID-19 pandemic. Then, in June 2020, TheWrap reported that Michael Keaton was in early negotiations to reprise his role of Bruce Wayne / Batman for the film. In August 2020, it was confirmed that Keaton had signed on to return and that Ben Affleck would reprise his role as his incarnation of Batman in the DCEU for the film as well. It marked Affleck's final performance of Batman. On October 5, 2020, the film was delayed to November 4, 2022. That same month, Crudup entered negotiations to reprise the role of Henry Allen, with him being confirmed by February 2021. In January 2021, Cyborg was written out of the movie, due to Ray Fisher refusing to work on any project with DC Films president, Walter Hamada. In February 2021, Sasha Calle was cast as Supergirl, making her the first Latina actress as the character. In March 2021, Clemons was confirmed to have signed back onto to the project as Iris West. Later that month, Maribel Verdú had been cast as Nora Allen, Barry's mother, and Crudup was forced to depart from the project to scheduling conflicts with The Morning Show, with the role being recast with Ron Livingston. Filming began on April 19, 2021, at Warner Bros. Studios, Leavesden, and wrapped on October 18, 2021. It was also confirmed that Benjamin Wallfisch would compose the score to the film. In December 2021, Michael Shannon and Antje Traue were revealed to be reprising their roles from Man of Steel (2013) as General Zod and Faora-Ul, respectively. Former co-directors of the film, John Francis Daley and Jonathan Goldstein, were also confirmed to be receiving story credit for the film alongside Hodson. Despite numerous recent controversies regarding Ezra Miller's alleged abusive behavior up until August 2022, Warner Bros. decided to continue with the film's production, considering it reached the post-production stage and Miller's presence in nearly every frame of the film.

=== Animated ===
- Barry Allen / Flash appears in Justice League: The New Frontier, voiced by Neil Patrick Harris. Jay Garrick and Wally West also make brief appearances during the opening and closing credits of the movie.
- Wally West / Flash appears in Justice League: Crisis on Two Earths, voiced by Josh Keaton. In the film, Flash and the rest of the Justice League assists an alternate Lex Luthor battle the Crime Syndicate of America and restore order to the alternate world. Flash eventually battles his double, Johnny Quick.
- Barry Allen / Flash appears in DC Super Friends: The Joker's Playhouse, voiced by Eric Bauza.
- Barry Allen / The Flash appears in Justice League: Doom, voiced by Michael Rosenbaum. In the film, Mirror Master is chosen by Vandal Savage to fight Flash. Mirror Master then tricks Flash into sticking his hand in a "hostage box" to save an old woman. Only the woman is a hologram and Flash ends up with a speed sensitive bomb on his wrist. Batman eventually has him vibrate through an iceberg to save him, and he goes on with the rest of the JLA to fight the Legion of Doom.
- Barry Allen / Flash appears in Lego Batman: The Movie - DC Super Heroes Unite, an adaptation of the video game of the same name, with Charlie Schlatter reprising his role.
- Barry Allen / Flash appears in films set in DC Animated Movie Universe, voiced initially by Justin Chambers and subsequently by Christopher Gorham.
- Barry Allen / Flash appears in JLA Adventures: Trapped in Time, voiced by Jason Spisak.
- Barry Allen / Flash appears in The Lego Movie as a member of Metalbeard's crew, trying to infiltrate the Octan Tower.
- Barry Allen / Flash appears in Batman Unlimited: Animal Instincts, voiced by Charlie Schlatter.
- Barry Allen / Flash appears in Lego DC Comics Super Heroes: Justice League vs. Bizarro League, with James Arnold Taylor reprising the role.
- Barry Allen / Flash appears in Lego DC Comics Super Heroes: Justice League: Attack of the Legion of Doom, with James Arnold Taylor reprising the role.
- Barry Allen appears in Lego DC Comics Super Heroes: Justice League: Cosmic Clash, with James Arnold Taylor reprising the role.
- Barry Allen / Flash appears in The Lego Batman Movie, voiced by Adam DeVine.
- Barry Allen / Flash appears in DC Super Heroes vs. Eagle Talon, voiced by Daisuke Namikawa.
- Barry Allen / Flash appears in Lego DC Comics Super Heroes: The Flash, with James Arnold Taylor reprising the role.
- Barry Allen / Flash appears in Teen Titans Go! To the Movies, voiced by Wil Wheaton.
- Barry Allen / Flash appears in films set in the Tomorrowverse, voiced by Matt Bomer.
- The DC Animated Universe version of Wally West / Flash makes a cameo appearance in Space Jam: A New Legacy.
- Barry Allen / Flash appears in the animated film adaptation of the Injustice video game series, voiced by Yuri Lowenthal. Unlike the video games and comics, Barry plays a small role, and is killed in a trap set by the Joker before the destruction of Metropolis.
- Barry Allen / Flash appears in Teen Titans Go! & DC Super Hero Girls: Mayhem in the Multiverse, with Phil LaMarr reprising his voice role from the series.
- Barry Allen / Flash appears in DC League of Super-Pets, voiced by John Early.
- Wally West / Kid Flash makes a cameo appearance in Batman and Superman: Battle of the Super Sons.
- Barry Allen / Flash appears in Justice League x RWBY: Super Heroes & Huntsmen, voiced by David Errigo Jr. in Part One and David Dastmalchian in Part Two.

== Television ==
=== Animated ===
==== The Superman/Aquaman Hour of Adventure ====
The Flash and Kid Flash on The Superman/Aquaman Hour of Adventure

In 1967, The Superman/Aquaman Hour of Adventure was produced by Filmation and featured eighteen, seven-minute shorts which starred various DC Universe heroes, including three solo adventures of Barry Allen (voiced by Cliff Owens). Kid Flash also appears in the series, voiced by Tommy Cook.

==== Filmation's The Flash animated series ====
Animation studio Filmation considered to make The Flash animated series following the success of The Superman/Aquaman Hour of Adventure, but nothing came out of it.

==== Super Friends ====
Barry Allen / Flash appears in Super Friends, voiced by Jack Angel.

==== DC Animated Universe ====
The Flash, as he appeared in Justice League and Justice League Unlimited.

The Wally West incarnation of Flash appears in series set in the DC Animated Universe (DCAU), voiced initially by Charlie Schlatter in Superman: The Animated Series and by Michael Rosenbaum in subsequent series.

==== The Batman ====
The Barry Allen incarnation of Flash appears in The Batman, voiced by Charlie Schlatter.

==== Teen Titans animated series ====
Kid Flash as he appears in Teen Titans.

The Wally West incarnation of Kid Flash appears in Teen Titans, voiced by Michael Rosenbaum.

==== Batman: The Brave and the Bold ====
The Barry Allen and Jay Garrick incarnations of Flash, and the Wally West incarnation of Kid Flash appear in Batman: The Brave and the Bold, respectively voiced by Alan Tudyk, Andy Milder, and Hunter Parrish.

==== Young Justice ====
The Barry Allen and Jay Garrick incarnations of Flash, and the Wally West and Bart Allen incarnations of Kid Flash appear in Young Justice. Wally is voiced by Jason Spisak, Jay is voiced by Geoff Pierson, Bart is voiced by Jason Marsden, and Barry is voiced by George Eads in the first two seasons and by James Arnold Taylor in later seasons.

==== Mad ====
The Flashes (Jay Garrick, Barry Allen, and Wally West with Bart Allen as Kid Flash) appear in the Mad segment "That's What Super Friends Are For", where they try to appeal to Superman, Batman, and Wonder Woman about being called "Super Friends."

==== Teen Titans Go! ====
The Wally West incarnation of Kid Flash appears in Teen Titans Go!, voiced by Will Friedle. In contrast to their relationship in the comics, Robin and Kid Flash have a fierce rivalry in this show. The Barry Allen incarnation of Flash appears in the two-part episode "Teen Titans Action", voiced by P. J. Byrne.

==== Vixen ====
The Arrowverse incarnation of Barry Allen appears in Vixen, voiced by Grant Gustin.

==== DC Super Hero Girls ====
The Barry Allen incarnation of Flash appears in the web series DC Super Hero Girls, voiced by Josh Keaton. Barry also appears in the television series DC Super Hero Girls, voiced by Phil LaMarr.

==== Justice League Action ====
The Barry Allen incarnation of Flash appears in Justice League Action, with Charlie Schlatter reprising his role.

==== Scooby-Doo & Guess Who? ====
The Barry Allen incarnation of Flash appears in Scooby-Doo and Guess Who? episode "One Minute Mysteries", voiced again by Charlie Schlatter.

==== Harley Quinn ====
The Barry Allen incarnation of Flash appears in Harley Quinn, voiced by Scott Porter in the second season and Zeno Robinson in the fourth.

=== Live-action ===
The Barry Allen incarnation of Flash appears in Legends of the Superheroes, portrayed by Rod Haase.

==== Unlimited Powers ====
Unlimited Powers was a cancelled TV pilot for CBS written by Danny Bilson and Paul De Meo, the writers of the eventual 90s Flash series. In a story possibly inspired by Watchmen, the plot would have revolved around Barry Allen escaping a fifteen-year prison sentence suspended in animation. He would find that in the future, superpowers are outlawed on Earth. Every superhero has fallen from grace (Wonder Woman working at a fast-food joint, Dr. Occult working as a psychic, Hal Jordan living on the streets, etc.), including his once-sidekick Wally West (now a middle-aged businessman). Barry finds his powers fatigued when he uses them, his age is catching up with him, and he is now a wanted man. Running the government would be Joar Mahkent (secretly himself a super-powered being), and his companion, Selina Kyle, who are unfazed by the Flash's return. Barry suspects that villains are running the world politically, and teams up with Oliver Queen's teenage daughter to recruit the now retired heroes in an attempt to stop Mahkent once and for all.

==== The Flash (1990–1991) ====
John Wesley Shipp as the titular protagonist of the television series The Flash.

The Flash was a live action television series on CBS that starred John Wesley Shipp and Amanda Pays. The Flash featured in the series was an amalgamation of the Silver Age Flash, Barry Allen, and the modern-age Wally West. The only resemblance between the TV Barry Allen Flash and the comic book Barry Allen Flash was his name, his profession as a forensic scientist, and his love interest Iris West played by Paula Marshall (who was very short-lived as a love interest in the television series). In this version, while working as a police detective, Barry was working in the crime lab at the Central City Police Department headquarters one night when a lightning bolt struck his lab, dousing him in electricity and nearby chemicals, which soon gave him the ability to run at superhuman speeds, just like in the comics.

The series also featured an older brother for Barry named Jay Allen (named after Jay Garrick, the original Flash) who was also a police officer and a motorcycle cop. Jay was killed in the line of duty by a criminal gang leader named Nicholas Pike. After that, Barry donned a special red prototype deep-sea diving suit from Russia designed to withstand friction and pressure, and called himself the Flash. By using his new costume and powers, Barry captured Pike and brought him to justice. From then on, Barry used his identity as Flash to help bring down other criminals in Central City. He became a hero full-time.

Most of the elements in the television show were taken directly from the main story line in the first Wally West Flash comic books: The S.T.A.R. Labs researcher Tina McGee, she and her husband's research into speed, her husband's allegedly fatal accident with their speed research, the Flash's ravenous appetite, heat problems (which were mitigated by the TV show's Flash suit), and speed limit on the order of the speed of sound were all elements from the main Wally West comic book storyline.

The Flash's most famous villain in the series was the Trickster, played by Mark Hamill, who later went on to voice the Joker in Batman: The Animated Series and, later, the Trickster in Justice League Unlimited. Captain Cold, played by Michael Champion, and Mirror Master, played by David Cassidy, also appeared in their own episodes. The complete series was released as a DVD set by Warner Bros. in 2006.

The Flash TV Special #1 comic introduced a variation on Kid Flash. This particular version of the character was a teenage thief named Vince Everett. Unlike the Flash, his powers did not require eating to replenish. His speed is pushed to the limit as he chases the Flash through an amusement park, eventually burning out his powers.

Shipp later returned to the Flash franchise twenty years after the series' cancellation; first in an episode of Batman: The Brave and the Bold, titled "Requiem for a Scarlet Speedster!" voicing Professor Zoom, and later in recurring roles as Barry's father Henry Allen and Henry's parallel universe counterpart Jay Garrick in The CW's The Flash.

An image of Shipp's Flash appears on an episode of The Flash (2014), as Earth-2 Harrison Wells, Cisco Ramon and Barry travel through the Arrowverse multiverse to get to Earth-2. This makes this series a part of the Arrowverse as a different universe.

==== Justice League of America pilot (1997) ====
The Barry Allen incarnation of Flash appears in Justice League of America, portrayed by Kenny Johnston.

==== Smallville ====
Bart Allen/Impulse portrayed by Kyle Gallner in the Smallville episode "Justice"

Bart Allen made guest appearances in the television series Smallville, in the fourth-season episode "Run" (first aired October 20, 2004), and in the sixth season in the episode "Justice" (first aired on January 18, 2007). He is played by Kyle Gallner. He is portrayed as a self-centered teenager who uses his powers for personal gain. He goes by the name Bart Allen, but he is shown to be carrying multiple ID cards also identifying him as "Jay Garrick", "Barry Allen", and "Wally West". His speed is depicted as being well in excess of that of Clark. Not only is he able to run backward and match Clark's top speed, but is able to run fast enough that Clark, even moving at top speed, cannot follow his movements.

Their mutual respect made it apparent that they had become friends towards the end (as Superman and Flash are good friends in the future), with allusions being made to forming a "league" one day. It is mentioned that he got his powers through an accident, rather than genetics as in the comics, although at least one of the Flashes has gotten his powers through an accident. This incarnation of the Flash is also one of the few superpowered characters on Smallville who is not a "Meteor Freak", meaning they have not acquired their powers through Kryptonite-related means via one of Smallville's infamous meteor showers.

Although commercials for "Run" billed him as "the Flash", he is never called by this name in the episode. Instead, in "Justice", he has been given the codename "Impulse". Like in the comics, Bart did not pick this name himself. In his second appearance with Green Arrow/Oliver Queen's Team, Bart has matured somewhat, but he maintained roughly the same personality. However, he is now using his powers to help others along with Aquaman, Green Arrow, Cyborg and later, Black Canary, this group works to stop one of Lex Luthor's evil side projects, 33.1.

Kyle Gallner reprises his role as Impulse for a final time in the season eight finale, "Doomsday". The character's presence continues to be felt thereafter, though he does not directly feature. For example, in the ninth-season episode "Absolute Justice", the Golden Age Flash, Jay Garrick, is seen in flashbacks, getting arrested with the other Justice Society members. Impulse appeared in two additional episodes; a still frame of Kyle Gallner from earlier seasons was used to give the appearance that Bart was attending a Justice League meeting via videoscreen in the season 9 finale, "Salvation". The character is also present in the season 10 episode "Icarus" at the funeral of Carter Hall, but his face is not shown. In the series' penultimate episode, villains are assembled and are each given a hero to kill. Bart is given to Captain Cold. The character later features prominently in the comic book continuation to the TV series with Bart meeting Garrick and facing the Black Flash resulting in his death, thrusting Jay back in the role as mentor to younger heroes called "Titans". At one point, there was a consideration for Smallville spin-off starring Bart Allen, but it never came to fruition.

==== The Flash (unproduced The WB series) ====
In 2003, Warner Bros. was planning a Flash TV series with Todd Komarnicki signed on to write and executive produce it. Inspired by the 1960s science fiction drama The Time Tunnel, the series would have been a loose adaptation of the Flash, depicting him as a fresh-out-of-college Gotham City resident who uses his powers to travel backwards and forwards in time, going on missions. As with Smallville, the series would have eschewed superhero costumes altogether. According to writer Steven S. DeKnight, who was the writer for Smallville, there were creative differences over how a Flash television series should be handled, given the previous attempt at translating the character to the small screen in 1990, and that the studio wanted to create a Flash who was a "time-traveling college student from Gotham City". As a result, the series never materialized, and the character was ultimately brought to Smallville.

==== Arrowverse ====
Grant Gustin as the titular protagonist in the television series The Flash, a spin-off of Arrow.

On July 30, 2013, it was announced that Arrow co-creators Greg Berlanti and Andrew Kreisberg, and Arrow pilot director David Nutter and Geoff Johns, would develop a Flash TV series for The CW. The series would be the origin story of Barry Allen. Kreisberg revealed after the announcement, that Allen would be a recurring character on Arrow in three episodes of season 2, all written by Berlanti, Kreisberg and Johns, and that the last of the episodes would act as a backdoor pilot. On September 13, 2013, Grant Gustin was chosen to portray Allen.

In November 2013, it was announced that the third appearance of Allen on Arrow would no longer be a backdoor pilot, with the studio opting to make a traditional pilot instead. By doing so, it allowed the creative team to flesh out the Flash's story and his world on a bigger budget, instead of being constrained to incorporating Arrow characters within a backdoor pilot. The decision was made after CW executives saw material from Barry Allen's first two episodes on Arrow, which were very well received. The pilot was written by Berlanti, Kreisberg and Johns, directed by Nutter, and executive produced by Berlanti, Kreisberg, Nutter and Melissa Kellner Berman. The show would still be tied to Arrow, since that is where Barry Allen made his first appearance. On January 29, 2014, The Flash was officially ordered for a pilot episode.

Both Jay Garrick and Wally West later appear in season 2, with John Wesley Shipp as Garrick, from Earth-3. and Keiynan Lonsdale as Wally. Shipp later reprises his role as Barry Allen / The Flash from the 1990 television series in the crossover "Elseworlds," retroactively establishing this iteration of the superhero as an Earth-90 counterpart of Jay Garrick and Earth-1 Barry's father Henry Allen. Ezra Miller reprised their role as the DCEU version of Barry Allen in the "Crisis on Infinite Earths" Arrowverse crossover.

==== Supergirl ====
On February 3, 2016, it was announced that Gustin would appear on the Supergirl episode "Worlds Finest", due to Supergirl existing in the Arrowverse multiverse. In the episode, Barry travels to Supergirl's Earth by accident, allying with her to find a way back to his Earth and defeat the new 'alliance' of supervillains Livewire and Silver Banshee.

=== Stargirl ===
Stargirl features Jay Garrick as one of the original members of the Justice Society of America. He is played by an uncredited actor in season 1, and by John Wesley Shipp in season 2 onward. He dies offscreen in the series pilot in a battle with the Injustice Society, ice on his discarded helmet suggests Icicle murdered him. His helmet and a banner of his profile are stored at the Justice Society of America's headquarters long after his death.

Flashbacks in season 2 show Jay attending the funeral of Doctor Mid-Nite's daughter after she was killed by Eclipso. Once the JSA learn that to defeat Eclipso involves killing his host, several members vote whether to take this action. Jay votes against the motion, not content with taking a life. This action is implied to be the reason the JSA lost to the Injustice Society years later.

In the finale of season 3, Jay is revealed to be alive and appears out of a portal, destroying the team meeting table to talk with Shade. He instructs the Shade to gather the new generation of the JSA together to go on another adventure.

=== DC Extended Universe ===
==== Peacemaker ====
Miller makes an uncredited cameo as the Flash in the season 1 finale of the DCEU series Peacemaker, where he and other members of the Justice League arrive to help stop the Butterfly alien threat, only to discover the threat was already dealt with, after which Flash teases Aquaman with an online rumor regarding him.

== Video games ==
- The Flash is a Game Boy game based on the live action television series and was released in 1991.
- The Flash was set to have a video game on the Nintendo Entertainment System (NES), but it was never released.
- The Flash was a video game that was released on the Master System in 1993.
- Wally West is a playable fighter in Justice League Task Force released on the Super NES and Sega Genesis in 1995.
- Wally West is a featured playable character in the video game, Justice League Heroes. In addition, there is a spinoff game for Game Boy Advance with the Flash as the main hero titled Justice League Heroes: The Flash. Both were released in 2006. Here he is voiced by Chris Edgerly.
- Barry Allen is a playable fighter in Mortal Kombat vs. DC Universe, a crossover fighting game produced by Midway Games. His counterpart from the Mortal Kombat Universe is the undead ninja Scorpion, and in both stories, one teleports in the place of the other because of the merging between their two universes. Both are defeated by Batman and Liu Kang, who described him as the "red devil with a lightning bolt on his chest". He is voiced by Taliesin Jaffe.
- Jay Garrick, Barry Allen, and Wally West appear as the Flash in DC Universe Online. Bart Allen is also in the game as Kid Flash.
- Barry Allen appears in Lego Batman 2: DC Super Heroes, with Charlie Schlatter reprising his role.
- Barry Allen is a playable fighter in Injustice: Gods Among Us, voiced by Neal McDonough. The New 52 Earth 2 version of Jay Garrick also appears as a downloadable alternate skin.
- Wally West appears as a playable character in the video game Young Justice: Legacy. Jason Spisak voices the character.
- Barry Allen appears as a playable character in Lego Batman 3: Beyond Gotham, where Charlie Schlatter reprises his role. Wally West is also playable as Kid Flash, voiced by Sam Riegel.
- Barry Allen appears as a playable character in the multiplayer battle arena game Infinite Crisis, voiced again by Michael Rosenbaum.
- The Flash makes an appearance in Lego Dimensions as a sidequest character in the DC Comics Adventure World and The Lego Batman Movie Adventure World, again, voiced by Charlie Schlatter. In the DC Comics World, he recruits the player to help him defeat goons in the merged Metropolis and Gotham area. In The Lego Batman Movie World, he requests the players help in fending off enemies while he delivers ice cream. The CW version also makes a cameo in a secret location based on S.T.A.R. Labs from the show that can only be found in the Fantastic Beasts and Where to Find Them World.
- In Batman: Arkham Knight, Central City is mentioned as well as several posters appearing with a red blur on them, presumably the Flash. Some of Arkham Knight's militia mention a superhero in Central City who is heavily implied to be the Flash.
- Barry Allen returns as a playable fighter in Injustice 2, with Taliesin Jaffe reprising the role. Jay Garrick is also featured as an alternate skin. In Flash's ending, Jay, Wally West, Wally West II, and Jesse Quick all make cameo appearances.
- Barry Allen appears in Lego DC Super-Villains, voiced again by Michael Rosenbaum. The Barry Allen from The Flash TV series also appears as a playable character in the DC TV Super-Heroes DLC pack, as well as the DCEU Flash and Wally West (in Young Justice DLC, Rebirth and New 52 Wallace).
- The Flash appears in The Lego Movie 2 Videogame as an NPC who is offering race sidequests.
- Barry Allen appeared as one of the antagonists in Suicide Squad: Kill the Justice League, with Scott Porter reprising the role from the Harley Quinn TV series.

== Fine arts ==
In the fine arts, and starting with the Pop Art period and on a continuing basis since the 1960s, the character of the Flash has been "appropriated" by multiple visual artists and incorporated into contemporary artwork, most notably by Andy Warhol, Roy Lichtenstein, Mel Ramos, Dulce Pinzon, and others.

== Other appearances ==
- Wally West was the protagonist in the novel The Flash: Stop Motion, written by Mark Schultz.
- The Flash appeared as a character in the tabletop miniature game DC HeroClix.
- The Flash appeared as a playable character in the dice game DC Comics Dice Masters.
- The Flash appeared as a character option in various DC Comics Deck-Building Game Expansion sets.
- Barry Allen and Eobard Thawne are playable characters in DC Comics Deck-Building Game: Rivals — The Flash vs. Reverse-Flash.
- The Flash will appear as a playable hero in the upcoming DC Super Heroes United cooperative board game by CMON.
- The Flash (Barry Allen) appears as a playable hero deck in Legendary: A DC Deck-Building Game by UpperDeck.
- The Flash will appear as a playable hero in the upcoming cooperative board game DCeased - A Zombicide game by CMON.

== In popular culture ==
- In The Simpsons episode "New Kids on the Blecch" (2001), Comic Book Guy dresses up like the Flash and says, "No one can outrun The Flash" until he falls and gets stuck in a manhole. In the earlier episode "Marge vs. the Monorail" (1993), Lyle Lanley is addressing a class of children and is asked whether his monorail can outrun the Flash. After replying in the affirmative, he is asked if Superman can outrun the Flash, to which he replies "Sure, whatever...".
- In Catch Me If You Can (2002), Frank Abagnale is shown with a stack of Flash comics in his room. He later uses the alias "Barry Allen" to elude Carl Hanratty. At the end of the film, Hanratty visits Abagnale in prison and gives him some Flash comics as a present.
- In Daddy Day Care (2003), Jimmy Bennett plays Tony, a boy who thinks he is the Flash and refuses to take off his costume. A sugar rush actually affords him super speed for a while. He is eventually convinced to stop being the Flash after a conversation with Marvin (Steve Zahn), where Tony sees that he knows nothing else about the Flash.
- The band Jim's Big Ego has a song entitled "The Ballad of Barry Allen", about the Flash. Jim Infantino, the lead singer of the band, is the nephew of Flash co-creator Carmine Infantino.
- In the first season of Lost, Walt Lloyd is seen reading the Spanish version of a Flash comic Green Lantern/Flash: Faster Friends #1 on several occasions. In the third season episode "Catch-22", Charlie Pace and Hurley Reyes are seen debating the question of whether the Flash could defeat Superman in a footrace.
- During WrestleMania XX, Rey Mysterio wore a Flash-like costume.
- In The Adventures of Jimmy Neutron, Boy Genius episode "N-Men" (2004), Sheen Estevez gains Flash-like powers and goes by the name Vibrating Lad.
- An unidentified Flash appears in the South Park episode "Imaginationland" (2007).
- An unidentified Flash appears in Robot Chicken, voiced by Nathan Fillion in "Losin' the Wobble" and Matthew Senreich in all other appearances.
- In The Big Bang Theory episode "The Middle-Earth Paradigm" (2007), the four main characters dress as the Flash when they are invited to go to a Halloween party but change as they did not want to go in the same costume. The character of Sheldon Cooper is also frequently seen wearing a Flash T-shirt. Similarly in the episode "The Work Song Nanocluster" (2009), Sheldon is shown dressed as the Flash and imitating his powers, after drinking coffee. In the episode "The Justice League Recombination" (2010), Sheldon again wears a Flash costume for a New Year's Eve party, though this time the others appear as different DC characters: Leonard Hofstadter as Green Lantern, Howard Wolowitz as Batman, Raj Koothrappali as Aquaman, Penny as Wonder Woman, and Penny's boyfriend Zack as Superman. In "The Dependence Transcendence" (2016), a sleep-deprived Sheldon has a dream where the Flash (portrayed by Brandon Jones) persuades him that energy drinks are beneficial.
- At Six Flags theme parks, which frequently use DC superheroes around the park, visitors can spend additional money to buy "The Flash Pass" which allows them to speed through lines to certain attractions. Promotions for the pass frequently feature the Flash himself.
- The Flash appears in the web series Death Battle, where he battles Marvel Comics speedster Quicksilver.
- Jay Garrick (played by Andy Ridings) appears in the series Stuart Fails to Save the Universe, showing up in Episode 9, "Spoiler: We Couldn't Get Green Lantern". In the episode, Stuart and the gang travel from Gotham City to recruit Golden Age Flash, who helps them navigate and escape the comic book world they're trapped in.

== Recurring cast and characters ==
Character	The Flash (1990 TV series)	Superman: The Animated Series Justice League Justice League Unlimited	Smallville	Batman: The Brave and the Bold	The Flash (2014 TV series) Arrow (TV series) Supergirl (TV series) Batwoman (TV series) Legends of Tomorrow	Batman V Superman Suicide Squad Justice League The Suicide Squad The Flash	Justice League Action	Stargirl
Barry Allen The Flash	John Wesley Shipp			Alan Tudyk	Grant Gustin Ezra Miller	Ezra Miller	Charlie Schlatter	
Jay Garrick The Flash (Earth-2)				Andy Milder^{V}	John Wesley Shipp			John Wesley Shipp
Wally West Kid Flash The Flash		Charlie Schlatter^{V} Michael Rosenbaum^{V} Clancy Brown^{V}		Hunter Parrish^{V}	Keiynan Lonsdale			
Iris West	Paula Marshall				Candice Patton	Kiersey Clemons		
Digger Harkness Captain Boomerang				John DiMaggio^{V}	Nick E. Tarabay	Jai Courtney		
Sam Scudder Mirror Master				Tom Kenny^{V}	Grey Damon			
Professor Zoom				John Wesley Shipp^{V}	Teddy Sears	Jason Ballantine		
Bart Allen Impulse			Kyle Gallner		Jordan Fisher			
Henry Allen	M. Emmet Walsh				John Wesley Shipp	Ron Livingston		
Nora Allen	Priscilla Pointer				Michelle Harrison	Maribel Verdú		
Christina "Tina" McGee	Amanda Pays				Amanda Pays			
Trickster	Mark Hamill	Mark Hamill^{V}			Mark Hamill		Mark Hamill^{V}	
Leonard Snart Captain Cold		Lex Lang^{V}		Steven Blum	Wentworth Miller			
