= The Flash (video game) =

- Developer(s): Probe Software; Equilibrium (Game Boy)
- Publisher(s): Sega (Master System); THQ (Game Boy)
- Composer(s): Jeroen Tel (Master System); Amy Bamberger (Game Boy)
- Platform(s): Master System, Game Boy
- Release: EU: August 1993; US: 1991 (Game Boy)
- Genre(s): Action
- Mode(s): Single-player

The Flash is a 1993 action video game based on The Flash TV series on CBS. It was developed and published by Probe Software and Sega respectively for the Master System.

== Gameplay ==
The game is played from the typical platform style of the scrolling side on 2D, 3rd person viewpoint. The player controls Flash though the levels in which they must achieve two primary goals: find the switch which opens the level exit, then make it to the exit within the time limit.

There is also a secondary goal of collecting the gems that were stolen which increases the players score. If the player fails to make it to the exit within the time limit, the FED tracks Flash down and kills him upon contact.

The levels in the game are given the title "Episode". Each Episode is split into two zones. At the beginning of zone 1, Tina McGee will report to Flash on the whereabouts and activities of the Trickster giving the player an intro to the Episode and to help advance the storyline. At the end of the second zone in each Episode, Flash must face Trickster in his Trickstermobile. While the boss in the "boss stage" remains the same throughout the game, the Trickstermobile increases in difficulty with additional weapons and speed as the game progresses.

== Unrelated Game Boy version ==
A different Flash game was released for Game Boy in 1991 by THQ. The Game Boy version was also based on The Flash TV series, and had a password system. Unlike the Master System release, it was released in the United States.

== Reception ==
Reception

Review score
Publication	Score	
Publication	Game Boy	Master System
Sega Master Force	N/A	90%

Critical reception to The Flash was mixed. Some found the fast pace of the game too difficult to control while others appreciated the depth in graphics, level design, and the soundtrack. However, by 1993, the Master System was no longer supported in the Japanese and United States markets. Thus, the game's existence in the world's two biggest video game countries went relatively unnoticed and remains an obscure European release to this day. It is highly valued by some retro game collectors for this very reason.
