= Legendary: A Marvel Deck Building Game =

Board game

Legendary: A Marvel Deck Building Game (a.k.a. Marvel Legendary) is a cooperative deck-building game for 1-5 players, released in 2012. It was designed by Devin Low and published by Upper Deck Entertainment, a division of Upper Deck Company.

The game was a 2013 Origins Awards Best Traditional Card Game nominee and a 2013 Golden Geek Best Card Game nominee.

== Gameplay ==
Marvel Legendary is a cooperative, dedicated, deck-building card game featuring characters and scenarios from the Marvel Comics. Prior to starting the game, a Scheme is selected, detailing the specific plan of the villainous Mastermind and their henchmen. Two primary decks of cards are used: one with available heroes in the Headquarters (HQ), and one with villains invading the City. Specific parameters are determined by the specific Scheme, as well as the choice of Mastermind. Generally, the Hero Deck contains cards representing five to six different heroes, while the Villain Deck contains cards representing two or more villain groups and one henchman group, along with captured bystanders to rescue, Scheme Twists which advance the plot of the Scheme, and Master Strikes where the Mastermind attacks the HQ.

At the start of the game, players have a deck consisting only of eight S.H.I.E.L.D. Agents and 4 S.H.I.E.L.D. Troopers, representing one coin and one attack respectively. A player's hand contains six cards. Generally, players work throughout the game to use their coins to draft hero cards, and use their attack points to clear villains out of the city. Hero cards represent various Marvel superheroes, with the base game including fifteen heroes mainly from the Avengers and X-Men teams. A given Hero has four types of cards (2 common, 1 uncommon, 1 rare) with unique abilities, totaling fourteen cards per Hero. Five heroes are available in the Hero Deck during a given game unless otherwise specified by the Scheme (or in a six-player game, in which six heroes are used).

Hero Cards provide more powerful values of coins and attack, meaning that a player's deck generally gets stronger as the game progresses. Players work to keep villains from escaping the City, and to prevent the Mastermind from accomplishing their Scheme. Villains and Masterminds have a defined number of victory points, so there is a competitive element among players though the game is cooperative by nature. Bystanders are also worth one victory point when they are rescued. Players can sometimes take Wounds, which essentially clog up their deck as a useless card. All Wounds in a player's hand can be cleared if the player does not attack on their turn.

The game progresses until either the players defeat the final Mastermind Tactic, or the villains accomplish their Scheme. Schemes vary greatly: some are simply time bombs as Scheme Twists are revealed from the Villain Deck, while others might encourage a specific number of villains to escape the city, or a number of heroes to be KO'd from the HQ.

Expansions to the game increase the complexity of both the Hero and Villain abilities. The Guardians of the Galaxy expansion introduces Infinity Shards as an additional resources that can be used to boost the attack of whoever collects them, whether it be the player, villains in the City, or the Mastermind. The Villains stand-alone set flips the game to where you play as the villains fighting against heroic groups and their Commander, with a new board to reflect the subtle changes (such as from S.H.I.E.L.D. agents to H.Y.D.R.A. agents). The game is played exactly the same, and as such, the Villain Cards are fully compatible to play alongside the Hero Cards from the original game, and vice versa.

== List of expansions ==
Marvel Legendary has four stand-alone base sets that can be played independently, as well as over 30 expansion packs that require at least one of the stand-alone sets to play. Expansion packs range from small boxes with five new Heroes plus a few Villain groups and corresponding Masterminds, to big boxes with much more variety of both Heroes and Villains.

Most of the stand-alone sets and expansions feature original comic-style artwork. Marvel Studios Phase 1, Spider-Man Homecoming, Marvel Studios Guardians of the Galaxy, Marvel Studios The Infinity Saga, What If...? and Ant-Man and the Wasp feature stills from their respective projects within the Marvel Cinematic Universe.

In 2015, packs of Marvel 3D trading cards contained playable cards for Legendary. All but one card, a Stan Lee Bystander, were reprinted in the 2019 expansion Dimensions. Three expansions in 2017, X-Men, Spider-Man Homecoming and Marvel Noir contain a first printing promo card.

Cards from any of the sets can be combined within a game.

Core Sets
Title	Release year
Legendary	2012
Villains	2014
Marvel Studios Phase 1	2018
Marvel Studios What If...?	2023
Legendary: Second Edition	2026

Expansions Requiring a Base Set
Title	Release year
Dark City	2013
Fantastic Four	2013
Paint the Town Red	2014
Guardians of the Galaxy	2014
Fear Itself	2015
Secret Wars, Volume 1	2015
Secret Wars, Volume 2	2015
Captain America 75th Anniversary	2016
Civil War	2016
Deadpool	2016
Marvel Noir	2017
X-Men	2017
Spider-Man Homecoming	2017
Champions	2018
World War Hulk	2018
Ant-Man	2018
Venom	2019
Dimensions	2019
Revelations	2019
S.H.I.E.L.D.	2019
Heroes of Asgard	2020
The New Mutants	2020
Into the Cosmos	2020
Realm of Kings	2020
Annihilation	2021
Messiah Complex	2022
Doctor Strange and the Shadows of Nightmare	2022
Marvel Studios Guardians of the Galaxy	2022
Black Panther	2022
Black Widow	2022
Marvel Studios The Infinity Saga	2023
Midnight Sons	2023
Marvel Studios Ant-Man and the Wasp	2024
2099	2024
Weapon X	2024

== Reception ==
In a review of Legendary in Black Gate, Andrew Zimmerman Jones compared it with DC Comics Deck-building Game and said "I liked both games tremendously. I lean a bit toward Marvel Legendary, but not enough that I would recommend anyone against the DC Comics game if that was what they wanted to get."

Marvel Legendary has been consistently met with positive reviews from fans and critics, particularly regarding the original base game. This base game was a 2013 Origins Awards Best Traditional Card Game nominee and a 2013 Golden Geek Best Card Game nominee.

Upper Deck Entertainment released several other standalone versions of the Legendary game based on other franchises, including Alien, Buffy the Vampire Slayer, Game of Thrones, James Bond, The Matrix, and Predator.
