= Fire (The X-Files) =

- The X-Files episode
- Episode no.: Season 1 Episode 12
- Directed by: Larry Shaw
- Written by: Chris Carter
- Production code: 1X11
- Original air date: December 17, 1993
- Running time: 45 minutes

Guest appearances
- Amanda Pays as Phoebe Green; Mark Sheppard as Bob / Cecil L'Ively; Dan Lett as Sir Malcolm Marsden; Lynda Boyd as woman in bar; Laurie Paton as Lady Marsden

Episode chronology
← Previous "Eve"	Next → "Beyond the Sea"
- The X-Files season 1

"Fire" is the twelfth episode of the first season of the American science fiction television series The X-Files, premiering on the Fox network on December 17, 1993. It was written by series creator Chris Carter, directed by Larry Shaw and featured guest appearances by Mark Sheppard and Amanda Pays. The episode is a "Monster-of-the-Week" story, unconnected to the series' wider mythology. "Fire" earned a Nielsen household rating of 6.8, being watched by 6.4 million households in its initial broadcast; and received mostly positive reviews from critics.

The show centers on FBI agents Fox Mulder (David Duchovny) and Dana Scully (Gillian Anderson) who work on cases linked to the paranormal, called X-Files. In this episode, Mulder and Scully are visited by a Metropolitan Police detective who studied at Oxford University with Mulder; and who enlists their aid with a case involving a serial killer capable of pyrokinesis.

Due to its premise, the episode required a number of dangerous fire stunts to be performed. In one notable scene, Mulder and the antagonist Cecil L'Ively (Sheppard) face off at opposite ends of a corridor, with L'Ively setting the entire hallway ablaze. Due to the intense heat featured in the scene, Sheppard had to duck out of the shot to shield himself from injury; that said, during production, the only injury sustained on set occurred when Duchovny burned his hand, which left a small permanent scar. The character Phoebe Green, played by Pays, was initially considered for a recurring role, but this episode remains her sole appearance.

== Plot ==
In Bosham, England, a wealthy elderly man says goodbye to his wife before leaving for work, but suddenly catches fire in an apparent case of spontaneous human combustion. His family and house staff—including his Irish gardener, Cecil L'Ively—watch as he burns to death on his front lawn.

Later, in Washington, D.C., agents Fox Mulder and Dana Scully are met by Phoebe Green, an investigator from London's Metropolitan Police and Mulder's former lover from the University of Oxford. Green explains that a serial arsonist is targeting the British aristocracy, burning his victims alive while leaving no trace of evidence. The only links between the crimes are the suspect's love letters to the victims' wives. His latest target is Sir Malcolm Marsden, who is visiting Cape Cod for protection after escaping an attack by the killer. Mulder and Scully visit a pyrotechnics expert who says that only rocket fuel can burn hot enough to destroy evidence of its origins.

Mulder tells Scully that Green, with whom he had a complicated relationship, is using the case to play a mind game, exploiting his debilitating fear of fire. Meanwhile, L'Ively—having killed a caretaker and assumed his identity—greets the Marsden family as they arrive at their Cape Cod vacation home, faking an American accent. Unbeknownst to the Marsdens, L'Ively is painting a layer of rocket fuel onto the exterior of the house. L'Ively befriends the Marsdens' sick family driver, offering to go into town to get him some cough syrup. While there, he uses his pyrokinetic abilities to burn down a local bar purely for fun.

At the hospital, Mulder and Green interview a witness to the bar fire, who tells them of the assailant's apparent ability to will fire into existence. The Marsdens' driver becomes even sicker due to the poisoned cough syrup provided by L'Ively. Because of his illness, L'Ively is recruited to drive the family into Boston that night to attend a party at a luxury hotel. Mulder flies up to Boston to watch over the party with Green, hoping to set a trap for the suspect; Scully continues working on compiling a criminal profile of the killer.

Mulder and Green dance during the party and afterwards kiss; Scully arrives at the hotel and sees them. She also spots L'Ively in the lobby, watching her. A fire alarm goes off after a blaze starts in the Marsdens' room, where the children are located. Mulder attempts to rescue them but is overcome both by his phobia and the intense smoke; they are instead "saved" by L'Ively. When Mulder awakens, Scully questions "Bob" but is dismissed by Green, who believes the man is a long-time employee whose background checks out. Green tells Mulder that she will leave a few days after the Marsdens when they return to England the next day.

Scully discusses her research with Mulder, suspecting that L'Ively is the arsonist; this is confirmed by a police sketch taken from the witness' description. Upon reaching the Marsdens' house, the agents find the driver's charred body in the bathroom before the second floor bursts into flames. As Scully and Green escort the Marsdens to safety, Mulder faces his phobia and is able to save the Marsden children. Scully holds L'Ively at gunpoint but is forced to hold her fire when he informs her of the rocket fuel he has painted onto the house. Green throws a can of the rocket fuel in L'Ively's face, causing him to lose control and set himself alight outside.

With the case solved, Green returns to England with the Marsden family. Despite having sustained fifth and sixth degree burns over most of his body, L'Ively survives his immolation and is held in a medical facility as he awaits trial, healing at an alarming rate. The episode's final scene shows him asking a nurse for a cigarette.

== Production ==
The show's hairstylist in the first season was Malcolm Marsden, whose name is given to the threatened aristocrat in this episode. In the scene where Mulder and L'ively confront each other at either end of a corridor in the Marsden family home, and L'ively sets fire to the entire hallway, guest actor Mark Sheppard, who played L'ively, ducked out of the shot in order to protect himself from the intense heat. The only injury involved in the production was when Duchovny burned his hand, leaving a small permanent scar. The exterior shots of the Venable Plaza Hotel were shot in Hotel Vancouver which had, coincidentally, been rebuilt after burning to the ground. The interior shots used for the fire-based stunts were shot on a soundstage built to resemble the hotel's interior, while some stock footage was used for establishing shots. The exterior shots of the mansion at the beginning of the episode were filmed at a Vancouver mansion that had previously been used in the episode "The Jersey Devil".

The character of Phoebe Green was considered as a recurring role, but this episode ended up being her only appearance. Chris Carter explained the character's origins, saying, "I thought it was interesting to show a little bit of Mulder's history by bringing an old girlfriend back. I've always wanted to do a Scotland Yard detective who was a woman. I also thought it was an interesting chance to use Amanda Pays and make a villainess of her". Executive producer R. W. Goodwin felt that the episode "was a hard one. Any kind of a fire stunt is a major undertaking, because it involves so many overlapping things. It was a major feat, a real logical and creative feat, because you wanted it to look good".

== Broadcast and reception ==
"Fire" premiered on the Fox network on December 17, 1993. The episode earned a Nielsen household rating of 6.8, with a 12 share—meaning that roughly 6.8 percent of all television-equipped households, and 12 percent of households watching TV, were tuned in to the episode. "Fire" was viewed by 6.4 million households.

Series creator Chris Carter called "Fire" a "very popular episode, and I'm just somewhat happy with the way it turned out. Having written it and imagined it in certain ways, I think it could have been a lot better. Although I thought it was generally well directed, the show felt very 'wide' to me—very loose and lacking some things." A retrospective of the first season in Entertainment Weekly rated the episode a B, praising Mark Sheppard's "sizzling performance", though finding that the "annoying" character of Phoebe Green was a detriment to the episode, who kept "any real sparks from flying". Keith Phipps, writing for The A.V. Club, rated the episode a C, finding it "contrived and unnecessary", and feeling that the relationship between Mulder and Phoebe Green was not believable. Matt Haigh, writing for Den of Geek, felt that "Fire" was "a great episode", believing that it worked well for "highlighting the sexual tension between our two leads".

== Footnotes ==
=== References ===
- Edwards, Ted (1996). X-Files Confidential. Little, Brown and Company. ISBN 0-316-21808-1.
- Gradnitzer, Louisa; Pittson, Todd (1999). X Marks the Spot: On Location with The X-Files. Arsenal Pulp Press. ISBN 1-55152-066-4.
- Lovece, Frank (1996). The X-Files Declassified. Citadel Press. ISBN 0-8065-1745-X.
- Lowry, Brian (1995). The Truth is Out There: The Official Guide to the X-Files. Harper Prism. ISBN 0-06-105330-9.
