= Rubem Fonseca =

Brazilian writer (1925–2020)

Rubem Fonseca (May 11, 1925 – April 15, 2020) was a Brazilian writer.

== Life and career ==
He was born in Juiz de Fora, in the state of Minas Gerais, but he lived most of his life in Rio de Janeiro. In 1952, he started his career as a low-level cop and, later became a police commissioner, one of the highest ranks in the civil police of Brazil. Following the steps of American novelist Thomas Pynchon, a close friend of Fonseca, he refused to give interviews and felt strongly about maintaining his privacy.

His stories are dark and gritty, filled with violence and sexual content, and usually set in an urban environment. He claimed a writer should have the courage to show what most people are afraid to say. Authors from the rising generation of Brazilian writers, such as Patrícia Melo or Luiz Ruffato, have stated that Fonseca's writing has influenced their work.

He started his career by writing short stories, while first popular novel was A Grande Arte ("High Art"), followed by Agosto. One recurring character in Fonseca's books is the lawyer-detective Mandrake.

In 2003, he won the Camões Prize, considered the most important award in the Portuguese language, and in 2015 he was awarded the Machado de Assis Prize.

In 2012, he became the first recipient of Chile's Manuel Rojas Ibero-American Narrative Award.

He died in Rio de Janeiro in April 2020 at the age of 94.

== Bibliography ==
=== Brazilian editions ===
==== Novels and novellas ====
- O Caso Morel (1973)
- A Grande Arte (1983)
- Bufo & Spallanzani (1986)
- Vastas Emoções e Pensamentos Imperfeitos (1988)
- Agosto (1990)
- O Selvagem da Ópera (1994)
- Do Meio do Mundo Prostituto Só Amores Guardei ao Meu Charuto (1997, novella)
- O doente Molière (2000, novella)
- Diário de um Fescenino (2003)
- Mandrake: A Bíblia e a Bengala (2005, novella)
- O Seminarista (2009)
- José (2011)

==== Short story collections and anthologies ====
- Os Prisioneiros (1963)
- A Coleira do Cão (1965)
- Lúcia McCartney (1967)
- Feliz Ano Novo (1975)
- O Homem de Fevereiro ou Março (1973)
- O Cobrador (1979)
- Romance Negro e Outras Histórias (1992)
- Contos Reunidos (1994)
- O Buraco na Parede (1995)
- Romance Negro, Feliz Ano Novo e Outras Histórias (1996)
- Histórias de Amor (1997)
- Confraria dos Espadas (1998)
- Secreções, Excreções e Desatinos (2001)
- Pequenas Criaturas (2002)
- 64 Contos de Rubem Fonseca (2004)
- Ela e Outras Mulheres (2006)
- Axilas e Outras Histórias Indecorosas (2011)
- Histórias Curtas (2015)

=== English translations ===
- High Art (translation by Ellen Watson, Harper & Row, New York, 1986)
- Bufo & Spallanzani (translation by Clifford E. Landers, Dutton, New York, 1990)
- Vast Emotions and Imperfect Thoughts (translation by Clifford Landers, Ecco Press, New York, 1998)
- The Taker and Other Stories (translation by Clifford E. Landers, Open Letter, New York, 2008)
- Winning the Game and Other Stories (translation by Clifford E. Landers, Tagus Press, Dartmouth, Mass 2013)
- Crimes of August (translation by Clifford E. Landers of Agosto, University of Massachusetts Press, Amherst, Mass., 2014)
