= Leviathan (1989 film) =

1989 film by George P. Cosmatos

- Theatrical release poster by John Alvin
- Directed by: George P. Cosmatos
- Written by: David Peoples; Jeb Stuart
- Produced by: Aurelio De Laurentiis; Luigi De Laurentiis; Charles Gordon; Lawrence Gordon
- Starring: Peter Weller; Richard Crenna; Amanda Pays; Daniel Stern; Ernie Hudson; Michael Carmine; Lisa Eilbacher; Héctor Elizondo
- Cinematography: Alex Thomson
- Edited by: John F. Burnett; Roberto Silvi
- Music by: Jerry Goldsmith
- Production companies: Metro-Goldwyn-Mayer; Filmauro
- Distributed by: MGM/UA Communications Co. (United States); Filmauro (Italy)
- Release dates: March 17, 1989 (United States); September 22, 1989 (Italy)
- Running time: 103 minutes
- Countries: United States; Italy
- Language: English
- Budget: $21 million
- Box office: $19 million (US/Italy)

Leviathan is a 1989 science fiction horror film directed by George P. Cosmatos and written by David Webb Peoples and Jeb Stuart. An international co-production of the United States and Italy, it stars Peter Weller, Richard Crenna, Ernie Hudson, Amanda Pays and Daniel Stern as the crew of an underwater geological facility stalked and killed by a hideous mutant creature. The creature effects were designed by Academy Award-winning special effects artist Stan Winston.

Leviathan was released around the same time as other, similarly themed "underwater" science fiction and horror films including The Abyss and DeepStar Six (both 1989), and received generally negative reviews from critics, who cited numerous similarities to films such as Alien (1979) and The Thing (1982).

== Plot ==
Ms. Martin, the CEO of Tri-Oceanic Corp., hires geologist Steven Beck to supervise an undersea mining operation for three months. The crew consists of members Glen "Doc" Thompson, Elizabeth "Willie" Williams, Buzz "Sixpack" Parrish, Justin Jones, Tony DeJesus Rodero, Bridget Bowman and G.P. Cobb. While working outside their deep-sea station in a pressure suit, Sixpack discovers a Soviet shipwreck, Leviathan. The crew salvages a safe from Leviathan, finding records detailing the deaths of several crew members as well as a video log from the captain. Sixpack also finds a flask of vodka which he shares with Bowman. Doc and Beck review the captain's video, which describes puzzling medical problems amongst his crew. They also discover that Leviathan was scuttled.

The following morning, Sixpack feels sick and Doc discovers lesions along his back. Sixpack dies a few hours later, but Doc and Beck keep it quiet to avoid a panic. Doc checks the crew to confirm no one else is showing Sixpack's symptoms but does not have the chance to examine Bowman. While Beck and Doc confer with Martin on the surface, Bowman begins feeling ill. She finds Sixpack's corpse, which is mutating and growing. When Bowman's hair starts falling out, she realizes the same thing is happening to her. Beck and Doc request emergency evacuation, but Martin reports a severe storm on the surface that will delay evacuation for twelve hours.

Doc finds that Bowman has committed suicide. Her body is taken to the station's sick bay, where it merges with Sixpack's. When Doc and Beck discover the mutating bodies, they decide to dump both in the ocean. Just as they are about to "flush" the cadavers, the body bag begins squirming. Believing someone inside may be alive, the crew opens it. The creature inside claws Cobb before they eject it. The team realizes that Leviathan was experimenting on its unwitting crew with mutagens containing piscine DNA. The mutagen was mixed with the vodka that the crew, and later Sixpack and Bowman, drank. The ship was scuttled when the experiment spiraled out of control.

A tentacle that was severed when the corpses were ejected mutates into a lamprey-like creature that attacks DeJesus in the kitchen. Jones seals the kitchen's pressure doors and goes for help. He asks Cobb to watch the door, but when he searches for a weapon, the creature assimilates DeJesus and rips its way out of the kitchen. It then grows tentacles that attack the crew.

The creature attacks the medical bay, devouring blood and plasma from the cooler. This inspires Beck to use a pint of his blood to attract the monster, then attempt to flush it the same way they did with the Sixpack and Bowman creature. Doc ejects the escape pods so that no one can escape and risk bringing the mutagen to the surface. Beck consults with Martin for emergency evacuation. Martin assures them that they will not be left behind, but that she cannot carry out the rescue because of a hurricane.

Cobb's injuries worsen, causing him to mutate and infect Doc. Williams escapes as Beck and Jones try trapping the creature. They escape to another part of the station. The crew tries accessing weather information through the computer, but it is blocked. Williams asks the computer for a financial report from the company and they discover that Tri-Oceanic Corporation has declared them dead, labeling it an accident.

The creature damages vital systems, causing the pressure to drop and an implosion to occur. They decide to use their dive suits to escape. The creature attacks them, but is crushed by the lift as Beck escapes. They make it to the surface, which is calm and sunny. As they are met by a Coast Guard helicopter, the first mutant surfaces nearby and tries to take Jones. Jones keeps it from escaping at the cost of his own life and Beck throws a demolition charge into the creature's mouth, causing it to explode.

After they are dropped off on a Tri-Oceanic oil drilling platform, the two survivors are greeted by Martin. Martin tells them she believed they would make it, smiling and asking how Beck feels. Beck punches Martin in the face and answers, "Better. A lot better."

== Cast ==
- Peter Weller as Steven Beck
- Richard Crenna as Dr. Glen "Doc" Thompson
- Amanda Pays as Elizabeth "Willie" Williams
- Daniel Stern as Buzz "Sixpack" Parrish
- Ernie Hudson as Justin Jones
- Michael Carmine as Tony "DeJesus" Rodero
- Lisa Eilbacher as Bridget "Bow" Bowman
- Héctor Elizondo as G.P. Cobb
- Meg Foster as Ms. Martin
- Eugene Lipinski as Russian Captain
- Tom Woodruff Jr. as Lead Creature

== Production ==
Leviathan was directed by George P. Cosmatos, who had previously directed the Sylvester Stallone-starring action films Rambo: First Blood Part II and Cobra. The screenplay was written by David Webb Peoples (Blade Runner) and Jeb Stuart (Die Hard). Oscar-nominated and BSC Award-winning cinematographer Alex Thomson served as the film's director of photography. Four-time Oscar-winning visual effects designer Stan Winston was responsible for the creature effects.

== Soundtrack ==
Leviathan

Film score by Jerry Goldsmith
- Released: 17 April 1989
- Recorded: 1989
- Genre: Soundtrack
- Length: 39:42

The score to the film was written by veteran composer Jerry Goldsmith, conducting The Accademia di Santa Cecilia Orchestra at Forum Studio. Goldsmith used a number of creative ways to identify the score to the film, such as incorporating the use of recorded whale sounds into the music during the opening credits. The soundtrack was released through Varèse Sarabande in 1989 and features eleven tracks of score with a running time just under forty minutes.

== Reception ==
=== Box office ===
The film opened on March 17, 1989, in 1,393 theaters and earned $5,029,164 over its opening weekend, placing second. It went on to gross $15,704,614 in the United States and Canada. In Italy, it grossed $3.2 million.

=== Critical response ===
The film was received poorly by critics and currently has a 26% rating on Rotten Tomatoes based on 27 reviews, with an average rating of 4.90 out of 10. The site's critics consensus reads, "A deep-sea thriller with an unusually strong cast and potent ideas, Leviathan quickly plunges into an abyss of weak thrills and lame kills." On Metacritic, the film has a weighted average score of 51 out of 100 based on 12 critic reviews, indicating "mixed or average" reviews.

Writing for The New York Times, Janet Maslin was reserved in her praise and wrote that it "compares favorably with the other recent aquatic horror film Deepstar Six but probably not with anything else" and that "The latter half of the film is one long feeding frenzy, guided by a familiar horror-film principle: survival of the best-looking." Movie critic for the Chicago Tribune, Dave Kehr, criticized the movie, writing "In the dumb fun department, Leviathan is the movie of the moment-a lively, well-made schlock thriller that will doubtlessly be forgotten in two weeks." Regarding the film's writing he wrote, "The script has been attributed to David Peoples and Jeb Stuart (Die Hard), but it plays more like a collection of random pages from Alien, The Thing, Outland and Run Silent, Run Deep."

On their Siskel & Ebert series, Roger Ebert gave the film a thumbs up as a moderately effective, if clichéd, thriller, while his colleague Gene Siskel gave it a thumbs down, calling it a ripoff of several films that have come before it but nonetheless highlighting performances by Peter Weller and Amanda Pays.

== Home media ==
Leviathan was first released to DVD on September 29, 1998. Sean Carlson of IGN compared the DVD release of Leviathan to that of DeepStar Six, giving the DVD 8 of 10 stars, praising the video quality but criticizing the audio and mentioning the only extra was the film's trailer. The film was released on Blu-ray by Scream Factory in August 2014.

Kino Lorber announced in May 2022 that they would give the film a restoration and release it on Ultra HD Blu-ray.

== See also ==
- List of underwater science fiction works
