= The Taker and Other Stories =

Collection of short crime fiction stories set in Brazil

First edition

The Taker and Other Stories is a collection of short crime fiction stories by Brazilian writer Rubem Fonseca. The stories have a wide range in page length and in severity of crimes, but all follow themes of class inequality, justice, and, entitlement. For instance, in the story of "The Taker" the main character feels entitled to everything. He feels that those in society who have something he doesn't owe him that thing. So, he takes it. The criminals usually feel justified in their own actions and treat things such as murder as things that have to be done. In the stories "Night Drive" and "The Other" the main character seems to commit his crime or crimes for the sake of his own sanity. Christopher Ballantyne remarks on Fonseca's inclination to examine order in a world of violence. Even though his publication came out before this collection of short stories was released, his point holds true for this piece of Fonseca's work as well as his older ones. He notes that, above all, this is what Fonseca's work excels at doing. "The Taker and Other Stories" also presents many different worlds caught between violence and order.

== Reception ==
Dan Bevacqua of Words Without Borders gave the collection a positive review that praises Rubem Fonseca's ability to convey class inequalities in an interesting way and his style that makes the stories seem like they are confessions from their characters. He does however note that the collection lacks something in subtlety and can be improved in that front. The review given by Publishers Weekly is complementary to the individual stories but has a negative view on the collection as a whole. It notes that the constant barrage of grimness leaves the reader weary, and gets a bit too repetitive when read all together. Still it finds that Fonesca's style is entertaining and will please many fans of South American fiction in the world.

According to WorldCat, the book is in 212 libraries.
