= Michael Carmine =

American actor (1959–1989)

- Born: March 6, 1959; New York City, U.S.
- Died: October 14, 1989 (aged 30); New York City, U.S.
- Occupation: Actor
- Years active: 1977–1989

Michael Carmine (March 6, 1959 – October 14, 1989) was an American actor.

== Early life ==
Carmine was born in Flatbush, Brooklyn. He graduated from the High School of Performing Arts at the age of sixteen, and went on to study acting at the California Institute of the Arts.

== Career ==
He made his first film appearance as an extra in the disaster film Rollercoaster (1977) and played his first speaking part on Hill Street Blues in 1982. A small role in Brian De Palma's Scarface (1983) was followed by the role of Snake in Michael Mann's television series Miami Vice, which led to his first major role in Mann's Band of the Hand (1986), directed by Paul Michael Glaser.

On stage, Carmine appeared in both Broadway and Off-Broadway productions of Reinaldo Povod's play Cuba and His Teddy Bear. He also played Papo in Povod's La Puta Vida.

Carmine went on to appear in supporting roles in the films Batteries Not Included (1987) and Leviathan (1989). In his final role, he played an AIDS patient in the drama film Longtime Companion (also 1989).

== Death ==
Carmine died of AIDS on 14 October 1989. He was 30 years old.

== Filmography ==
=== Film ===
Year	Title	Role	Notes
1985	Invasion U.S.A.	Tonio	
1986	Band of the Hand	Ruben	
1987	Batteries Not Included	Carlos	
1989	Leviathan	Tony "DeJesus" Rodero	
1989	Longtime Companion	Alberto	Final film role

=== Television ===
Year	Title	Role	Notes
1982	Hill Street Blues	Car Thief	Episode: "Some Like It Hot-Wired"
1982	Hill Street Blues	Screaming Youth	Episode: "The Shooter"
1982	M*A*S*H	Patient	Episode: "Bombshells"
1983	ABC Afterschool Special	Vato Loco	Episode: "But It's Not My Fault"
1985	Search for Tomorrow	Rollo	8 episodes
1985–1987	Miami Vice	"Snake" / Mikey	2 episodes
1987	Leg Work	Marcus	Episode: "Peaches"
1987–1988	Crime Story	Louie Rivera	2 episodes
1988	Tour of Duty	Rudy Morales	Episode: "Soldiers"
