= A Grande Arte =

1991 film directed by Walter Salles

- DVD cover
- Directed by: Walter Salles Jr.
- Screenplay by: Rubem Fonesca; Matthew Chapman (English version)
- Based on: A Grande Arte by Rubem Fonesca
- Produced by: Paulo Carlos De Brito; Alberto Flaksman
- Starring: Peter Coyote; Tchéky Karyo; Amanda Pays; Raul Cortez
- Cinematography: José Roberto Eliezer
- Edited by: Isabelle Rathery
- Music by: Todd Boekelheide; Jürgen Knieper
- Production companies: Alpha Filmes; J&M Entertainment
- Distributed by: Miramax Films (U.S. Theatrical)
- Release date: June 1991 (Noir in Festival)
- Running time: 104 minutes (Spain); 99 minutes (U.S. Video)
- Country: Brazil
- Languages: English; Portuguese; Spanish
- Box office: $356,825 (United States)

A Grande Arte (Portuguese for 'The Great Art'), released in the United States as Exposure, is a 1991 Brazilian film directed by Walter Salles Jr. and starring Peter Coyote. Loosely based on the book A Grande Arte by Brazilian Rubem Fonseca, it is one of the first theatrical works of Salles Jr. The cast includes Brazilian and international stars such as Coyote, Tchéky Karyo and Amanda Pays.

== Plot ==
Peter Mandrake, an American photographer in Brazil, is preparing an in loco essay for his new book, about the "train surfers" (groups of boys who court danger "surfing" on the roof of the trains) in the city of Rio de Janeiro. A local call girl with whom he is friends is murdered, and when the police can make no progress Mandrake decides to investigate himself. Subsequently, two hired thugs break into his apartment demanding a disk, and, when he doesn't produce it because he can't do so, they rape his girlfriend and stab him, leaving him to die. Vowing revenge, Mandrake enlists the help of Hermes, a professional knife fighter who owes Mandrake a debt, to teach him the art of knife-fighting. The obsession this develops into causes Mandrake's girlfriend to leave him, wanting the whole thing to simply go away, but Mandrake refuses to let go.

The thugs are discovered to be working for an undisclosed Brazilian criminal organization closely tied with the Bolivian cocaine cartel. The head of the organization is attempting to uncover a traitor in his organization, who apparently stole a floppy disk containing important information. Mandrake allies himself with some of the organization's rivals to help them find the disk, in return for discovering who killed the call girl. The disk is ultimately found, and Mandrake learns that the organization head murdered the call girl himself, slashing her face in an act of arrogance. Hermes appears suddenly, and the head orders him to kill Mandrake, but Hermes tells him to do it himself before leaving. They violently fight, and Mandrake manages to stab his opponent to death.

However, the fulfillment of his revenge quest leaves Mandrake feeling empty and without purpose. He wanders for a while before, on a whim, taking a picture of a couple kissing in a window. This reinvigorates his passion for photography, and, whereas he used to take pictures of violent and dangerous situations, now his work has a theme of love and simple pleasures. He heads out to the plains to see his girlfriend, who is an archaeologist working on-site. After showing her the pictures, he tells her he's been assigned to Africa, but promises to return someday.

== Knife culture ==
The film explores the mysterious and hidden world of the "Persevs" (a portmanteau of the words perforate and sever) fighters and some famous knifesmiths, such as Rex Applegate and William. E. Fairbairn, Bo Randall (whose assault knife "Randall 14" is a key weapon in the film) and Joe Kious.

== Cast ==
- Peter Coyote as Peter Mandrake, the photographer
- Tchéky Karyo as Hermes, the knife fight master
- Amanda Pays as Mariet, Mandrake's girlfriend
- Raul Cortez as Thales de Lima Prado
- Giulia Gam as Gisela the hooker
- Tonico Pereira as Rafael
- Eduardo Conde as Roberto Mitry
- Miguel Ángel Fuentes as Camilo Fuentes

== Production ==
The movie was filmed on location on Rio de Janeiro streets (usually at night) and in the highlands of Bolivia and Pantanal. It was the first feature film directed by Walter Salles Jr., who had been known primarily for his documentaries. He later directed films such as Diários de Motocicleta (The Motorcycle Diaries) and the horror remake Dark Water.
