= Computer Dreams =

- Directed by: Geoffrey de Valois
- Written by: Alan Bloom; Geoffrey de Valois; Rhyena Halpern; Peter Sorenson
- Produced by: Geoffrey de Valois; Rhyena Halpern; Norio Sugano
- Narrated by: Amanda Pays
- Cinematography: Geoffrey de Valois
- Edited by: Geoffrey de Valois; Rhyena Halpern
- Production company: Digital Vision Entertainment
- Distributed by: MPI Home Video
- Release date: 1988
- Running time: 58 minutes
- Country: United States

Computer Dreams is a 1988 film created by Digital Vision Entertainment and released by MPI Home Video. Written, produced and directed by Geoffrey de Valois and hosted by Amanda Pays, it consists primarily of clips and behind-the-scenes work of early computer graphics animation. Notably included are Luxo Jr. and Red's Dream, the first two short films from Pixar. The film is an hour long and features an electronic score by Music Fantastic. It was revised and re-released on DVD as The History of Computer Animation, Volume 2. It won the Winner Gold Special Jury Award at the 1989 Houston International Film Festival, and the 1989 Golden Decade Award from the US Film & Video Festival.

Music used includes: Gail Lennon - Desire, Gail Lennon - Like A Dream, Shandi Sinnamon - Making It,
