= The Cold Room =

1984 cable television film directed by James Dearden

- VHS cover art
- Based on: The Cold Room by Jeffrey Caine
- Written by: James Dearden
- Directed by: James Dearden
- Starring: George Segal; Amanda Pays; Renée Soutendijk; Warren Clarke; Anthony Higgins
- Music by: Michael Nyman
- Country of origin: United Kingdom
- Original language: English

Production
- Producers: Mark Forstater; Bob Weiss
- Cinematography: Tony Pierce-Roberts
- Editor: Mick Audsley
- Running time: 95 minutes
- Production company: HBO Premiere Films

Original release
- Network: HBO
- Release: 24 March 1984

The Cold Room is a 1984 cable television film by James Dearden.

Based on an eponymous 1978 science fiction novel by Jeffrey Caine, the film stars George Segal, Amanda Pays (in her film debut), Anthony Higgins, Renée Soutendijk, and Warren Clarke. The original film score is by Michael Nyman. It was a production of MCEG/Sterling Entertainment and released on VHS by Charter Entertainment.

== Plot ==
Carla Martin (Amanda Pays) is leaving an English parochial boarding school for the summer to live with her estranged father at an inn in East Berlin. The headmistress (Ursula Howells), a nun, gives her a 1936 guide to Berlin, telling Carla that she may find it useful, even though Berlin has surely changed as much as she has. Her best friend, Sophie (Lucy Hornack), gives her a bag of marijuana.

Hugh Martin (George Segal), her father, who lives on Central Park West, greets her at the Berlin Airport, surprised at how grown she looks. Carla is a bit embarrassed that he has given her a teddy bear, as she is nearly seventeen years old. She addresses him on a first name basis, and a camera pan reveals that he just bought the teddy bear at the airport. As they cross through the Berlin Wall, Carla is terrified that she will be personally searched and caught with drugs.

Hugh has a thirty-year-old girlfriend named Lili (Renée Soutendijk), who recommends Frau Hoffman's (Elizabeth Spriggs) inn because of the local character being significant to Hugh's historical research. Carla is convinced that there are rats behind the wall and wants to leave. Hugh has Frau Hoffman humor her and show her that there is merely a broom closet next door, though that room is not deep enough to convince her. Hugh insists it's probably just part of the next room.

Carla sees flashes of another girl in the wardrobe mirror, starts tapping the wall behind it and gets taps back, and tearing away at the wallpaper, she opens the wall to find a disused cold room, for the hotel was once a butcher's shop and home, and a Jewish dissident named Erich (Anthony Higgins) hiding inside. She begins sneaking him food from the hotel kitchen, along with utensils and her father's razor, to help him. Carla is experiencing two realities, one in the 1980s when she is Carla Martin and another in 1936, when she is Christa Bruckner (Justina Vail). Christa is the daughter of butcher Wilhelm Bruckner (Warren Clarke), a member of the Nazi Party who calls her a "little slut" and rapes her in the night. Christa also has lines of cuts in both of her palms. Carla is ashamed by the rape and scrubs herself thoroughly in the bathtub.

Hugh is concerned that Carla may be going insane like her mother did and finally makes good on his insistence at having her seen by a doctor (George Pravda). When the doctor comes, she has stripped the sheets on her bed for their dirtiness and is not wearing anything under the bed covers, so her father steps out for the examination. The doctor cannot find anything wrong, and when she tells him that her father raped her the night before and asks him to examine her, he sees only inflammation from the scrub brush and identifies her as virgo intacta—she was not raped.

Christa and Erich begin lovemaking, as Christa fears she is pregnant by her father and psychologically needs to have the possibility that any baby born is Erich's. She carves their names into a cross centered on the letter I on the wall of the cold room. Soon after, Hugh finds her huddled in a nightgown inside the wardrobe, which is filled with rotten food. Hugh and Lili get her dressed and take her out of the hotel. As they are getting into the car, Herr Bruckner drags her back into the butcher shop and insists he needs her for deliveries. In reality, this is to give Frau Hoffman time to reveal Erich to the Gestapo. When they return, Moltke (Clifford Rose), who had previously interrogated her about a visit to a Jewish man referred to her by Erich (something Carla was not able to accomplish in her own experience), is waiting in her bedroom. Erich shot one of Moltke's men, and Moltke killed him.

Hugh and Lili carry Carla back to the room with Frau Hoffman's assistance. When Carla regains consciousness, she begins accusing Frau Hoffman of having killed Erich. Not being able to tell Hugh from Herr Bruckner, she stabs him in the chest near the shoulder with a knife she has hidden. Coming to her senses, she and Lili ride with him in the ambulance.

Hugh now with his arm in a sling, the police are called to open the wall behind the wardrobe, which Carla had never actually opened. The planks Herr Bruckner had sealed it up with are removed, and Carla investigates it, filled with rats as she initially suspected, discovering the place where Christa and Erich's names are carved into the wall. Frau Hoffman is unable to hide her shame. Hugh takes Carla back to the airport to live with her aunt, with whom she lived prior to boarding school.

== Production ==
The film was shot over the course of eight weeks on a $4 million budget in West Berlin. The film was based on the 1976 novel of the same name by Jeffrey Caine. Producer Mark Forstater had attempted for two years to get financial backing for a theatrical adaptation of The Cold Room, but when this failed HBO teamed with Forstater on the film agreeing to co-finance it in exchange for first run broadcast rights, though Forstater hoped he could convince HBO to hold out for a theatrical run if the opportunity presented itself.

== Soundtrack album ==
The Cold Room
- The Cold Room art by Crimson photograph by Martyn Goddard

Soundtrack album by Michael Nyman
- Released: 1995
- Recorded: 1984
- Genre: Contemporary classical music, film scores, minimalism
- Length: 35:11
- Label: Silva America
- Producer: Michael Nyman; Ford A. Thaxton

Michael Nyman chronology
The Draughtsman's Contract (1982)	The Cold Room (1984)	The Kiss and Other Movements (1985)

The original music for the film was performed by the Wembley Studio Chamber Orchestra and recorded at The Music Centre, CTS Studios, London.

=== Track listing ===
1. Main Theme
2. The Nightmare Begins
3. The Closet
4. Sorcerer
5. Sounds of the Night
6. Her Man Awaits
7. Ghosts of the Past
8. The Damned
9. Thoughtful
10. Spectral Moments
11. Macabre Piano
12. A Cold Spot
13. Red Drum
14. Chase
15. The Nightmare Ends
16. Main Theme – Reprise

=== Personnel ===
- Music composed, arranged, and produced by Michael Nyman
- Performed by the Wembley Studio Chamber Orchestra
- Recorded at The Music Centre, CTS Studios, London
- Recording Engineer: Pete Wandless
- Assistant: Keith Bourdice
