= Amanda Pays =

British actress (born 1959)

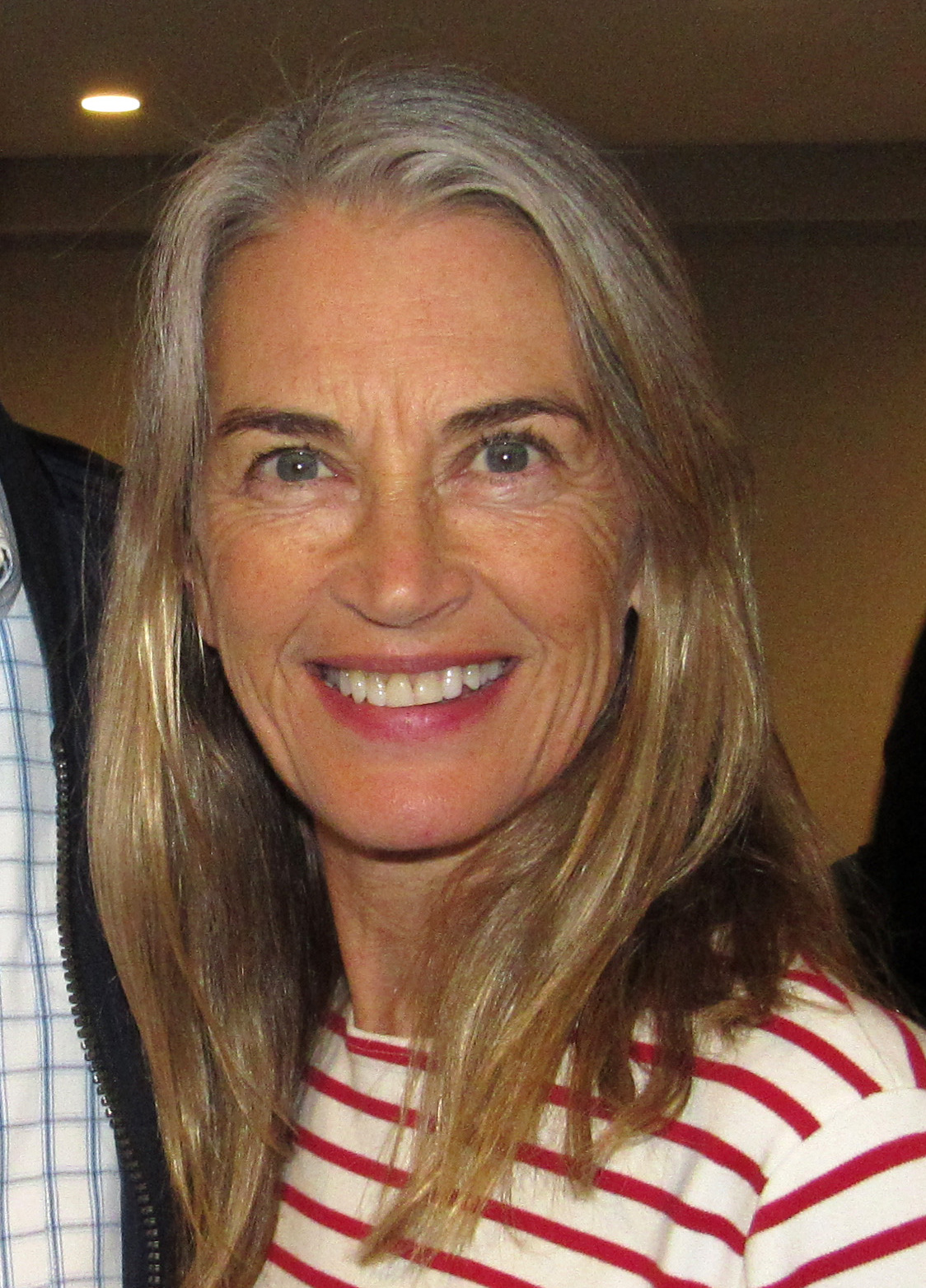
- Pays in 2018
- Born: 6 June 1959 (age 67); London, England
- Occupations: Actress; interior designer
- Years active: 1984–present
- Spouses: Peter Kohn (m. 1984; div. 1987) Corbin Bernsen (m. 1988)
- Children: 4
- Parents: Howard Pays; Jan Miller
- Relatives: Mandy Miller (aunt)

Amanda Pays (born 6 June 1959) is an English interior designer, actress, and television presenter.

She is known for her television series roles as Theora Jones in Max Headroom and as Tina McGee in The Flash and the 2014 series of the same name. As an interior designer, Pays hosts the show Breathing Room on Fine Living Network.

== Early life ==
Pays was born on 6 June 1959 in London, the daughter of actors Jan Miller and Howard Pays. Her aunt is the former child actress Mandy Miller.

== Career ==
Pays made her film debut in The Cold Room. She then acted in Oxford Blues (1984) and she played a French nun, Sister Nicole, in Off Limits (1988 film) with Willem Dafoe, Gregory Hines and Fred Ward. Pays also had a guest role as Phoebe Green in the episode "Fire" (1993) of The X-Files, in the episode "Cindy Plumb" (2006) of Nip/Tuck, and in the episode "Black and Tan: A Crime of Fashion" (2008) of Psych, opposite her husband Corbin Bernsen.

She also appeared in early 1980s music videos, including those for "Love Shadow" by Fashion and "Smooth Operator" by Sade.

Pays is an interior designer and hosts Fine Living Network's Breathing Room.

She made her television debut in the dual role of Carla Martin and Christa Bruckner in the 1984 cable film The Cold Room, portrayed Sarah in the 1985 miniseries AD (known as Anno Domini in some releases), and narrated the 1988 documentary Computer Dreams. She also appeared in the low-budget 1987 horror film The Kindred and 1989's Leviathan.

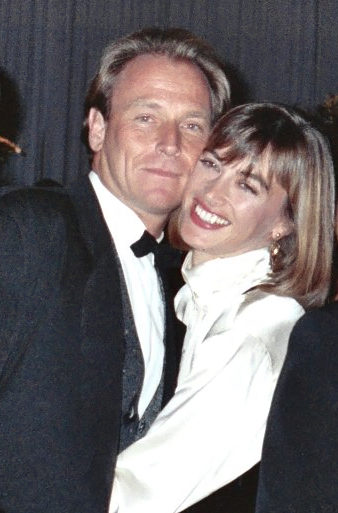
Amanda Pays with husband Corbin Bernsen at the Emmy Awards Governor's Ball, August 1990

In 1985 she played Nikki South in the television film Minder on the Orient Express, alongside Dennis Waterman and George Cole.

Pays was cast in the 2014 The Flash series to play a reimagined version of the character she played in the first series.

== Personal life ==
From 1984 until her 1987 divorce, Pays was married to Peter Kohn, the son of producer John Kohn and the grandson of producer Sam Jaffe. On 19 November 1988, Pays married American actor Corbin Bernsen, with whom she has four sons. Her mother-in-law was The Young and the Restless actress Jeanne Cooper.

== Filmography ==
Film
Year	Title	Role
1984	Oxford Blues	Lady Victoria Wingate
1986	The Frog Prince	
1987	The Kindred	Melissa Leftridge
1988	Off Limits	Nicole
1989	Leviathan	Elizabeth "Willie" Williams
1991	A Grande Arte	Mariet
1995	Solitaire for 2	Katie Burrough
1996	Subterfuge	Alex
1997	Spacejacked	Dawn
2001	Ablaze	Jennifer Lewis
2020	Mary for Mayor	Olivia
2020	Wake Up To Love	Claudia Brady

Television
Year	Title	Role	Notes
1984	The Cold Room	Carla Martin/Christa Bruckner	
1985	AD	Sarah	5 episodes
1985	Thirteen at Dinner	Geraldine Marsh	
1985	Dempsey and Makepeace	Tiffany Grace	1 episode
1985	Mr. and Mrs. Edgehill	Vivienne	
1984	Minder on the Orient Express	Nikki South	Television film
1985	Max Headroom: 20 Minutes into the Future	Theora Jones	Television film
1987–1988	Max Headroom	Theora Jones	
1988	CBS Summer Playhouse	Alexandra Greer	1 episode
1990	Parker Kane	Sarah Taylor	
1990–1991	The Flash	Christina "Tina" McGee	Some episodes were edited into films and released on videocassette as: The Flash (1990); The Flash II: Revenge of the Trickster (1991); Flash III: Deadly Nightshade (1992)
1991	Dead on the Money	Jennifer Ashford	
1993	Age of Treason	Helena	
1993	Sade – Life Promise Pride Love	Gangster's Girlfriend (segment "Smooth Operator")	
1993	The X-Files	Phoebe Green	Episode: "Fire"
1994	I Know My Son is Alive	Katherine Elshant	
1997	Hollywood Confidential	Joan Travers	
1996–1998	Thief Takers	Anna Dryden	
1999	Vengeance Unlimited	Gail Dawson	Episode: "Vendetta"
1999	7th Heaven	Emily Grant	Episode: "Sometimes That's Just the Way It Is"
1999	It's Like, You Know...	Angela Blendal	1 episode
1999	Martial Law	Dr. Broderick	1 episode
1999	Any Day Now	Helen	1 episode
2000	Grapevine	Paulina	1 episode
2002	Breathing Room	Host	
2002	The Santa Trap	Doris Spivak	
2006	Nip/Tuck	Interior Designer	1 episode
2008	Psych	Susan B	1 episode: "Black and Tan: A Crime of Fashion"
2014–2016	The Flash	Dr. Christina "Tina" McGee	5 episodes

Video game
Year	Title	Role
1996	Privateer 2: The Darkening	Assassin #3
