= Tina McGee =

Fictional character appearing in The Flash

- Tina McGee from The Flash (vol. 2) #3, art by Jackson Guice

Publication information
- Publisher: DC Comics
- First appearance: The Flash (vol. 2) #3 (August 1987)
- Created by: Mike Baron (writer); Jackson Guice (artist)

In-story information
- Alter ego: Tina McGee
- Team affiliations: S.T.A.R. Labs
- Supporting character of: Flash

Tina McGee is a fictional character appearing in The Flash comic book series published by DC Comics. She first appeared in The Flash (vol. 2) #3. Tina McGee is a nutritionist and researcher for S.T.A.R. Labs.

Tina McGee made her live action debut in the 1990 television series The Flash as part of the main cast portrayed by Amanda Pays who later reprised the role as a recurring character in The CW television series The Flash set in a different continuity.

== Fictional character biography ==
Tina McGee originally received a grant from Harvard to study Wally West's metabolism. Her husband Jerry McGee turned into the Speed Demon, the homicidal speedster before reforming and giving up the steroids behind the artificial speed. Tina and the Flash grew into a romantic relationship despite their age differences and Tina was legally still married at the time; she moves in with Wally. Various stresses, including Wally's domineering mother, break apart their bond.

Tina McGee and Wally West realize their feelings for each other in The Flash (vol. 2) #4. Artist: Jackson Guice

The Flash loses his speed due to alien influence. Tina leads a research project, based at the Pacific Institute, into restoring it. This causes Wally's speed to drastically increase, leaving a trail of destruction across the country. Tina teams up with Mason Trollbridge, her now recovered ex and the Flash's older detective friend. While the trio quest to find the addled Wally, Tina and Jerry get back together.

Later, Tina and Jerry unwittingly unleash the robotic intelligence Kilg%re among their own university colleagues. At this point, the entity is non-violent; despite taking over many of the people at the facility, all it wanted was to deeply experience life.

Jerry and Tina become employees at Central City's S.T.A.R. Labs. They assist the Flash multiple times, such as taking care of his injured ally Cyborg.

Tina is later head of the facility. She heads a project to discover what had happened to the speedster-empowering Speed Force with Bart Allen who was seemingly the only surviving speedster at the time.

== Other versions ==
In a possible future timeline observed by the time traveler Waverider, a super-powered crime lord threatens Tina McGee's life to force Jerry to make anti-Flash weaponry in an attempt to draw Wally West out of the Witness Protection Program. In this alternate future, Tina is still working at S.T.A.R. Labs; her colleague Chunk is murdered to force her cooperation.

== In other media ==
Tina McGee as she appears in The Flash (1990).

- Tina McGee appears in The Flash (1990), portrayed by Amanda Pays. This version aids in Barry Allen's crimefighting endeavors.
- Tina McGee makes a cameo appearance in Robot Chicken DC Comics Special 2: Villains in Paradise.
- Tina McGee appears in The Flash (2014), portrayed again by Amanda Pays. This version is the director of Mercury Labs (a rival tech firm to S.T.A.R. Labs), a friend of Harrison Wells and Henry Allen, and a multiversal doppelganger of The Flash (1990) incarnation.
- The Flash (1990) incarnation of Tina McGee appears in "Crisis on Infinite Earths" via archival footage. By this time, she had married Barry and died.
