= The Flash (1990 TV series) =

American television series

- Genre: Action; Drama; Superhero; Crime drama; Science fiction
- Based on: Barry Allen by: Robert Kanigher; Carmine Infantino
- Developed by: Danny Bilson; Paul De Meo
- Starring: John Wesley Shipp; Amanda Pays; Alex Désert
- Theme music composer: Danny Elfman
- Composer: Shirley Walker
- Country of origin: United States
- Original language: English
- No. of seasons: 1
- No. of episodes: 22

Production
- Executive producers: Danny Bilson; Paul De Meo
- Producers: Don Kurt; Gail Morgan Hickman
- Cinematography: Sandi Sissel; John Newby; Francis Kenny; Greg Gardiner
- Camera setup: Multi-camera
- Running time: 93 minutes (pilot); 44–48 minutes
- Production companies: Pet Fly Productions; Warner Bros. Television

Original release
- Network: CBS
- Release: September 20, 1990 – May 18, 1991

The Flash is an American television series developed by the writing team of Danny Bilson and Paul De Meo that aired on CBS from September 20, 1990 to May 18, 1991. It is based on the DC Comics character Barry Allen / Flash, a costumed superhero crime-fighter with the power to move at superhuman speeds. The Flash starred John Wesley Shipp as Allen, along with Amanda Pays and Alex Désert.

Multiple references to the series have been made on the 2014 Flash television series, including Shipp portraying multiple characters. Shipp also reprised his role as Barry Allen from this series in the crossovers "Elseworlds" and "Crisis on Infinite Earths", which established The Flash as existing on a parallel Earth to the Arrowverse series called Earth-90, while Pays, Désert, and Mark Hamill reprised their roles as alternate versions of Tina McGee, Julio Mendez and the Trickster in the main Arrowverse.

== Summary ==
Barry Allen, a forensic scientist working for the Central City police, is struck by lightning and doused in chemicals in his lab. He develops superspeed and creates a superhero identity for himself to fight crime: The Flash. Research scientist Dr. Tina McGee works at S.T.A.R. Labs and helps Barry fight crime while trying to understand how his powers are developing. As well as his superheroics, Barry tries to maintain a private life, and tries to keep his superhero identity from his colleagues, his boss Lt. Garfield, and his best friend, Julio Mendez.

== Cast and characters ==
=== Main ===
- John Wesley Shipp as Barry Allen / Flash: A forensic scientist in the Central City Police Department (CCPD) who gains the power of super speed after his lab is struck by lightning causing him to be doused with chemicals. Shipp also portrays the Flash's clone, Pollux.
- Amanda Pays as Tina McGee: A scientist at S.T.A.R. Labs who provides the Flash with experimental inventions to adapt and overcome his enemies and learn about his powers. She is also a love interest of Barry.
- Alex Désert as Julio Mendez: A Central City Police Department scientist who is Barry Allen's co-worker and close friend.

=== Recurring ===
- Richard Belzer as Joe Kline: A WCCN TV news reporter, known as the "Voice of the City", Kline often does tabloid-style news stories about the Flash and his exploits.
- Jason Bernard as Dr. Desmond Powell / Nightshade:
  A 1950s vigilante who captured criminals using tranquilizer darts. Desmond gave up being a vigilante after he stopped The Ghost in 1955; later he became a Doctor and Chief of Staff at Central City Hospital. When the Ghost reappears in 1990, Powell becomes Nightshade once again and teams up with the Flash to apprehend the Ghost. Later, he unknowingly inspires the Deadly Nightshade. He later reveals his secret identity and becomes a celebrity.
- Vito D'Ambrosio as Officer Tony Bellows: A CCPD patrol officer, partner of Murphy; in the early episodes, Bellows notices whenever the Flash appears, Murphy is never around. Bellows accuses Murphy of being the Flash, until he sees Murphy and the Flash at the same time.
- Biff Manard as Officer Michael Francis Murphy: A CCPD patrol officer and partner of Bellows, he does not believe the Flash is real because he has never witnessed the Flash (until he saw the Flash save hostages trapped inside a frozen bus, courtesy of Captain Cold). Murphy has served the CCPD for many years and is considering retiring to a job where he does not get shot at all the time.
- Mike Genovese as Lt. Warren Garfield: A Lieutenant in CCPD and Barry and Julio's supervisor. Despite his gruff demeanor, Garfield actually cares for his men. Garfield deduced the true identity of the Nightshade, Desmond Powell, who has been a friend of Garfield for more than 30 years.
- Mark Hamill as James Montgomery Jesse / The Trickster:
  A psychopath and delusional mass murderer with multiple personalities, and a con artist. Wanted for murder in six states, he is obsessed with Megan Lockhart and kidnaps her to be his fantasy sidekick, Prank. Believing that Megan is under the influence of the Flash, the Trickster challenges him to be rid of his "evil spell", but the Trickster fails and is arrested. He is put on trial & awaiting his verdict, when he is freed by Zoey Clark, who becomes the second Prank. As revenge, the Trickster captures the Flash and brainwashes him to do his bidding. The Trickster wreaks havoc upon Central City and puts the entire city on trial with the aid of his new partner. The Flash overcomes his programming and turns the tables on the Trickster, who is sent to a padded cell.
- Joyce Hyser as Megan Lockhart / Prank (1st): A private investigator and repossession agent, she deduced the Flash's Identity for a corrupt D.A., who would later blackmail the Flash. Opposed to what the Flash was working for until she witnessed him save someone she was spying on, and helped to put an end to the scheme of the corrupt D.A. She later becomes the Trickster's unwilling sidekick, Prank. Later she helps Tina McGee stop the Trickster (fed up with the Trickster's antics, Megan punches and knocks out the Trickster) and the brainwashed Flash. She also becomes one of Barry Allen's love interests.
- M. Emmet Walsh as Henry Allen: A sergeant, retired CCPD and father of Barry and Jay Allen. Henry inspired his sons to join the police force, though his relationship with Barry is partially estranged. Henry is also a supporter of the Flash.
- Dick Miller as Fosnight: A police informant who provides Barry Allen with tips on criminals. Fosnight owes a "life debt" to Henry Allen, and extended that debt to his two sons as well. He was originally arrested by the first Nightshade and is the first person to believe his innocence.
- Priscilla Pointer as Nora Allen: The mother of Barry and Jay Allen, she is a volunteer at a shelter for single mothers.
- Gloria Reuben as Sabrina: Julio's girlfriend, she is constantly trying to set up Barry with blind dates, and constantly breaking up and getting back together with Julio.
- Robert Shayne as Reg the News Stand Vendor: Reg was the owner of a news stand whom Barry Allen buys his daily newspaper from. He also offers Barry occasional advice and information on underworld activities.
- Michael Nader as Nicholas Pike: A disgraced former CCPD patrol officer who became the leader of the Dark Riders biker gang; in revenge, Pike murders Barry Allen's brother Jay Allen, who was once Pike's partner and the person who turned Pike in for corruption. Pike is captured by the Flash and put on trial, but is released on a technicality. Pike tries to kill the Flash, but his plan backfires and Pike is arrested again. In an alternate future timeline, Pike becomes the fascist Mayor of Central City, but is again defeated by the Flash before the hero returns to the present to avert Pike's younger counterpart's attempt for power.

=== Guest stars ===
- Corinne Bohrer as Zoey Clark / Prank (2nd): The owner of Clarx Toys and a huge fan of the Trickster, her obsession leads her to free him during his trial. Originally, the Trickster intends to recreate his criminal life but Zoey seduces him back to his Trickster self and becomes the Trickster's true sidekick, Prank, which is what she always wanted. Prank uses her wealth to finance the Trickster's evil schemes, including the brainwashing of the Flash. The corrupted Flash becomes the Trickster's favored sidekick and she is locked and tied up in her own toy store for complaining about it. Despite her best efforts, the Trickster has lost interest in Prank and ultimately boots her out of the getaway truck that they are in, resulting in Prank's arrest.
- Richard Burgi as Curtis Bohannan / Deadly Nightshade: A philanthropist and son of mob boss Derek Bohannan, an enemy of Nightshade, he decides to atone for his father's sins by becoming a vigilante resembling Nightshade, except the Deadly Nightshade wears red-glowing goggles and uses real bullets. The Deadly Nightshade guns down a terrorist group and several of Derek Bohannan's former mob associates before the Flash confronts him. Due to their similar appearances, the real Nightshade is framed for the murders. Using his wealth, Bohannan builds a high-tech lair inside his mansion and an advanced cybernetic exoskeleton, which gives Bohannan super-speed similar to the Flash. The Flash then attempts to apprehend him, but is nearly overwhelmed by the exoskeleton and an injury he sustained earlier in the leg, but then it is Bohannan who is then tranquilized by the original Nightshade and arrested by the police.
- David Cassidy as Sam Scudder / Mirror Master: A professional thief who is an expert with mirrors and holography, he steals a crystal from S.T.A.R. Labs and attempts to kill his ex-partner Stasia Masters, a high school girlfriend of Barry Allen. The Flash (with help from Tina) uses a high-powered spotlight to blind Scudder and drown out his illusions, allowing the Flash to capture him.
- Michael Champion as Leonard Wynters / Captain Cold: An infamous albino hitman known for freezing his victims to death with a nuclear-powered freeze gun. Cold is captured by the Flash and arrested by CCPD pending trial, but later escapes using concealed freeze weapons. He is seemingly killed by his own freeze ray when the Flash deflects the ray back at him.
- Jeffrey Combs as Jimmy Swain: A mob boss who hires Captain Cold to eliminate his enemies, including the Flash. Since Captain Cold initially failed to kill the Flash, Swain refuses to pay Cold, who kills Swain with a freeze bomb and takes his fee out of a twisted sense of honor.
- Denise Crosby as Dr. Rebecca Frost: A psychologist specializing in psychoanalyzing masked vigilantes such as the Flash, assigned to be Felicia Kane's psychiatrist after the Deadly Nightshade rescued her. She went out on one date with Barry Allen.
- Paula Marshall as Iris West:
  A computer graphics artist who is dating Barry Allen at the time he is transformed into the Flash without her knowledge. Barry wants to marry Iris, but she refuses, feeling that their relationship is moving too fast, and they break up. Iris later moves to Paris to make a new start in her life. She sends a postcard to Barry in the second episode, but Barry's interest subsided, so Julio burns it to help Barry move on with his life. Even though Barry puts Iris behind him, he still keeps a family picture with her in it that they took during his brother's birthday party. Marshall was credited as a principal character for the pilot episode, but was subsequently written out of the show with the second episode.
- Bill Mumy as Roger Braintree: An eccentric but brilliant scientist who creates a sound wave device capable of putting its targets into a deep slumber. Braintree's cousin, small-time hoodlum Harry Milgrim, steals the device and uses it in a crime spree until he is caught by the Flash.
- Christopher Neame as Dr. Brian Gideon: Former S.T.A.R. Labs scientist with a grudge towards the company after an accidental gas killed hundreds. Months later, Gideon, using an invisibility belt, sought to poison Central City but was stopped by Flash short-circuiting out his device, killing him.
- Lois Nettleton as Belle Crocker / The Ghostess: The Ghost's sidekick and girlfriend, she is saved by the Nightshade after their hideout catches on fire. Thinking the Ghost has died, she gives up the life of crime and becomes a lounge singer. Thirty-five years later, she learns that the Ghost survived the fire and has not aged. While she initially welcomes him back into her life, she cannot handle the fact that he is still a young man and eventually leaves him, informing Nightshade of the Ghost's location.

- Sherrie Rose as young Belle Crocker

- Jeri Ryan as Felicia Kane: A wealthy heiress who is kidnapped and held for ransom by pro-Guevara Marxist revolutionaries. She is rescued by the Deadly Nightshade, who ruthlessly guns down Kane's kidnappers, then freed by the Flash. Severely traumatized by her ordeal, Kane's testimony clears the wrongly accused Flash of any wrongdoing, but puts the original Nightshade inadvertently in the wrong light.
- Anthony Starke as Russell / The Ghost: A megalomaniacal extortionist and electronics expert who uses television to eavesdrop on his victims and broadcast his demands. In 1955, Nightshade attempts to capture the Ghost, who threatened to blow up downtown Central City if he was not paid $1 million by the Mayor, but the Ghost fakes his death and seals himself in a "freeze chamber", set to awaken the Ghost in 1999. The equipment malfunctions and thaws out the Ghost in 1990; the Ghost and his crew steal electronics from a TV charity telethon and S.T.A.R. Labs, then the Ghost connects himself to his computers & threatens to shut down Central City's computer network, communications and power grid if he is not paid a $1 billion ransom, but he is captured by the Flash and Nightshade. The Ghost's mind is trapped in cyberspace, with his body left in a catatonic state.
- Tim Thomerson as Jay Allen: The older brother of Barry Allen and head of the CCPD Motorcycle Patrol Division, he is killed by his former police partner, Nicholas Pike. His first name is a nod to Jay Garrick.
- Mariko Tse as Linda Park: A Central City news reporter, asking the Central City police department about their response in dealing with all the gang attacks in the city.
- Christopher Neame as Marcos Trachmann: Trachmann is a former mind control researcher working for drug lord Reuben Calderon, who sought to control Flash to distract away from crimes. He is later immobilized by Flash hotwiring out his equipment and placed in police custody.

Other guest stars in minor roles include Jonathan Brandis as Terry Cohan, Bryan Cranston as Phillip Moses, Mark Dacascos as Osako, Robert O'Reilly as Victor Kelso, and Sven-Ole Thorsen as the android assassin Omega. Thorsen also portrayed Carl Tanner in his monster form.

== Production ==
Development for the series began in 1988 when Warner Bros. Television tried to develop television films based on some DC Comics characters for CBS. Danny Bilson and Paul De Meo conceived one titled Unlimited Powers that featured several superheroes, including the Flash, forming a resistance in a dystopian future where superheroes had been outlawed, taking cues from contemporary comics such as Watchmen and The Dark Knight Returns. That project was not made, though from it, in January 1990, new CBS Entertainment president Jeff Sagansky expressed interest in creating a series featuring the Flash, and The Flash was announced a few months after.

Bilson and De Meo were tapped to write the pilot episode, which they completed in January 1990. Filming for the episode took six weeks, from May through June 1990. The final effects for the pilot were completed a week before airing in September 1990. Bilson said that 125 special effects were done on "a grand scale". The 2-hour pilot cost $6 million, and each subsequent episode of The Flash cost around $1.6 million to produce.

=== Costumes ===
The four Flash suits made for the series for John Wesley Shipp cost a total of $100,000. On the suit, De Meo said: "John had to have his entire body cast. The suit is made out of latex. It was quite a process getting it." Bilson added: "The suit was critical. You can't, after Batman, have a guy running around in tights." The Flash's costume was designed by Dave Stevens, who removed the yellow boots, muted the redness, changed the yellow trim to gold and added refined art deco bolts on the temples. Robert Short was tasked with supervising its fabrication and they were built by Stan Winston Studios. Short said the latex suits were specially treated to disguise their rubber surface so they would look like basic stretch unitards, and Shipp wore a water-cooled undergarment to combat the heat of the suits. Bob Miller, costumer on the series, gave Amanda Pays "unaggressive clothing" though she is "an aggressive career woman," with retro 1930s and '40s long tapered skirts, pleated slacks and vests.

=== Music ===
Danny Elfman composed the series' title theme, and Shirley Walker composed each episode score for a full orchestra. In 2010, a limited-edition two-disc soundtrack was released by La-La Land Records, featuring Elfman's theme and the scores by Walker for the pilot and the episodes "Captain Cold", "The Trickster", "Watching the Detectives", "Ghost in the Machine", "Done With Mirrors", "Fast Forward" and "Trial of the Trickster".

== Episodes ==
The Flash episodes
No.	Title	Directed by	Written by	Original release date	Prod. code	U.S. viewers (millions)
1	"Pilot"	Robert Iscove	Danny Bilson & Paul De Meo	September 20, 1990	187100	22.2
Forensic scientist Barry Allen is struck by lightning and doused in chemical products that afford him superhuman speed, which he learns to control with help from Tina McGee, a scientist from S.T.A.R. Labs. When Barry's brother, policeman Jay Allen, is murdered by his corrupt ex-partner, Nicholas Pike, the leader of a vicious motorcycle gang of criminals, Barry uses his newfound abilities to bring Pike and his gang to justice and decides to continue protecting Central City as "The Flash".
2	"Out of Control"	Mario Azzopardi	Gail Morgan Hickman	September 27, 1990	187102	18.4
While Barry and his colleague Julio Mendez investigate the murders of several homeless people whose bodies are being stolen from the crime scenes, Tina reconnects with an old friend, Dr. Carl Tanner, who has recently returned to Central City to retrieve Tina's late husband's research on genetic engineering. Barry and Tina learn that Tanner is using the vagrants in his lethal illegal experiments to create mutations, and upon being confronted, Tanner injects himself with the unfinished serum, turning into a man monster that only the Flash manages to defeat.
3	"Watching the Detectives"	Gus Trikonis	Howard Chaykin & John Francis Moore	October 18, 1990	187103	14.9
Barry's secret identity is uncovered by Megan Lockhart, a private investigator employed by corrupt District Attorney Thomas Castillo, whose collaborator, mobster Arthur Simonson, has hired an arsonist to torch buildings in the waterfront area as part of Castillo's efforts to bring legalized gambling into Central City on behalf of the organized crime. Castillo blackmails Barry into becoming his secret accomplice, enabling Barry to acquire evidence of Castillo's crimes, including his plans to control the mob bosses and seize control of their business. Upon learning of this, Simonson rigs a bomb in Castillo's car and Castillo is subsequently assassinated when he turns the ignition. Lockhart, having grown attracted to Barry, surrenders the evidence to Barry she had compiled in order to protect his secret.
4	"Honor Among Thieves"	Aaron Lipstadt	S : Howard Chaykin & John Francis Moore; T : Milo Bachman, Danny Bilson & Paul De Meo	October 25, 1990	187101	17.4
Master thief Stan Kovacs assembles a team of professional thieves, who the police believe intend to steal the Mask of Rasputin from the museum of natural history. While they are distracted guarding it, Kovacs masterminds a string of robberies across Central City, which are foiled by the Flash, and in the process Barry learns that Kovacs is using the other criminals as a diversion so his accomplice Celia Wayne can steal the relic from the museum's curator and Barry's mentor, Ted Preminger. The Flash catches up to Kovacs and Celia before they escape with the artifact and brings them to justice, insuring that Preminger can finance the museum with the Rasputin Mask exhibit.
5	"Double Vision"	Gus Trikonis	Jim Trombetta	November 1, 1990	187105	12.5
Barry attempts to foil the kidnapping of Paloma Aguilar, daughter of DEA agent Peter Paul Aguilar, who is scheduled to testify against drug lord Reuben Calderon. However, Calderon's enforcer, Marcos Trachman, utilizes a potentially fatal advanced microscopic device to control Barry's nervous system and force him to help them kidnap Paloma before Tina manages to jam the devices' signal. Barry and Tina then race against time to prevent a brainwashed Paloma from murdering her father while under Trachman's control, and once he's defeated, he agrees to testify against Calderon, leading to Calderon's conviction. Trachman suffers a "short circuit" after a fight with The Flash.
6	"Sins of the Father"	Jonathan Sanger	Stephen Hattman	November 8, 1990	187104	13.9
Barry attempts to protect his father, veteran policeman Henry Allen, from Johnny Ray Hix, a dangerous criminal that Henry arrested 15 years prior and who has escaped from prison to enact revenge. Henry is initially dismissive of Barry's attempts to use forensic science, which Henry rejects, to locate Hix, but they prove vital when Hix murders Henry's old partner Pete Donello and hires a hitman who nearly kills Henry. The Flash rescues him and brings Hix to justice, while Barry and Henry finally make amends.
7	"Child's Play"	Danny Bilson	S : Stephen Hattman & Gail Morgan Hickman; T : Howard Chaykin & John Francis Moore	November 15, 1990	187106	14.9
Barry shelters street orphans Terry and Cory Cohan, who have stolen the knapsack of a recently murdered journalist, Philip Sullivan, containing Sullivan's research on a highly addictive synthetic drug known as "Blue Paradise" on a floppy disk, developed by notorious drug designer Beauregarde Lesko. Terry is nearly turned into an addict while meeting Lesko to exchange the disk for $1 million, and Barry subsequently defeats Lesko and dismantles his operation before Blue Paradise can be unleashed in Central City, while Terry and Cory are adopted by Sullivan's widow, Joan.
8	"Shroud of Death"	Mario Azzopardi	S : Howard Chaykin & John Francis Moore; T : Michael Reaves	November 29, 1990	187107	16.3
Lieutenant Warren Garfield stonewalls Barry and Julio's efforts to locate a cloaked figure who is targeting individuals connected to the arrest and conviction of notorious anarchist Jefferson Zacharias, who was executed after having been given the death penalty. Barry realizes Garfield was the arresting officer just as Garfield's fiancée, Mavis, is critically injured by the killer, revealed to be Zacharias' daughter, Angel, who then lures Garfield into a trap. The Flash intervenes, saves Garfield's fiancée and then prevents Garfield from killing her in revenge. Garfield then marries Mavis.
9	"Ghost in the Machine"	Bruce Bilson	John Francis Moore & Howard Chaykin	December 13, 1990	187108	13.0
In 1955, Central City's guardian was Desmond Powell, who fought crime as "The Nightshade". His last nemesis, a criminal mastermind known as "The Ghost", is believed to have died after a confrontation, causing a guilt-stricken Powell to retire. The Ghost however has in fact preserved himself in cryogenic suspended animation and resurfaces in 1990, where he hijacks Central City's power grids and holds the city for ransom, forcing Powell to return to action and join forces with the Flash. Together, they defeat the Ghost, who had wired himself into the city's electrical network, and save the city.
10	"Sight Unseen"	Christopher Leitch	T : Gail Morgan Hickman; S/T : John Vorhaus	January 10, 1991	187109	13.0
Brian Gideon, a disturbed chemical engineer, learns that S.T.A.R. Labs is producing nerve toxins based on his research for the United States government and uses a stealth device to infiltrate S.T.A.R. Labs and retrieve the toxins. His plan traps Tina and her employer Ruth Wenerke in the lab, where they are exposed to a deadly neurotoxin. While attempting to locate both Gideon and a cure, Barry clashes with federal agent Jack Quinn, who is trying to cover up his own involvement in the emergency. Barry confronts Gideon, who injects him with the toxin in order to escape, but Barry is able to burn it out of his body, and use his blood to inoculate Tina and Ruth. Gideon is then arrested, while Ruth cuts ties with Quinn, who is suspended when the activities he illegally sanctioned for Gideon are exposed.
11	"Beat the Clock"	Mario Azzopardi	Jim Trombetta	January 31, 1991	187111	12.1
Barry and Julio are tipped off that Wayne Cotrell, a famous Jazz saxophonist on the death row for the murder of his wife, lounge singer Linda Lake, is innocent, and they have less than an hour to find evidence to acquit him. They ultimately learn that Linda was kidnapped by Wayne's brother, Elliott Cotrell, who wanted to ruin his brother's life out of jealousy, and that his enforcer, an ex-warlord and singer nicknamed "Whisper", murdered another woman, who was then put in Linda's place in a fixed car accident designed to lead back to Wayne. After incapacitating Whisper, Barry carries Linda to the execution chamber. They arrive in the nick of time to save Wayne before the execution is carried out. Wayne is reunited with Linda, while Elliott is arrested.
12	"The Trickster"	Danny Bilson	Howard Chaykin & John Francis Moore	February 7, 1991	187112	11.5
James Jesse, a serial killer with multiple personalities, becomes obsessed with Megan Lockhart, who had been investigating his activities, and attempts to kidnap her, but she is rescued by the Flash. Believing them to be romantically involved, Jesse adopts the identity of the Trickster and begins tormenting the Flash and terrorizing the city. The Flash ultimately lures Jesse into a fight at the police's costume ball, where he is finally caught and arrested. Despite Barry and Megan becoming previously involved, she decides to leave Central City and ends their relationship.
13	"Tina, Is That You?"	William A. Fraker	T : Chad Hayes & Carey Hayes; S/T : David L. Newman	February 14, 1991	187110	12.1
Barry becomes plagued with nightmares and cannot sleep normally due to his double life as The Flash. In an attempt to help Barry sleep again, a bio-feedback experiment gone awry causes Tina to develop a malevolent personality, and after the accidental death of the leader of an all-female gang, called the Black Rose, she seizes control of the gang. When Barry foils their latest robbery, Tina decides to lure Barry into a trap and kill him and a blind date he was with, but Barry manages to escape, preventing Tina from leaving town with the gang and leaving the Black Rose and a tattoo parlor owner known as "Big Ed", who was hiding them, for the police. Barry takes Tina back to S.T.A.R. Labs, and uses the bio-feedback device to restore her to normal.
14	"Be My Baby"	Bruce Bilson	Jule Selbo	February 21, 1991	187113	14.7
Barry crosses paths with Stacy Doubek, the daughter of Nobel prize winning academics, and her young daughter, Lily, who are fleeing Lily's father, mobster Philip Moses (Bryan Cranston), who wants the child as his heir. After the Flash prevents Moses from kidnapping Lily, Garfield attempts to use her in a sting operation to lure Moses into a trap, but Moses is tipped off by a man in the police force and manages to escape with Lily. The Flash chases him to an abandoned airfield and prevents him from leaving Central City, and Moses is arrested while Stacy and Lily are reunited and decide to stay in Central City.
15	"Fast Forward"	Gus Trikonis	Gail Morgan Hickman	February 27, 1991	187114	14.3
Nicholas Pike is released from prison on a technicality and attempts to use a missile to kill the Flash, instead transporting him 10 years into the future to the year 2001, where Barry's secret identity has been exposed and Pike has conquered the now dystopian city. Aided by his old friends, Barry regains his speed and manages to return to the past, capturing Pike once again and saving the city.
16	"Deadly Nightshade"	Bruce Bilson	John Francis Moore & Howard Chaykin	March 30, 1991	187116	11.8
Philanthropist Curtis Bohannan, son of Derek Bohannan, a mobster fought by the Nightshade in the 1950s, becomes a copycat vigilante known as "The Deadly Nightshade", who employs lethal force in his crusade against crime. Garfield is sent evidence that Powell, an old friend of his, is the Nightshade and arrests him, only for Powell to be kidnapped by Bohannan, who wants Powell to join him. Barry locates them and Powell saves Barry from Bohannan who is armed with an accelerated Exo-Skeleton suit. Powell then decides to reveal his secret identity to the world.
17	"Captain Cold"	Gilbert Shilton	S : Paul De Meo; S/T : Gail Morgan Hickman	April 6, 1991	187117	10.6
Mobster Jimmy Swain employs hitman Leonard Wynters, also known as "Captain Cold" for his weapon of choice, a nuclear-powered freeze ray, to eliminate his competitors and then the Flash. Barry's investigation is hampered by Terri Kronenberg, a tabloid reporter for the National Inquisitor. After killing Swain for firing him after his failure to kill The Flash in the first attempt, Wynters nearly kills Barry after Kronenberg gets in the middle of them during a confrontation. Wynters is caught by The Flash after he attempts to kill her in her apartment. Wynters later escapes prison and lures the Flash into a trap, hellbent on completing his contract out of honor, but Barry outsmarts him due to a device that preserves his body heat, and diverts Wynters' beam against him, encasing Wynters in ice.
18	"Twin Streaks"	James A. Contner	Stephen Hattman	April 13, 1991	187115	10.8
Barry is cloned by Dr. Jason Brassel, who names the clone "Pollux", who Brassel designs a blue variant suit for. Upon learning that he is a clone and not a real person, Pollux goes on a rampage. He comes into conflict with the Flash, who is currently suffering symptoms of stress and fatigue. Brassel attempts to kill Barry after Pollux throws a bullet into him, but Pollux takes the bullet and dies in Barry's arms. Brassel succumbs from the injuries Pollux had earlier inflicted on him.
19	"Done with Mirrors"	Danny Bilson	Howard Chaykin & John Francis Moore	April 27, 1991	187118	9.5
Sam Scudder, a criminal mastermind who uses mirrors and holograms to commit his crimes, steals an advanced battery from S.T.A.R Labs Silicon Valley division. The battery is then stolen from him by his partner, Anastasia Masters, who flees to Central City and seduces her former classmate Barry into sheltering her at his apartment. Scudder kidnaps both Barry and Tina's mother Jocelyn Weller, whom he mistakes for Stasia's buyer, to force Stasia to deliver the battery. Barry ultimately realizes Stasia is manipulating him. He rescues Tina, who had been lured to the station where Stasia was trying to sell the battery, pummels Scudder and arrests Stasia. He then returns the battery to S.T.A.R Labs.
20	"Good Night, Central City"	Mario Azzopardi	Jim Trombetta	May 4, 1991	187119	8.4
Petty crook Harry Milgrim and his cousin, scientist Roger Braintree, plan to use a soundwave device developed by Braintree, which places people in an induced slumber, to rob Central City. Milgrim fakes his death during a test run, then pins the blame for a robbery on Barry. The Flash races against time to both prove his innocence and prevent Milgrim, Braintree and a group of professional gangsters from conducting a citywide robbery after discovering the induced sleep is fatal if the sleepers sleep too long. In the end, Barry triumphs, with Milgrim, who had killed Braintree, is arrested, clearing his name, and humiliating an over eager internal affairs agent.
21	"Alpha"	Bruce Bilson	S : Denise Skinner; S/T : Gail Morgan Hickman	May 11, 1991	187120	10.4
Barry and Tina befriend Alpha, an android assassin developed by the NSIA (a United States government division) who refuses to kill, and protect her from another android assassin, Omega, sent to retrieve her. The Flash ultimately destroys Omega. He then helps Alpha evade the NSIA and escape Central City before a bomb inside her goes off. Later, she leaves to start her life anew.
22	"The Trial of the Trickster"	Danny Bilson	Howard Chaykin & John Francis Moore	May 18, 1991	187121	11.4
James Jesse is brought to trial for his previous rampage in Central City. Jesse later escapes from the courtroom with help from an obsessive fan, Zoey Clark. He becomes the Trickster once again, with Clark as his assistant, Prank. They brainwash the Flash into joining them in wreaking havoc, damaging the Flash's public image. Jesse ultimately betrays Clark and leaves her to the police. Tina and Megan join forces and manage to break Barry free in time to prevent Jesse from executing the lawyers and the judge involved in his trial. Jesse is then captured and put into a padded cell, while the Flash is embraced as a hero by the people of Central City. Barry turns down an offer to move to San Francisco with Megan because he is not ready to say goodbye to Central City.

== Release ==
=== Broadcast ===
The Flash was originally scheduled to debut on CBS in the 8 pm (EST) slot on Thursday, to go against The Cosby Show on NBC, in an attempt to attract younger viewers, before Fox moved The Simpsons from Sunday to the Thursday 8 pm slot for the same reason. After debuting on September 20, 1990, at 8 pm, CBS moved the series to 8:30 pm with its second episode, in an attempt to broadcast opposite less formidable competition in Fox's Babes, NBC's A Different World and the second half-hour of ABC's Father Dowling Mysteries. The move was done because this was part of CBS' programming realignment that also involves placing Lenny on hiatus, the delay of Sons and Daughters, and the cancellation of another sci-fi show E.A.R.T.H. Force. Eventually, CBS moved the series off Thursdays entirely, moving the show to Saturday nights. Had the show continued, it was revealed the second season would have opened with the Flash's rogues teaming up to take down the hero.

=== Marketing ===
Warner Bros. Television and CBS began its promotion of the series in July 1990 during the 1990 NBA All-Star Game. It also had ad campaigns on radio and cable television during "wrestling matches on USA Cable and during [Batman airings] on the Family Channel", as well as ads in The Flash comic book and posters for the series in malls and Kmarts across the country. Four-minute promos of the series aired at all Six Flags amusement parks and a few weeks before the pilot's debut, Warner Bros. flew banners over beaches on both coasts. Describing the marketing, George Schweitzer, senior vice president of communications at the CBS Broadcast Group said: "It's not being sold as a comic book. It's being sold like Batman [the 1989 film] – dark and mysterious and exciting. The promos have a theatrical quality". The pilot debuted on July 15, 1990, at a "big bash" at the Warner Bros. Burbank lot.

=== Home media ===
Some episodes of the series were edited into feature-length films and released on VHS: The Flash, consisting of the 2-hour pilot episode; The Flash II: Revenge of the Trickster, consisting of the episodes "The Trickster" and "The Trial of the Trickster"; and The Flash III: Deadly Nightshade (1991), consisting of the episodes "Ghost in the Machine" and "The Deadly Nightshade" (this third feature-length film was only released in Region 2 PAL areas). An extended version of the pilot episode was released on laser-disc.

The first ever DVD release of the show was the second episode, "Out of Control", which was released as a bonus disc under the Warner Bros. Television Commemorative DVD Volume 9: The Flash, part of a promotional DVD series designed to promote 50 years of Warner Bros. Television and to promote other TV shows that were not yet released on DVD. It was included with the DVD release of the fourth season set of Smallville in 2005 in North America. The entire series was released on DVD in January 2006.

The series was released on Blu-ray in June 2024 and features brand new 1080p HD masters, created from 4K scans of the original camera negatives.

== Arrowverse ==
The 2014 television series, The Flash, features several references to the 1990 series. John Wesley Shipp plays the recurring role of Barry Allen's father, Henry Allen, and Amanda Pays once again portrays a character named Dr. Tina McGee. Shipp eventually portrays the Earth-3 version of Henry Allen, Jay Garrick / Flash. Regarding the difference in his portrayal of Garrick over Allen, Shipp "figured Jay is my version of Barry" from the 1990 series, adding: "I went back and I watched a couple of episodes of the 1990/91 version to kind of remind myself what I did. [Jay] is much more reminiscent of my Barry Allen from 25 years ago than my Henry Allen. I went back and I was amazed how much attitude my Barry Allen had in some situations. I went back and I picked up that thread and I brought it forward 25 years, and tried to weave it in". In "Welcome to Earth-2", as Barry, Cisco Ramon and Harry Wells are traveling to Earth-2, glimpses of the multiverse are seen, including an image of Shipp as the Flash from the 1990 series, implying that the series was retroactively being added to the Arrowverse-multiverse.

In the episode "Tricksters", Mark Hamill returns as James Jesse / Trickster, with images of Hamill as Trickster from the 1990 TV series being used in a police report, and Vito D'Ambrosio plays Mayor Anthony Bellows; a variation of a police officer character he played in 1991, though a later episode revealed Mayor Bellows was formerly an officer. 2014 series composer Blake Neely incorporated Walker's theme for the Trickster into the episode. Alex Désert reprises the role of Julio Mendez in the series' third-season episode, "Flashpoint", where he is the captain of the Central City Police Department in the Flashpoint timeline. Corinne Bohrer reprises her role as Zoey Clark / Prank in the fourth season episode, "The Elongated Knight Rises", which also featured stills of her from the 1990 show in her police file.

Shipp reprises his role as Barry Allen from this series in the 2018 Arrowverse crossover, "Elseworlds". The crossover also links the 1990 series to the Arrowverse, designating its world as Earth-90. Danny Elfman's theme accompanied the Earth-90 Flash's appearance into the episodes. He attempts to warn the heroes of Earth-1 about Mar Novu / The Monitor to prevent a similar devastation that his own world suffered before Novu breaches him away. The character returned in the following year's crossover, "Crisis on Infinite Earths", having been captured by the Anti-Monitor and forced to power his anti-matter cannon to destroy the multiverse. Despite being freed by Earth-1 Flash and his allies, he ultimately sacrifices himself to destroy the machine, seeing his life with Tina (whom he had married at some point) flash before his eyes in the form of a clip from the original series' pilot episode. After the filming of the scene, Shipp told The Flash showrunner Eric Wallace: "Thank you for giving me this opportunity to close a chapter".
