= DC Comics Deck-building Game =

DC Comics Deck-building Game is a 2012 card game published by Cryptozoic Entertainment.

== Gameplay ==
DC Comics Deck-building Game is a game in which players build and refine their own superhero decks, using powers, equipment, and defenses to defeat an escalating lineup of super‑villains in a race to score the most victory points as the Justice League.

== Reviews ==
- Black Gate
- Rebel Times #74
