= 1955 in British television =

This is a list of British television related events from 1955.

== Events ==
=== January ===
- January – First televised Welsh language play Cap Wil Tomos.
- 2 January – Annette Mills, host of Muffin the Mule, makes her last appearance on television.
- 10 January – Annette Mills dies from a heart attack after an operation. Following her death, Muffin the Mule is dropped by the BBC Television Service for 50 years.
- 15 January
  - Sketch comedy The Benny Hill Show premieres on the BBC Television Service, later moving to ITV. Its global audience figures will be counted in the billions.
  - The BBC broadcasts Heinz Sielmann's pioneering nature documentary Zimmerleute des Waldes as Woodpecker at the behest of David Attenborough and presented by Peter Scott; it is repeated several times during the year.
- 16 January – Glove puppet bear Sooty gets his own TV series hosted by Harry Corbett. It is transmitted fortnightly for the first seven years alternating with other children's programmes.

=== February ===
- 18 February – Model Sabrina first appears in Arthur Askey's Before Your Very Eyes on BBC Television.

=== April ===
- 8 April – The BBC broadcasts Billy Graham's All Scotland Crusade live from the Kelvin Hall in Glasgow. This has the second highest audience share at this time, after the Coronation.

=== May ===
- 4 May – A consortium of the initial four Independent Television broadcasting companies establishes ITN, which will provide ITV with its news service when it launches in September.
- 17 May – Sir Anthony Eden hosts a ground-breaking television election programme for the Conservative Party, the first broadcast of its type. The 30 minute programme features government ministers pitted against newspaper editors.
- 26–27 May – The BBC provides around 17 hours of results coverage of the 1955 United Kingdom general election. The BBC records the coverage for the first time but only around three hours still exists in the BBC archives.

=== June ===
- 29 June – Life with the Lyons, one of the first successful British sitcoms (starring British-domiciled American couple Ben Lyon and Bebe Daniels), premieres on the BBC Television Service, having previously been broadcast only on radio. It will later transfer to ITV.

=== July ===
- 9 July – Police procedural Dixon of Dock Green, created by Ted Willis, premieres on the BBC Television Service, featuring Jack Warner as Police Constable George Dixon, an old-style "bobby" on the beat in east London.
- 21 July – The BBC brings into service its Divis transmitting station, its first permanent 405-line VHF Band I facility serving Northern Ireland, marking the launch of a television service for Northern Ireland; the 35 kW transmissions can also be readily received in much of the Republic of Ireland.
- 29 July – Panel show This Is Your Life premieres on the BBC Television Service.

=== September ===
- 2 September – Under the guidance of Dr. Humphry Osmond, his friend Christopher Mayhew MP ingests 400 mg of Mescaline hydrochloride and allows himself to be filmed as part of a Panorama special for BBC TV that is never broadcast.
- 4 September – Newsreaders appear "in vision" for the first time on BBC TV.
- 14 September – The highly popular and long-running live children's variety show Crackerjack is broadcast for the first time on BBC TV, hosted by Eamonn Andrews.
- 22 September – Commercial broadcasting starts in the UK with the launch of ITV in London, Associated-Rediffusion on weekdays and Associated Television Network (ATV) at weekends, from Croydon transmitting station. The rest of the UK receive their ITV regions over the next seven years. Leslie Mitchell is the first announcer to be heard; the first advertisement shown (at 8.12pm) is for Gibbs SR toothpaste (with voiceover by Alex Macintosh).
- 23 September – On ITV:
  - Associated-Rediffusion broadcasts the UK's first morning television programme, Morning Magazine.
  - Barbara Mandell becomes Britain's first female newsreader, presenting ITN's Midday News bulletin.
  - Game show Take Your Pick!, presented by Michael Miles, transfers to television. It is the first game show broadcast in the UK to offer cash prizes.
- 25 September – On ITV:
  - The internationally popular series The Adventures of Robin Hood is premiered by ATV London with Richard Greene in the title role. It has been devised by American-born executive producer Hannah Weinstein partly to enable the commissioning of scripts by Ring Lardner Jr. and other writers on the Hollywood blacklist.
  - ATV's variety show Sunday Night at the London Palladium launches; tonight's edition is compered by Tommy Trinder with Gracie Fields and Guy Mitchell featuring; the programme initially runs until 1967.
  - I Love Lucy is launched on UK television.

=== October ===
- 10 October – Alexandra Palace begins test transmissions of a 405-line colour television service.
- 22 October – Science fiction serial Quatermass II sequel to 1953's The Quatermass Experiment, premieres on the BBC Television Service. It ends on 26 November.

=== December ===
- 25 December – After being on radio since 1932, the Royal Christmas Message is broadcast on British television for the first time, in sound only at 3pm. The first visual Christmas message is shown in 1957.

=== Undated ===
- BICC constructs North Hessary Tor transmitting station for the BBC on Dartmoor to bring television coverage to Devon.

== New channels ==
| Date | Channel |
|---|---|
| 22 September | ITV (network rebrands in the next 46 years to become ITV1) |

== Debuts ==
=== BBC Television Service/BBC TV ===
- 8 January – Return to the Lost Planet (1955)
- 15 January – The Benny Hill Show (1955–1961; 1964; 1966–1968; 1969–1989)
- 16 January – The Sooty Show (1955–1967; 1968–1992)
- 14 February – Picture Book (1955–1965)
- 16 February
  - Portrait of Alison (1955)
  - Look at It This Way (1955)
- 22 February – Benbow and the Angels (1955)
- 5 April – The Children of the New Forest (1955)
- 16 April – The Mulberry Accelerator (1955)
- 17 May – Thunder Rock (1955)
- 21 May – The Ted Ray Show (1955–1959)
- 28 May – Terminus (1955)
- 3 June – Bath-Night with Braden (1955)
- 29 June – Life with the Lyons (1955–1960)
- 3 July – Holiday Hotel (1955)
- 5 July – The Gordon Honour (1955–1956)
- 9 July – Dixon of Dock Green (1955–1976)
- 15 July – Appointment with Drama (1955)
- 29 July – This Is Your Life (1955–1964, 1969–2003, 2007)
- 21 August – The Prince and the Pauper (1955)
- 9 September – The Woodentops (1955–1958)
- 10 September – As I Was Saying (1955)
- 14 September – Crackerjack (1955–1970, 1972–1984, 2020–2021)
- 2 October – The Blakes (1955)
- 4 October – Great Scott – It's Maynard! (1955–1956)
- 15 October – The Dave King Show (1955–1957)
- 22 October – Quatermass II (1955)
- 30 October – St. Ives (1955)
- 10 December – The Adventures of Annabel (1955–1956)
- 16 December – Here and Now (1955)
- 22 December – Vera Lynn Sings (1955–1959)
- Unknown
  - Kitchen Magic (presented by Fanny Cradock, 1955)
  - Sunday Night Theatre (1955–1959)
  - The Brains Trust (1955–1961)
  - Look (natural history series presented by Peter Scott, 1955–1981)
  - Studio E (1955–1958)
  - The Gardening Club (1955–1967)
  - It's Magic (1955–1958)

=== ITV ===
- 23 September
  - Sixpenny Corner (1955–1956)
  - Take Your Pick! (1955–1968, 1992–1999)
  - Dragnet (1951–1959)
- 24 September
  - Colonel March of Scotland Yard (1955–1956)
  - My Hero (1955–1956)
  - Strange Experiences (1955–1962)
  - The Jack Jackson Show (1955–1960)
- 25 September
  - I Love Lucy (1951–1957) (later The Lucy-Desi Show 1957–1960; The Lucy Show 1962–1967; Here's Lucy 1968–1974)
  - The Adventures of Noddy (1955–1956)
  - The Adventures of Robin Hood (1955–1959)
  - The Roy Rogers Show (1951–1957)
  - Sunday Night at the London Palladium (1955–1967, 1973–1974)
  - Theatre Royal (1955–1956)
- 26 September – Double Your Money (1955–1968)
- 27 September – ITV Play of the Week (1955–1974)
- 28 September – The Adventures of the Scarlet Pimpernel (1955–1956)
- 2 October – Joan and Leslie (1955–1958)
- 10 October – The Granville Melodramas (1955–1956)
- 15 October – On the Town (1955–1956)
- 4 November – Love and Kisses (1955)
- 5 December – Gun Law (1955–1975)
- 8 December – Lassie (1954–1974)
- Unknown
  - Mick and Montmorency (1955–1958)
  - Douglas Fairbanks Presents (1955–1959)
  - The Adventures of Rin Tin Tin (1954–1959)
  - Topper (1953–1955)

== Continuing television shows ==
=== 1920s ===
- BBC Wimbledon (1927–1939, 1946–2019, 2021–present)

=== 1930s ===
- Trooping the Colour (1937–1939, 1946–2019, 2023–present)
- The Boat Race (1938–1939, 1946–2019, 2021–present)
- BBC Cricket (1939, 1946–1999, 2020–2024)

=== 1940s ===
- Television Dancing Club (1948–1962; 1963–1964)
- The Ed Sullivan Show (1948–1971)
- Come Dancing (1949–1998)

=== 1950s ===
- Andy Pandy (1950–1970, 2002–2005)
- What's My Line? (1951–1963; 1973–1974; 1984–1990)
- Flower Pot Men (1952–1958, 2001–2002)
- Watch with Mother (1952–1975)
- The Appleyards (1952–1957)
- All Your Own (1952–1961)
- Billy Bunter of Greyfriars School (1952–1961)
- Animal, Vegetable, Mineral? (1952–1959)
- Before Your Very Eyes (1953–1956; 1956–1958)
- Asian Club (1953–1961)
- Rag, Tag and Bobtail (1953–1965)
- The Good Old Days (1953–1983)
- Panorama (1953–present)
- Fabian of the Yard (1954–1956)
- The Grove Family (1954–1957)
- Zoo Quest (1954–1963)
- Sportsview (1954–1968)
- Emney Enterprise (1954–1957)
- Carols from King's (1954–present)

== Ending this year ==
- Muffin the Mule (1946–1955, 2005–2006)
- Garrison Theatre (1953–1955)
- Face the Music (1953–1955)
- Walk in the Air (1954–1955)
- Stage by Stage (1954–1955)
- Fast and Loose (1954–1955)
- Show Case (1954–1955)

== Births ==
- 5 January – Jimmy Mulville, comedian and producer
- 6 January
  - Rowan Atkinson, comedy performer
  - Arthur Bostrom, actor
- 17 January – Gaby Rado, television journalist (died 2003)
- 3 February – Kirsty Wark, television presenter
- 8 February – Carol Harrison, actress and writer
- 18 March – Jeff Stelling, sports journalist and television presenter
- 29 March – Marina Sirtis, actress
- 5 April – Janice Long, née Chegwin, pop music presenter (died 2021)
- 23 April – Mike Smith, broadcaster and presenter (died 2014)
- 17 May – Nicola Heywood-Thomas, broadcaster and journalist (died 2023)
- 22 May – Dale Winton, broadcast presenter (died 2018)
- 7 June – Dean Sullivan, actor (died 2023)
- 14 June
  - Gillian Bailey, actor
  - Paul O'Grady, talk show host and comedy performer (died 2023)
- 23 June – Maggie Philbin, broadcast presenter
- 11 August – Ted Robbins, comedian, actor and DJ
- 14 August – Gillian Taylforth, actress
- 20 September – David Haig, actor
- 18 October – Timmy Mallett, television presenter
- 9 November – Karen Dotrice, actress
- 22 November – George Alagiah, BBC journalist and news presenter (died 2023)

== Deaths ==
- 10 January – Annette Mills, actress, dancer, singer-songwriter and children's television presenter (born 1894)

== See also ==
- 1955 in British music
- 1955 in the United Kingdom
- List of British films of 1955
