= 1955 in the United Kingdom =

Events from the year 1955 in the United Kingdom. The year is marked by changes of leadership for both principal political parties.

== Incumbents ==
- Monarch – Elizabeth II
- Prime Minister – Winston Churchill (Conservative) (until 6 April), Anthony Eden (Conservative) (starting 6 April)

== Events ==
- 1 January – The UK's first atomic bomber unit, No. 138 Squadron RAF, is formed, flying Vickers Valiant jets from RAF Gaydon in Warwickshire.
- 7 January – UK release of the Halas and Batchelor film animation of George Orwell's Animal Farm (completed April 1954), the first full-length British-made animated feature on general theatrical release, covertly funded by the CIA.
- 11 January – 1955 RAF Shackleton aircraft disappearance: Two Royal Air Force Avro Shackleton maritime patrol aircraft flying from RAF St Eval in Cornwall disappear without trace during a routine patrol.
- 23 January – Sutton Coldfield rail crash: a diverted express train takes a sharp curve too fast and derails at Sutton Coldfield railway station: 17 killed, 43 injured.
- 27 January – Michael Tippett's opera The Midsummer Marriage is premiered at the Royal Opera House, Covent Garden in London with designs by Barbara Hepworth and choreography by John Cranko; it arouses controversy.
- 24 February – A big freeze across Britain results in more than 70 roads being blocked with snow and in some parts of the country, rail services are cancelled for several days. The Royal Air Force works to deliver food and medical supplies to the worst affected areas.
- 25 February – Aircraft carrier HMS Ark Royal (launched 1950) commissioned, the first constructed with an angled flight deck and steam catapults from new.
- 1 April
  - The Central Electricity Authority takes over management and operation of the electricity supply industry in England and Wales from the British Electricity Authority.
  - EOKA starts a terrorist campaign against British rule in the Crown colony of Cyprus, leading to a state of emergency being declared by the Governor on 26 November.
- 2 April – Duncan Edwards, the 18-year-old Manchester United left-half, becomes the youngest full England international in a 7–2 win over Scotland at Wembley. Dudley-born Edwards is already being tipped by many observers to become the next England captain upon the eventual retirement of Billy Wright.
- 5 April – Winston Churchill resigns as Prime Minister due to ill-health at the age of 80.
- 6 April – Foreign Secretary Anthony Eden is named as the new Prime Minister. Eden, 58, has held government and shadow cabinet ministerial roles for the last 20 years and was first tipped for the role of Prime Minister as long ago as Stanley Baldwin's resignation. Eden's previous office of Deputy Prime Minister is not refilled.
- 16 April – Laurence Olivier's film Richard III is released.
- 21 April – National newspapers published for the first time after a month-long strike by maintenance workers.
- 23 April – Chelsea F.C. who have previously never won the league title nor the FA Cup, are Football League First Division champions and will be England's first entrants into UEFA's new European Cup next season if they accept the invitation to compete.
- 30 April – Pietro Annigoni's portrait of the Queen is unveiled.
- 1 May – The last Cornish engine pumping in the metalliferous mines of Cornwall is shut down at South Crofty.
- 4–6 May – A severe gale strips topsoil across Norfolk.
- 5 May – American virologist Dr Jonas Salk promotes a polio vaccine in Britain, with the 500,000th person receiving a vaccine against the disease.
- 7 May – Newcastle United secure the FA Cup for the sixth time with a 3-1 win over Manchester City at Wembley Stadium.
- 14 May – Warrington win the Rugby League Championship title for the third time; they will not win it again within the following 70 years.
- 24 May
  - Wartime film The Dam Busters is released.
  - With three days to go before the General Election, all major opinion polls show the Conservative government well placed for reelection.
- 25 May – Joe Brown and George Band are the first to climb Kanchenjunga, as part of the 1955 British Kanchenjunga expedition led by Charles Evans.
- 27 May – Anthony Eden wins the General Election for the Conservative Party with a majority of 31 seats, an improvement on the 17-seat majority gained by his predecessor Sir Winston Churchill four years ago. Between them, the Conservative and Labour parties take 96.1% of the popular vote. Notable newcomers to the Conservative benches in the House of Commons include William Whitelaw and Geoffrey Rippon.
- 29 May – Associated Society of Locomotive Engineers and Firemen (ASLEF) calls a strike on British Railways which continues until 14 June, leading to a state of emergency being declared on 31 May.
- 6 June – Children and Young Persons (Harmful Publications) Act comes into effect, with intention of protecting children from horror comics.
- 16 June – Submarine HMS Sidon sinks in Portland Harbour with the loss of thirteen crew following an explosion caused by a faulty torpedo on board.
- 30 June
  - A Gloster Meteor jet fighter crashes on takeoff from RAF West Malling in Kent, killing both crew and two fruit-pickers on the ground. On the same day, two Hawker Sea Hawk jet fighters flying from RNAS Lossiemouth in Scotland independently crash into the North Sea; one pilot is killed.
  - The Simonstown Agreement provides for control of the naval base at Simon's Town to transfer from the British Royal Navy to the South African Navy.
- Summer – Heat wave and associated drought.
- July – Unemployment stands at a modern low of just over 215,000, meaning that barely 1% of the workforce is currently without a job.
- 9 July
  - Bertrand Russell issues the Russell-Einstein Manifesto highlighting the dangers posed by nuclear weapons.
  - Police procedural Dixon of Dock Green, starring Jack Warner, makes its debut on the BBC Television Service, it will run for 21 years.
- 13 July – Ruth Ellis becomes the last woman to be hanged in the UK, at HM Prison Holloway, for shooting dead a lover, David Blakely, outside a pub in Hampstead (north London) on 10 April (Easter Sunday).
- 17 July – Stirling Moss becomes the first English winner of the British Grand Prix at Aintree Motor Racing Circuit.
- 18 July – Winterborne St Martin (in Dorset) enters the UK Weather Records with the highest 24-hour total rainfall at 279mm. (Note: This total was reported for the Meteorological Day from 0900–0900 GMT. Other 24 hour periods have exceeded this value (November 2009 and December 2015), but not during the meteorological day.)
- 25–27 July – 'Operation Sandcastle': The first load of deteriorating captured Nazi German bombs filled with Tabun (nerve agent) is shipped from Cairnryan on the SS Empire Claire for scuttling in the Atlantic Ocean.
- 26 July – Chelsea F.C. withdraws from the new European Cup on the instructions of the Football League.
- 30 July – Philip Larkin makes a train journey from Hull to Grantham which inspires his poem The Whitsun Weddings.
- 3 August
  - Ministry of Housing and Local Government issues Circular 42/55 inviting local planning authorities to establish green belts.
  - English language premiere of Samuel Beckett's play Waiting for Godot, directed by Peter Hall, opens at the Arts Theatre, London.
- 26 August – Hammer Film Productions' The Quatermass Xperiment is released.
- 27 August – The Guinness Book of Records is first published.
- 18 August – British tourist Janet Marshall is murdered in France.
- 29 August – A Royal Air Force English Electric Canberra jet engined medium bomber sets a new world altitude record of 65,876ft (20,079m).
- 4 September – Richard Baker and Kenneth Kendall become the first BBC Television newsreaders to be seen reading the news.
- 7 September – Meld wins the Fillies Triple Crown having finished first in the 1,000 Guineas Stakes, Epsom Oaks and St. Leger Stakes.
- 14 September – Airfix produce their first scale model aircraft kit of the Supermarine Spitfire at 1/72 scale.
- 18 September
  - The People newspaper makes public that Guy Burgess and Donald Maclean, who defected to the Soviet Union in 1951, were spies and not merely diplomats as previously reported.
  - The United Kingdom annexes Rockall.
- 22 September – The Independent Television Authority's first ITV franchise begins broadcasting the UK's first commercial television station in London, ending the 18-year monopoly of the BBC. The first advertisement shown is for Gibbs SR toothpaste. On the same day, the popular BBC Radio serial The Archers kills off the character Grace Archer.
- 23 September – Barbara Mandell becomes Britain's first female newsreader, presenting ITN's Midday News bulletin on ITV.
- 26 September – Clarence Birdseye begins selling fish fingers in Britain.
- October – Dame Evelyn Sharp appointed Permanent Secretary at the Ministry of Housing and Local Government, the first woman Civil Servant to attain this most senior position within a UK Ministry.
- 23 October – Kim Philby is named as the "Third Man" of the Cambridge Spy Ring in the US press, a claim repeated on 25 October in the House of Commons by Marcus Lipton.
- 31 October – Princess Margaret announces that she does not intend to marry divorced Group Captain Peter Townsend.
- 7 November – The Foreign Secretary denies in Parliament that Kim Philby is the "Third Man" of the Cambridge Spy Ring.
- 19 November – C. Northcote Parkinson first articulates "Parkinson's Law", the semi-serious adage Work expands so as to fill the time available for its completion.
- 20 November – Milton rail crash: an excursion train takes a crossover too fast and derails at Milton, near Didcot: 11 killed, 157 injured.
- Late November – Lonnie Donegan's 1954 skiffle recording of Rock Island Line is released as a single; it becomes a major hit in 1956.
- 2 December – Barnes rail crash at Barnes, South London, a collision due to signal error and consequent fire: 13 killed, 35 injured.
- 7 December – Clement Attlee resigns as leader of the Labour Party after twenty years at the age of 72.
- 8 December – The Ealing comedy film The Ladykillers is released.
- 9 December – Cumbernauld, Scotland, is designated as a New town.
- 12 December – Christopher Cockerell patents his design of hovercraft.
- 14 December – Hugh Gaitskell becomes leader of the Labour Party. The 49-year-old MP was previously the treasurer of the party and served as chancellor during the final year of the previous Labour government.
- 16 December – The Queen opens a new terminal at London Airport.
- 20 December – Cardiff becomes the official capital of Wales.
- Mary Quant opens her first fashion boutique, Bazaar, in the King's Road, Chelsea.

== Publications ==
- Kingsley Amis's comic novel That Uncertain Feeling.
- Derrick Sherwin Bailey's study Homosexuality and the Western Christian Tradition.
- Henry Cecil's comic novel Brothers in Law.
- Agatha Christie's Hercule Poirot novel Hickory Dickory Dock.
- G. R. Elton's history England Under the Tudors.
- Ian Fleming's James Bond novel Moonraker.
- Graham Greene's novel The Quiet American.
- W. G. Hoskins' historical geography The Making of the English Landscape.
- Aldous Huxley's novel The Genius and the Goddess.
- Philip Larkin's poetry collection The Less Deceived.
- C. S. Lewis' high fantasy Narnia novel The Magician's Nephew and spiritual autobiography Surprised by Joy.
- Alistair MacLean's adventure novel HMS Ulysses.
- J. J. Marric's police procedural novel Gideon's Day.
- Ian Nairn's special issue of Architectural Review, "Outrage".
- J. R. R. Tolkien's high fantasy novel The Return of the King, third of The Lord of the Rings trilogy.
- Alfred Wainwright's first hand-drawn guidebook A Pictorial Guide to the Lakeland Fells, Book 1: The Eastern Fells.
- Evelyn Waugh's novel Officers and Gentlemen, second of the Sword of Honour trilogy.
- Donald J. West's study Homosexuality.
- John Wyndham's science fiction novel The Chrysalids.

== Births ==
=== January–June ===
- 1 January
  - Mary Beard, classicist
  - Simon Schaffer, academic and historian of science and philosophy
- 3 January – Helen O'Hara, rock violinist
- 5 January – Jimmy Mulville, comedian, actor, producer and screenwriter, co-founder of Hat Trick Productions
- 6 January – Rowan Atkinson, comedy performer
- 15 January – Nigel Benson, author and illustrator
- 18 January – Lionel Barber, journalist
- 19 January
  - Tony Mansfield, singer-songwriter and producer
  - Simon Rattle, orchestral conductor
- 27 January – Alexander Stuart, novelist and screenwriter in the United States
- 1 February – Virginia Elliott, equestrian
- 3 February
  - Sue Ion, nuclear scientist
  - Kirsty Wark, Scottish television presenter
- 5 February – Melanie Johnson, British politician
- 9 February – Charles Shaughnessy, television actor in the United States and peer
- 10 February – Chris Adams, wrestler (died 2001)
- 12 February – Paul Geoffrey, actor (died 2023)
- 18 February – Miles Tredinnick, singer-songwriter and playwright
- 23 February – Howard Jones, pop keyboardist and singer-songwriter
- 28 February – Bob Kerslake, head of the home civil service (died 2023)
- 1 March – Timothy Laurence, admiral and second husband of Anne, Princess Royal
- 11 March – Peter Bennett-Jones, television producer
- 14 March – Nigel Biggar, Anglican priest, theologian, and ethicist
- 18 March – Jeff Stelling, television sports presenter
- 19 March – John Burnside, Scottish poet and fiction writer (died 2024)
- 28 March – John Alderdice, Alliance Party of Northern Ireland politician and Speaker of the Northern Ireland Assembly
- 29 March – Marina Sirtis, television actress in the United States
- 31 March – Angus Young, Scottish-born Australian guitarist
- 1 April – Sal Brinton, politician
- 3 April – Michael Burleigh, historian
- 5 April
  - Anthony Horowitz, novelist and screenwriter
  - Janice Long, born Janice Chegwin, radio disc jockey (died 2021)
- 10 April – Lesley Garrett, soprano
- 11 April – Piers Sellers, English-born meteorologist and astronaut (died 2016)
- 17 April – Pete Shelley, rock singer, songwriter and guitarist, co-founder of Buzzcocks (died 2018)
- 22 April – Geoffrey Vos, judge, Master of the Rolls
- 23 April – Tony Miles, chess player (died 2001)
- 24 April – Margaret Moran, Labour politician and convicted criminal
- 25 April – John Nunn, chess player and mathematician
- 28 April
  - Eddie Jobson, rock keyboardist and violinist
  - Tim Martin, businessman
- 1 May – Nick Feldman, rock musician
- 2 May – Willie Miller, Scottish footballer
- 6 May – John Hutton, Baron Hutton of Furness, Labour politician
- 11 May – Paul Rowen, Liberal Democrat politician and MP for Rochdale
- 12 May – David Anfam, art historian (died 2024)
- 13 May – Garry Bushell, newspaper columnist, rock music journalist and singer, television presenter, writer and political activist
- 16 May – Hazel O'Connor, singer
- 21 May – Paul Barber, field hockey player
- 22 May – Dale Winton, broadcast presenter (died 2018)
- 30 May – Topper Headon, born Nicholas Headon, rock drummer (The Clash)
- 31 May
  - Joe Longthorne, entertainer (died 2019)
  - Lynne Truss, writer
- 4 June – Val McDermid, Scottish crime novelist
- 7 June – Jo Gilbert, film producer and casting director (died 2018)
- 8 June – Tim Berners-Lee, inventor of the World Wide Web
- 13 June – Alan Hansen, Scottish footballer and television presenter
- 14 June
  - Gillian Bailey, child actress
  - Paul O'Grady, talk show host, comedian and drag queen (died 2023)
- 19 June – Asgar, celebrity hair stylist
- 23 June – Pamela Rooke, model and actress (died 2022)
- 26 June
  - Mick Jones, rock guitarist (The Clash)
  - Steve Whitaker, artist (died 2008)

=== July–December ===
- 6 July – Michael Boyd, theatre director (died 2023)
- 12 July – Timothy Garton Ash, modern historian
- 18 July – Terry Chambers, rock drummer
- 20 July – Jem Finer, folk rock banjoist, composer and multimedia artist
- 21 July – Henry Priestman, English pop singer-songwriter, keyboardist and producer
- 29 July – Stephen Timms, Labour politician
- 6 August – Gordon J. Brand, golfer
- 13 August – Paul Greengrass, film director
- 14 August – Gillian Taylforth, television actress
- 23 August – David Learner, actor
- 1 September – Bruce Foxton, rock bass guitarist and vocalist
- 3 September – Steve Jones, guitarist (Sex Pistols)
- 5 September – John Bentley, dual-code rugby football player
- 16 September – Janet Ellis, children's television presenter
- 20 September – David Haig, actor
- 29 September – Gareth Davies, rugby union player
- 30 September – Martin Millett, archaeologist
- 2 October
  - Philip Oakey, pop singer-songwriter
  - Nancy Rothwell, physiologist
- 7 October – Clinton Bennett, scholar of religions, specialist in the study of Islam
- 9 October – Steve Ovett, athlete
- 18 October – Timmy Mallett, television presenter
- 28 October – Digby Jones, businessman
- 29 October – Roger O'Donnell, rock keyboardist
- 30 October – Jeremy Black, historian
- 12 November – Les McKeown, singer (Bay City Rollers) (died 2021)
- 14 November – Philip Egan, bishop
- 17 November
  - Peter Cox, pop singer-songwriter (Go West)
  - Amanda Levete, architect
- 22 November – George Alagiah, Ceylonese-born journalist and television news presenter (died 2023)
- 24 November – Ian Botham, cricketer
- 30 November – Billy Idol, born William Broad, rock singer
- 4 December – Philip Hammond, Chancellor of the Exchequer
- 6 December – Rick Buckler, drummer (died 2025)
- 13 December – Glenn Roeder, football player and manager (died 2021)
- 15 December – Paul Simonon, rock bass guitarist (The Clash)
- 23 December – Carol Ann Duffy, Scottish poet

=== Undated ===
- Rebecca Salter, printmaker and multimedia abstract artist, President of the Royal Academy
- Phil Sawdon, artist, writer and academic

== Deaths ==
- 7 January – Lamorna Birch, painter (born 1869)
- 10 January – Annette Mills, television presenter (born 1894)
- 29 January – Sir Rhys Rhys-Williams, Welsh politician (born 1865)
- 11 March – Sir Alexander Fleming, Scottish bacteriologist, recipient of the Nobel Prize in Physiology or Medicine (born 1881)
- 16 April – Frank Halford, aeronautical engineer (born 1894)
- 22 April – Herbert MacNair, Scottish artist (born 1868)
- 27 April – Ambrose Bebb, author (born 1894)
- 9 May – Kate Booth, Salvation Army officer (born 1858)
- 11 May – Gilbert Jessop, cricketer (born 1874)
- 21 May – Dame Lilian Barker, humanitarian, promoter of women's welfare and penal reformer (born 1874)
- 5 June – Sir Herbert Stanley, Governor of Northern Rhodesia, Ceylon and Southern Rhodesia (born 1872)
- 14 June – Jacob Moritz Blumberg, surgeon, gynaecologist and radium therapist (born 1873 in Germany)
- 3 July – Beatrice Chase, writer (born 1874)
- 9 July – Don Beauman, racing driver (born 1928)
- 13 July – Ruth Ellis, Welsh-born murderer (born 1926)
- 18 July – Billy McCandless, Irish footballer (born 1894)
- 16 September – Leo Amery, politician (born 1873)
- 28 September – Lionel Rees, Welsh airman, Victoria Cross recipient (born 1884)
- 11 October – Hector McNeil, Scottish politician (born 1907)
- 14 October – Harry Parr-Davies, Welsh songwriter (born 1914)
- 15 October – Thomas Jones (T. J.), Welsh educationalist (born 1870)
- 14 November – Ruby M. Ayres, romance novelist (born 1881)
- 25 November – Sir Arthur Tansley, botanist and ecologist (born 1871)
- 27 December – Alfred Carpenter, naval officer, Victoria Cross recipient (born 1881)
- 31 December – Cyril Garbett, Anglican prelate, Archbishop of York (born 1875)

== See also ==
- 1955 in British music
- 1955 in British television
- List of British films of 1955
