= Frisbie =

Frisbie may refer to:

== Surname ==
- Alvah and Martha Frisbie, Iowa pastor and teacher
- Daniel D. Frisbie, politician
- Parker Frisbie (1940–2018), American sociologist
- Robert Dean Frisbie, travel writer

== Other ==
- Frisbie (band)
- Frisbie Island (disambiguation)
- Frisbie Pie Company
- Alvah and Martha Frisbie, (Frisbie School, Des Moines, Iowa)

== See also ==
- Frisbee
- Frisbee (disambiguation)
