= Sidney Weintraub =

Sidney Weintraub may refer to:

- Sidney Weintraub (economist, born 1914) (1914–1983), American economist
- Sidney Weintraub (economist, born 1922) (1922–2014), American economist

== See also ==
- Sy Weintraub (1923–2000), American film and television producer
