= Monica Rose =

British TV quiz show hostess

- Born: Monica Angela Rose; 11 February 1948; London, England
- Died: 2 February 1994 (aged 45); Leicester, England
- Occupation: Game show hostess
- Years active: 1963–1977
- Height: 4 ft 9 in (1.45 m)
- Spouse: Terry Dunnell (m. 1982)

Monica Angela Rose (11 February 1948 – 2 February 1994) was a British TV quiz show hostess, who appeared on Double Your Money and The Sky's the Limit, both presented by Hughie Green. Rose was known for her Cockney accent, a novelty among TV presenters of the time.

== Biography and showbusiness career ==
Rose was born in White City, London in 1948. Her father was a London Underground train driver and her mother a cleaner at White City Stadium. In 1963, at the age of just 15, whilst working as a young accounts clerk, she was given tickets for a recording of the Hughie Green quiz show called Double Your Money. The show offered a choice of 42 subjects and offered £1 for the answer to a question given by the host with the chance to double their money from £1 up to a maximum of £32. The top prize was £1,000 (equivalent to £18,000 in 2025). Rose was plucked from the audience to take part and despite winning only £8 (on her chosen subject of 'Famous Women') she had the strength of personality to persuade Green (he was "impressed by her cockney charm and manner") to invite her back as a guest hostess on the show six weeks later. She was quoted as saying "Coming from a rough council estate, it was a lot to take in. Being picked up in a Rolls (referring to a Rolls-Royce motor car) and travelling by private plane." She stayed for three years until leaving although returned to the show before it was taken off air in July 1968 as a result of the broadcaster, Associated-Rediffusion, losing their franchise later that month.

Success for Rose had included a stage act with Green, based on the format of Double Your Money. The stage act was popular in summer seasons and their act was even shown in a Royal Variety Performance. In 1965 when Double Your Money was taken to the Soviet Union, the Soviet cultural attache, who was based in London, made it a condition that 'the little cockney girl Monica' had to go with the performance. A year later, in December 1966, Rose performed a duet with her co-presenter Hughie Green which was recorded on the 'B' side of the single "Cuddle up Baby" called "Clap Your Hands". The music to "Clap Your Hands" was written by Barrie Gosney a presenter who appeared in many television commercials and advertising magazines.

She later worked on The Sky's the Limit which was broadcast from 10 July 1970 until 5 July 1974. This was a travel-themed version of the show Double Your Money. The questions were based on geography and the top prize was 21,000 air miles and £600 in spending money (equivalent to £8,000 in 2025).

== Personal life ==
Rose left show business in 1977 and was admitted to hospital three years later suffering from a nervous breakdown. In 1982 she married Terry Dunnell a Baptist lay preacher and officer of a religious group called the Frontier Youth Trust. Dunnell wrote several books on Christianity including Mission and Young People at Risk: a Challenge to the Church written in 1985. Rose became a Christian and settled with him in Leicester where she worked as a checkout operator in a supermarket. She paid regular visits to a local young offenders' centre up until 1993. After battling depression, Rose took her own life by overdosing on antidepressants and tranquillisers in 1994.
