= Michael Miles =

New Zealand-born television presenter

- Born: Michael John Miles; 1 June 1919; Wellington, New Zealand
- Died: 17 February 1971 (aged 51); Spain
- Occupations: TV presenter, radio producer, newsreader
- Television: Take Your Pick
- Children: 2

Michael John Miles (1 June 1919 – 17 February 1971) was a New Zealand-born television presenter in Great Britain known for the game show Take Your Pick from 1955 to 1968, produced by Associated Rediffusion and later by Rediffusion London.

== Early life ==
Born in Wellington, New Zealand, Miles left school to become a broadcaster after persuading his local station to hire him. He then travelled to Australia, before moving on to Singapore as a newsreader, leaving only days before the island was invaded by the Japanese Army during the Second World War.

== Career ==
Although he produced radio shows during the war years, it was with the transfer of his quiz show Take Your Pick to television that he made his name. The programme, which had already been heard on Radio Luxembourg for three years, was one of the first game shows on ITV in September 1955 when the new channel began its broadcasts (ITV's other early quiz show was Double Your Money, presented by Hughie Green). Take Your Pick, which was masterminded by Miles (who was reputed to earn the phenomenal sum of £20,000 a year) relied on public participation and was a ratings success. The show was cancelled in 1968, when producers Associated Rediffusion were forced to become Thames Television in the ITV franchise reshuffle. (The show was revived in 1992 with Des O'Connor.)

Miles then hosted a similar show called Wheel of Fortune, not to be confused with the later game show of the same name, for Southern Television. Rumours of an alcohol problem were unfounded; he in fact had epilepsy and often locked himself in his dressing room, ashamed of his condition. He died in 1971 aged 51, while on business in Spain. Miles was married with one son and a daughter.

Miles and Take Your Pick were parodied in a Monty Python sketch (titled "Spot the Brain Cell" in its LP version), in which John Cleese as a quizmaster called Michael cheerfully mocks the stupidity of a female contestant played by Terry Jones.

Preceded by N/A	Host of Take Your Pick; 1955–1968	Succeeded by Des O'Connor
