= Frisbee (disambiguation) =

A frisbee is a type of gliding toy.

Frisbee may also refer to:

- Frisbee (ride), an amusement ride
- Frisbee (sculpture), an artwork by Patrick Villiers Farrow
- Frisbee (TV channel), an Italian TV channel
- Frisbee, Missouri, a community in the United States
- Frisbee, an album by Caramelos de Cianuro
- "Frisbee", a song by JVG
- "Frisbee", a song by Super Furry Animals from the album Fuzzy Logic
- "Frisbee", an alternative name for "Coaster" by NOFX

== See also ==
- Frisbee Jenkins, American drag queen
- Frisby (disambiguation)
- Frisbie (disambiguation)
- Lonnie Frisbee, American hippie and evangelist
