= Gerry McInerney =

Gerry McInerney may refer to:

- Gerry McInerney (Galway hurler) (born 1965), retired Irish hurler
- Gerry McInerney (Clare hurler) (born 1961), Irish hurler

== See also ==
- Geraldine McInerney, Ireland's first female television newsreader
