= List of British films of 1955 =

British films released in 1955

A list of films produced in the United Kingdom in 1955 (see 1955 in film):

== 1955 ==
Title	Director	Cast	Genre	Notes
1955
Abdulla the Great	Gregory Ratoff	Gregory Ratoff, Kay Kendall, Sydney Chaplin	Comedy	
Above Us the Waves	Ralph Thomas	John Mills, John Gregson, Donald Sinden	War	
Alias John Preston	David MacDonald	Betta St. John, Alexander Knox, Christopher Lee	Horror	
All for Mary	Wendy Toye	Nigel Patrick, Kathleen Harrison, David Tomlinson	Comedy	
An Alligator Named Daisy	J. Lee Thompson	Donald Sinden, Jeannie Carson, Stanley Holloway	Comedy	
As Long as They're Happy	J. Lee Thompson	Jack Buchanan, Janette Scott, Jeannie Carson	Comedy	
Barbados Quest	Bernard Knowles	Tom Conway, Delphi Lawrence, Brian Worth	Crime	
Before I Wake	Albert S. Rogell	Mona Freeman, Jean Kent, Maxwell Reed	Mystery	
The Blue Peter	Wolf Rilla	Kieron Moore, Sarah Lawson, Greta Gynt	Adventure	
The Brain Machine	Ken Hughes	Maxwell Reed, Elizabeth Allan, Patrick Barr	Thriller	
Breakaway	Henry Cass	Tom Conway, Michael Balfour, Honor Blackman	Crime	
Cast a Dark Shadow	Lewis Gilbert	Dirk Bogarde, Margaret Lockwood, Kay Walsh	Suspense	
Children Galore	Terence Fisher	Eddie Byrne, June Thorburn, Betty Ann Davies	Comedy	
The Cockleshell Heroes	José Ferrer	José Ferrer, Trevor Howard, Christopher Lee	War	
The Colditz Story	Guy Hamilton	John Mills, Eric Portman, Frederick Valk	War	
Confession	Ken Hughes	Sydney Chaplin, Audrey Dalton, John Bentley	Drama	
The Constant Husband	Sidney Gilliat	Rex Harrison, Margaret Leighton, Kay Kendall	Comedy	
Contraband Spain	Lawrence Huntington	Richard Greene, Anouk Aimée, Michael Denison	Crime	Co-production with Spain
The Dam Busters	Michael Anderson	Richard Todd, Michael Redgrave, Basil Sydney	War	
The Deep Blue Sea	Anatole Litvak	Vivien Leigh, Kenneth More, Eric Portman	Drama	
The Delavine Affair	Douglas Peirce	Peter Reynolds, Honor Blackman, Gordon Jackson	Crime	
Doctor at Sea	Ralph Thomas	Dirk Bogarde, Brigitte Bardot, James Robertson Justice	Comedy	
The End of the Affair	Edward Dmytryk	Deborah Kerr, Van Johnson, John Mills	Drama	
Escapade	Philip Leacock	John Mills, Alastair Sim, Yvonne Mitchell	Comedy drama	
The Flaw	Terence Fisher	John Bentley, Donald Houston, Rona Anderson	Thriller	
Footsteps in the Fog	Arthur Lubin	Stewart Granger, Jean Simmons, Belinda Lee	Thriller	
Fun at St. Fanny's	Maurice Elvey	Cardew Robinson, Vera Day, Fred Emney	Comedy	
Geordie	Frank Launder	Bill Travers, Alastair Sim, Norah Gorsen	Sports comedy	
The Gilded Cage	John Gilling	Alex Nicol, Veronica Hurst, Ursula Howells	Crime	
The Glass Cage	Montgomery Tully	John Ireland, Honor Blackman, Eric Pohlmann	Mystery	
The Green Carnation	John Lemont	Wayne Morris, Mary Germaine, Walter Rilla	Crime	
The Hornet's Nest	Charles Saunders	Paul Carpenter, June Thorburn, Marla Landi	Comedy adventure	
I Am a Camera	Henry Cornelius	Julie Harris, Laurence Harvey, Shelley Winters	Drama	
It's a Great Day	John Warrington	Ruth Dunning, Edward Evans, Sid James	Comedy	
Joe MacBeth	Ken Hughes	Paul Douglas, Ruth Roman, Bonar Colleano	Drama	
John and Julie	William Fairchild	Moira Lister, Sid James, Peter Sellers	Comedy	
Josephine and Men	Roy Boulting	Glynis Johns, Donald Sinden, Jack Buchanan	Comedy	
A Kid for Two Farthings	Carol Reed	Celia Johnson, Diana Dors, David Kossoff	Drama	
King's Rhapsody	Herbert Wilcox	Anna Neagle, Errol Flynn, Patrice Wymore	Musical	
The Ladykillers	Alexander Mackendrick	Alec Guinness, Herbert Lom, Peter Sellers	Comedy	Number 13 in the list of BFI Top 100 British films
Little Red Monkey	Ken Hughes	Richard Conte, Rona Anderson, Sylva Langova	Thriller	
The Love Match	David Paltenghi	Arthur Askey, Shirley Eaton, Edward Chapman	Comedy	
The Lyons in Paris	Val Guest	Ben Lyon, Bebe Daniels, Barbara Lyon	Comedy	
Man of the Moment	John Paddy Carstairs	Norman Wisdom, Belinda Lee, Lana Morris	Comedy	
The Man Who Loved Redheads	Harold French	Moira Shearer, John Justin, Roland Culver	Comedy	
Miss Tulip Stays the Night	Leslie Arliss	Diana Dors, Patrick Holt, Jack Hulbert	Comedy	
The Night My Number Came Up	Leslie Norman	Michael Redgrave, Sheila Sim, Denholm Elliott	Thriller	
No Smoking	Henry Cass	Reg Dixon, Peter Martyn, Belinda Lee	Comedy	
Oh... Rosalinda!!	Michael Powell, Emeric Pressburger	Anton Walbrook, Ludmilla Tchérina, Anthony Quayle	Musical	
One Good Turn	John Paddy Carstairs	Norman Wisdom, Joan Rice, Shirley Abicair	Comedy	
One Jump Ahead	Charles Saunders	Paul Carpenter, Diane Hart, Jill Adams	Crime	
One Way Out	Francis Searle	Jill Adams, Eddie Byrne, Lyndon Brook	Crime	
Orders Are Orders	David Paltenghi	Peter Sellers, Tony Hancock, Sid James	Comedy	
Out of the Clouds	Basil Dearden	Anthony Steel, Robert Beatty, James Robertson Justice	Drama	
Passage Home	Roy Ward Baker	Anthony Steel, Peter Finch, Diane Cilento	Drama	
Police Dog	Derek N. Twist	Joan Rice, Sandra Dorne, Tim Turner	Crime	
The Prisoner	Peter Glenville	Alec Guinness, Jack Hawkins, Wilfrid Lawson	Drama	
A Prize of Gold	Mark Robson	Richard Widmark, Mai Zetterling, Nigel Patrick	Crime	
The Quatermass Xperiment	Val Guest	Brian Donlevy, Jack Warner, Margia Dean	Sci-fi	
Quentin Durward	Richard Thorpe	Robert Taylor, Kay Kendall, Robert Morley	Adventure	
Raising a Riot	Wendy Toye	Kenneth More, Shelagh Fraser, Mandy Miller	Comedy	
Reluctant Bride	Henry Cass	John Carroll, Virginia Bruce, Brian Oulton	Comedy	
Richard III	Laurence Olivier	Laurence Olivier, Cedric Hardwicke, John Gielgud	Literary drama	Silver Bear at Berlin
Room in the House	Maurice Elvey	Patrick Barr, Hubert Gregg, Marjorie Rhodes	Comedy	
The Secret	Cy Endfield	Sam Wanamaker, Mandy Miller, André Morell	Crime	
Secret Venture	R. G. Springsteen	Kent Taylor, Jane Hylton, Kathleen Byron	Thriller	
See How They Run	Leslie Arliss	Ronald Shiner, Greta Gynt, James Hayter	Comedy	
The Ship That Died of Shame	Basil Dearden	George Baker, Richard Attenborough, Virginia McKenna	Crime	
Simba	Brian Desmond Hurst	Dirk Bogarde, Donald Sinden, Virginia McKenna	War drama	
Simon and Laura	Muriel Box	Peter Finch, Kay Kendall, Muriel Pavlow	Drama	
Stock Car	Wolf Rilla	Paul Carpenter, Rona Anderson, Susan Shaw	Sports	
Stolen Assignment	Terence Fisher	John Bentley, Hy Hazell, Eddie Byrne	Comedy crime	
Stolen Time	Charles Deane	Richard Arlen, Susan Shaw, Vincent Ball	Crime	
Storm Over the Nile	Zoltan Korda, Terence Young	Anthony Steel, Laurence Harvey, Mary Ure	Action	
Summertime	David Lean	Katharine Hepburn, Rossano Brazzi, Isa Miranda	Romance	
Tangier Assignment	César Fernández Ardavín	Fernando Rey, Bob Simmons, Gustavo Re	Crime	Co-production with Spain
That Lady	Terence Young	Olivia de Havilland, Gilbert Roland, Paul Scofield	Historical drama	
They Can't Hang Me	Val Guest	Terence Morgan, Yolande Donlan, André Morell	Crime	
Three Cases of Murder	David Eady, George More O'Ferrall, Wendy Toye	Alan Badel, Orson Welles, Elizabeth Sellars	Mystery	Anthology
Tiger by the Tail	John Gilling	Larry Parks, Constance Smith, Lisa Daniely	Crime	
The Time of His Life	Leslie S. Hiscott	Richard Hearne, Ellen Pollock, Richard Wattis	Comedy	
A Time to Kill	Charles Saunders	Jack Watling, Rona Anderson, Russell Napier	Crime	
Timeslip	Ken Hughes	Gene Nelson, Faith Domergue, Peter Arne	Sci-fi	
To Paris with Love	Robert Hamer	Alec Guinness, Odile Versois, Elina Labourdette	Comedy	
Touch and Go	Michael Truman	Jack Hawkins, Margaret Johnston, June Thorburn	Comedy	
Track the Man Down	R. G. Springsteen	Kent Taylor, Petula Clark, Walter Rilla	Crime	
Value for Money	Ken Annakin	John Gregson, Diana Dors, Susan Stephen	Comedy	
Where There's a Will	Vernon Sewell	Kathleen Harrison, George Cole, Leslie Dwyer	Comedy	
Windfall	John Gilling	Lionel Jeffries, Jack Watling, Patricia Owens	Comedy	
The Woman for Joe	George More O'Ferrall	Diane Cilento, George Baker, David Kossoff	Drama	
A Yank in Ermine	Gordon Parry	Noelle Middleton, Diana Decker, Edward Chapman,	Comedy	
You Lucky People!	Maurice Elvey	Tommy Trinder, Dora Bryan, Mary Parker	Comedy	

== Short films ==
Title	Director	Cast	Genre	Notes
The Right Person	Peter Cotes	Margo Lorenz, Douglas Wilmer	Drama	

== See also ==
- 1955 in British music
- 1955 in British television
- 1955 in the United Kingdom
