= Music box (disambiguation) =

A music box (also musical box) is a 19th-century automatic musical instrument.

Music box or musical box may also refer to:

== Music ==
=== Albums ===
- Music Box (album), a 1993 album by Mariah Carey
- Music Box (Evelyn King album), 1979
- Music Box (The Monkees album), 2001

=== Songs ===
- "Music Box" (song), a 2009 song by Eminem
- "The Musical Box" (song), a 1971 song by Genesis
- "Music Box", a song by Regina Spektor on a bonus disc of her album Begin to Hope
- "Music Box", a song by Roni Size and DJ Die
- "Music Box", a song by Mariah Carey from the album Music Box
- "Music Box", a song by The Cooper Temple Clause from the album Kick Up the Fire, and Let the Flames Break Loose
- "Music Box", a song by Thrice from the album Vheissu

=== Other music uses ===
- Music Box Tour, 1993 concert tour by Mariah Carey
- The Musical Box (band), a Genesis tribute band
- Music Box, a contestant on season 6 of the NBC series The Voice
- Music box, alternative name for the Appalachian dulcimer

== Film ==
- The Music Box, a 1932 short film starring Laurel and Hardy
- Music Box (film), a 1989 feature film directed by Costa-Gavras
- The Music Box, a 2006 Japanese film by Ng See-yuen
- Music Box Films, a distributor of foreign and independent films

== Television ==
- Music Box (TV channel), an early UK cable channel
- Music Box Brazil, a Brazilian music television channel
- musicbox (German TV channel)
- Music Box Italia, an Italian music television channel
- The Music Box (TV series), a 1957 United Kingdom music variety show produced by Associated-Rediffusion
- Music Box, a 1981 Canadian educational television series produced by Heather Conkie

== Other ==
- Music Box Theatre, a Broadway theater in New York City
- Music Box Theatre (Chicago), Chicago, Illinois
- Music Box Theater (Los Angeles), Los Angeles, California
- Musical Box, a British Medium Mark A Whippet tank that achieved fame for actions during the Battle of Amiens
- The Magical Music Box, a children's magazine, featuring classical music to accompany stories
- Music Box (software), educational software which teaches about computer-generated music
- The Musical Box, Liverpool's oldest record shop, in Tuebrook
