= Something in the City (TV series) =

1959 British television sitcom

Something in the City is a 1959 British television sitcom. Aired on ITV, it was produced by Jack Hylton Productions for Associated-Rediffusion Television. Cast included Eric Barker, Joan Benham, Pearl Hackney, Diane Hart, Deryck Guyler and Peter Hammond. Five episodes were produced. Unlike most shows by Associated-Rediffusion, the series survives intact.
