= The Sky's the Limit (game show) =

British television game show (1970–1974)

- Created by: Vic Hallums
- Presented by: Hughie Green
- Starring: Monica Rose; Audrey Graham; Katya Wyeth
- Country of origin: United Kingdom

Production
- Producers: Keith Beckett; Royston Mayoh
- Production company: Yorkshire Television

Original release
- Network: ITV
- Release: 11 July 1970 – 5 July 1974

The Sky's the Limit is a United Kingdom game show first broadcast on 11 July 1970, being a travel-themed version of Double Your Money.

== Background ==
The show was hosted by Hughie Green and co-hosted by Monica Rose, Audrey Graham and Katya Wyeth.

The contestants had to answer questions based on their specialist subject, with every set of answers increasing their prize fund. In the first round, contestants answered questions increasing in value from £1 up to £100 (equivalent to £1,372 in 2025). They then had to answer a special question to qualify for the further rounds.

Further rounds involved contestants being seated in a 'soundproof box'. After the first round questions contained subsequently more parts, so that on the final round the question was a five-part question - all parts had to be answered correctly in each round. The top prize was 21,000 miles of travel and £600 spending money (equivalent to £8,229 in 2025). It was last broadcast on 5 July 1974.

== Production ==
The Director was Royston Mayoh and the producer Peter Holmans.

The theme for the show was released on the York record label. It was recorded by a group called Simplicity, as the B side of their single "Any Minute of Your Life".

Aside from an audio recording in 1970, and three episodes filmed abroad (including Jamaica), all of the videotaped programmes made at Yorkshire TV studios do not exist in the archives.
