= Frisbie (band) =

Frisbie is a power pop quintet based out of Chicago, Illinois. The band is named after Steve Frisbie, one of the band's three singer-songwriters. Beside Frisbie (guitarist and vocalist), the group is made up of Gerald Dowd (drummer), Liam Davis (guitarist and vocalist), Matt Thompson (bassist), and Marcin Fahmy (keyboardist). They released three albums, Subversive Sounds of Love (2000), period. (2003) and New Debut (2007).

== History ==
The band independently released its debut album, The Subversive Sounds of Love, on July 11, 2000, on the now-defunct Hear Diagonally label. Songs from the album garnered a following among fans of underground music and related radio stations as well as musical journalists in that field. The band toured with power pop stalwarts such as Cheap Trick, Matthew Sweet, and Wilco.

Critic John Metzger of The Music Box praised the album, saying that "the group's songs combine the melodic pop of The Beatles with the heavy-handed thunder of The Who and the tight-knit harmonic luster of The Byrds". All Music Guide critic Matt Fink gave a mostly positive review, saying that "few bands have displayed such a mastery of pop songcraft on a debut" and "Frisbie gives hope to the power pop true believers." He also commented that the "personalities involved are never totally evident" and that the group lacked a more "adventurous" sound.

In 2003 they released the acoustic album period., featuring compositions by Zack Kantor, their former drummer. In 2007 they released New Debut.

== See also ==
- Music of Chicago
