= Small Time (TV series) =

British children's television series

Small Time was ITV's first children's programme, lasting from September 1955 until 1966. Initially, it aired as part of Morning Magazine, airing precisely at the end of the strand, and targeted an under-five audience, akin to Watch With Mother on the BBC. It broadcast on Mondays, Wednesdays and Fridays. After 1956, when Associated-Rediffusion cut off its daytime slot, it moved to 4:45pm.

== Overview ==
22 September 1955 was a Thursday and programmes began at 7pm; the following day saw the introduction of a full daytime schedule with Morning Magazine from 11am to 12:30pm; this ended with Small Time at 12:15pm.

In the initial set-up, Small Time consisted of the following items:

- Mondays: Big Black Crayon: Stories and pictures with Rolf Harris and Jean Ford. Viewers were invited to help Rolf draw pictures with the help of the titular crayon.
- Wednesdays: Toybox: Small stories involving hand-crafted toys. In the first outing broadcast on 28 September, it featured two items: Doodle Bird, about a toy duck made out of seven pieces which could be assembled in 59 different ways; followed by Billy Boots, where all characters were portrayed by wood-carved pairs of shoes and boots; the titular Billy Boots was a pair of boy's shoes. These two were devised by Eric Spear and introduced by Susan Spear.
- Fridays: Johnny and Flonny: Created by Paul Hansard, the series featured Johnny, a glove puppet, and Flonny, his rabbit friend. In each episode, Johnny gets involved in mischief most human boys do. The first episode was reported by the press as being "pleasantly done".

By November, Small Time was airing on Tuesdays. These shows were The Little House that Stood on the Hill on Tuesdays and Snoozy the Sea Lion on Thursdays.

Associated-Rediffusion cut off the daytime slot in 1956 and Small Time moved to 4:45pm, before the regular children's programming strand, which, up until mid-1956, was known as Tea-V Time. As the ITV network grew, A-R was also tasked to produce such programmes to air nationwide. Notable shows during this period (which ended in 1966) included The Musical Box (initially with Rolf Harris but later replaced by Wally Whyton), Fireside Story, Ivor the Engine and Basil Brush's first television appearance, The Three Scampis. In London, the strand featured interactions between presenters, which included Muriel Young and Wally Whyton, alongside hand puppet characters, such as Pussy Cat Willom, Ollie Beak and Fred Barker. Some of the local presenters in London later went on to make output for older children in 1961; moreover, Small Time served as a basis for birthday greeting strands and puppet characters to other companies with the launch of new regional franchises. Ollie Beak, the owl character, was also known for introducing The Beatles' first national television presentation in the UK on 4 December 1962.

Small Time ended in 1966.
