= Parker Frisbie =

American sociologist (1940–2018)

W. Parker Frisbie
- Born: September 5, 1940; Yorktown, Texas, U.S.
- Died: February 12, 2018 (aged 77); Baton Rouge, Louisiana, U.S.
- Occupation: Sociologist

William "Parker" Frisbie (September 5, 1940 – February 12, 2018) was an American sociologist who studied demography and mortality. Frisbie served as the chair of the sociology department at the University of Texas at Austin and was the director of the university's Population Research Center.

== Works ==
- The Demography of Racial and Ethnic Groups, edited with Frank D. Bean (1978)
- Sustenance Organization and Migration in Nonmetropolitan America, with Dudley L. Poston Jr. (1978)
- Spatial Processes, with John D. Kasarda

== Sources ==
- The Son of Texas
