= Frank D. Bean =

American sociologist

- Born: May 20, 1942 (age 84)
- Education: Duke University
- Scientific career
- Fields: Sociology
- Workplaces: University of California, Irvine

Frank Dawson Bean Jr. (born May 20, 1942) is Chancellor's Professor of Sociology and Director of the Center for Research on Immigration, Population and Public Policy at the University of California, Irvine. Bean came to Irvine in 1999, after holding positions at the University of Texas and Indiana University. He has a PhD in sociology from Duke University.

== Career ==
Author or editor of more than 150 scholarly articles and chapters and 18 books, Bean's research focuses on international migration, unauthorized migration, U.S. immigration policy, and the demography of the U.S. Hispanic population. Bean has been member of the Council on Foreign Relations, he has been a Guggenheim Fellow and held visiting scholar positions at the Russell Sage Foundation, the Transatlantic Academy, the American Academy in Berlin, the Research School of Social Sciences at the Australian National University, and the Center for U.S./Mexico Studies at the University of California at San Diego.

Bean has been a Principal Investigator of NICHD behavioral science grants in population in every decade since the inception of the program in 1969. In 2011, he received the Distinguished Lifetime Scholarly Career Award in International Migration at the annual meeting of the American Sociological Association.

== Research ==
=== Immigrant fertility and demography ===
His book Mexican American Fertility Patterns (co-authored with Gray Swicegood in 1985) received a Choice award for academic distinction from the American Library Association. This study argued that Mexican-origin women have higher birth rates because of their lower socioeconomic standing and work opportunities, not because of their cultural orientations, and that their fertility changes as they achieve higher levels of education.

Bean's 1987 book The Hispanic Population of the United States (with Marta Tienda), was commissioned by the National Committee for Research on the 1980 Census and the Russell Sage Foundation. The work provides a comprehensive portrayal of Hispanics and addresses the importance of considering Hispanic national-origin and nativity groups separately in policy-relevant research.

=== Unauthorized Mexican migration ===
Bean co-directed a large research program at The Urban Institute and Rand Corporation on the implementation and effectiveness of the 1986 Immigration Reform and Control Act (IRCA), legislation that initiated employer penalties for hiring unauthorized workers and permitted legalization of unauthorized immigrants in the country.

The research developed estimates of how IRCA affected unauthorized migration and how various factors affected flows from Mexico. In the mid-1990s, he led a group of U.S. and Mexican scholars seeking to improve estimates of unauthorized migration for the Mexico/U.S. Binational Migration Study, mandated by the U.S. Commission on Immigration Reform. The research provided what The New York Times described in a front-page story "the first authoritative estimate of the net annual flow of illegal Mexican workers into the United States." This work helped to spawn adjustments for coverage error in all subsequent official and widely accepted estimates of unauthorized migration.

=== Immigrant incorporation and diversity ===
His book America's Newcomers and the Dynamics of Diversity (with Gillian Stevens) introduced the idea that predominantly lower-skilled labor migrant groups like Mexicans experience delays in (but not blockage of) incorporation, especially when their members arrive as unauthorized entrants. Showing that many incorporation processes for such groups do not substantially emerge until the third generation, the study won the 2003 American Sociological Association's Otis Dudley Duncan award for the best book in social demography.

Bean's edited research volume, Help or Hindrance? The Economic Implications of Immigration for African Americans (with Daniel Hamermesh), received an ALA Choice award for academic distinction. Also, his 2010 book, The Diversity Paradox: Immigration and the Color Line in 21st Century America (with Jennifer Lee), on how immigration has increased U.S. ethnoracial diversity and altered notions of racial identity in the United States, was awarded the ASA's 2011 Otis Dudley Duncan award for the best book in social demography. The latter study refutes claims that diversity fosters suspicion and withdrawal and shows instead that immigration-related diversity, more so than black-white diversity, increases intermarriage and leads to the dissolution of ethnoracial color lines, although less so for Black people compared to other groups.

== Recent Books ==
- Parents Without Papers: The Progress and Pitfalls of Mexican American Integration (with Susan K. Brown and James D. Bachmeier), New York: Russell Sage, 2015.
- The Diversity Paradox: Immigration and the Color Line in 21st Century America (with Jennifer Lee), New York: Russell Sage, 2010.
- America's Newcomers and the Dynamics of Diversity (with Gillian Stevens), New York: Russell Sage (ASA Arnold Rose Monograph Series), 2003.
- Immigration and Opportunity: Race, Ethnicity, and Employment in the United States (with Stephanie Bell-Rose), Russell Sage Foundation, 1999.
- Help or Hindrance? The Economic Implications of Immigration for African Americans (with Dan Hamermesh), Russell Sage Foundation, 1998.
- At the Crossroads: Mexico and U.S. Immigration Policy (with Rodolfo de la Garza, Bryan Roberts, and Sidney Weintraub), Rowman and Littlefield, 1997.
