= 1955 in British music =

This is a summary of 1955 in music of all genres in the United Kingdom.

== Events ==
- 2 January – Michael Tippett's 50th birthday is celebrated in a concert held at Morley College, in which Benjamin Britten and Peter Pears perform.
- 27 January – Premiere of Michael Tippett's opera The Midsummer Marriage at the Royal Opera House, Covent Garden in London, conducted by John Pritchard, with designs by Barbara Hepworth and choreography by John Cranko; it arouses controversy.
- May – The Ivor Novello Awards are launched.
- 4 May – The bass-baritone Peter Dawson records Albert Arlen's song Clancy of the Overflow (to Banjo Paterson's poem) with the London Symphony Orchestra conducted by Charles Mackerras. It is 73-year-old Dawson's last recording.
- 11 May – Arthur Bliss's Violin Concerto receives its first performance in London.
- 8 June – Singers Pearl Carr and Teddy Johnson marry.
- July – Steuart Wilson, a retired singer who resigned in the previous month as an administrator at the Royal Opera House, launches an outspoken campaign against "homosexuality in British music", saying: "The influence of perverts in the world of music has grown beyond all measure. If it is not curbed soon, Covent Garden and other precious musical heritages could suffer irreparable harm."
- 29 November – Juan José Castro conducts the UK premiere of Carlos Chávez's Third Symphony at the Maida Vale Studios with the London Symphony Orchestra.
- Late November – Lonnie Donegan's 1954 skiffle recording of "Rock Island Line" is released: it becomes a major hit in 1956.
- December – The Temperance Seven is founded as a jazz band, initially comprising three members from the Chelsea School of Art in London.
- 8 December – Sir Thomas Beecham is presented with the Order of the White Rose of Finland.
- 13 December – Sir Arthur Bliss's orchestral Meditations on a Theme by John Blow is premiered in Birmingham Town Hall.

== Charts ==
- See UK No.1 Hits of 1955

== Classical music: new works ==
- Malcolm Arnold – Tam O'Shanter Overture
- Arthur Bliss – Violin Concerto
- Eric Coates – Dambusters March
- Peter Maxwell Davies – Trumpet Sonata
- Gerald Finzi – Cello Concerto
- Michael Tippett – Sonata for Four Horns
- Ernst Toch – Symphony No. 3
- Ralph Vaughan Williams – Symphony No. 8
- William Walton – Johannesburg Festival Overture

== Opera ==
- William Alwyn – Farewell Companions (for radio)
- Thea Musgrave – The Abbot of Drimock
- Michael Tippett – The Midsummer Marriage

== Film and Incidental music ==
- John Addison – The Cockleshell Heroes, starring Trevor Howard
- Malcolm Arnold – The Deep Blue Sea, starring Vivien Leigh and Kenneth More
- Francis Chagrin – The Colditz Story, directed by Guy Hamilton, starring John Mills and Eric Portman
- Eric Coates – The Dam Busters, starring Michael Redgrave
- Benjamin Frankel – The End of the Affair, starring Deborah Kerr, Van Johnson, Peter Cushing and John Mills
- William Walton – Richard III, directed by and starring Laurence Olivier

== Musical theatre ==
- 19 December – Cranks, a revue by John Cranko with music by John Addison, opens at the New Watergate Theatre, London.
- Wild Thyme, with music by Donald Swann and lyrics by Philip Guard, starring Betty Paul and Denis Quilley

== Musical films ==
- King's Rhapsody, starring Anna Neagle
- Oh... Rosalinda!!, starring Anton Walbrook

== Births ==
- 3 January – Helen O'Hara, born Helen Bevingto, English pop rock violinist
- 4 January – Mark Hollis, post-rock singer-songwriter (died 2019)
- 19 January
  - Tony Mansfield, synth-pop singer-songwriter and producer (New Musik)
  - Sir Simon Rattle, orchestral conductor
- 25 January – Terry Chimes, punk rock drummer (The Clash)
- 23 February – Howard Jones, synth-pop singer-songwriter
- 27 February – Peter Christopherson, musician, songwriter and director (died 2010)
- 19 March – Paul Edwards, composer of choral music
- 5 April – Janice Long, radio disc jockey (died 2021)
- 9 April – Bob Chilcott, choral composer, conductor and singer
- 10 April – Lesley Garrett, operatic soprano
- 17 April – Pete Shelley, punk rock singer-songwriter and guitarist (Buzzcocks)
- 16 May – Hazel O'Connor, singer
- 22 May – Jerry Dammers, ska musician and songwriter
- 30 May – Topper Headon, punk rock drummer (The Clash)
- 26 June – Mick Jones, English punk rock singer-songwriter and guitarist (The Clash, Big Audio Dynamite, General Public, Carbon/Silicon and London SS)
- 18 July – Terry Chambers, English rock drummer (XTC and Dragon)
- 20 July – Jem Finer, English Celtic punk banjo player and songwriter (The Pogues)
- 30 July – Christopher Warren-Green, violinist and conductor
- 30 August – Andy Pask, English synth-pop bass player and composer
- 1 September – Bruce Foxton, rock guitarist (The Jam)
- 3 September – Steve Jones, punk rock guitarist (Sex Pistols)
- 14 September – William Jackson, Scottish harpist and composer
- 30 September – Frankie Kennedy, Northern Irish folk flute player (died 1994)
- 2 October – Philip Oakey, synth-pop singer-songwriter (The Human League)
- 12 November – Les McKeown, pop singer (Bay City Rollers) (died 2021)
- 17 November – Peter Cox, English pop singer-songwriter (Go West)
- 30 November – Billy Idol, born William Broad, punk rock singer
- 6 December – Edward Tudor-Pole, singer and TV presenter
- 15 December – Paul Simonon, punk rock bassist (The Clash)
- 31 December – Tom Morton, musician, broadcaster and writer

== Deaths ==
- 10 January – Annette Mills, partner of "Muffin the Mule", 60
- 9 March – Louie René, singer and actress, 83
- 12 April – W. H. Anderson, composer, 72
- 4 July – Ruth Vincent, operatic soprano, 78
- 13 August – Florence Easton, soprano, 72
- 14 October – Harry Parr-Davies, composer and songwriter, 41 (perforated ulcer)
- 30 October – Harry Dean, British-born Canadian conductor, pianist, organist and music educator, 76
- 14 November – Carl Denton, Yorkshire-born American conductor, 80
- 21 December – Gladys Ripley, operatic contralto, 47

== See also ==
- 1955 in British television
- 1955 in the United Kingdom
- List of British films of 1955

== Sources ==
- Britten, Benjamin (2004). Reed, Phillip; Cooke, Mervyn; Mitchell, Donald (eds.). Letters from a Life: Selected Letters of Benjamin Britten, Vol 3, 1946–1951. London: Faber and Faber. ISBN 978-0571299300.
- Britten, Benjamin (2008). Reed, Phillip; Cooke, Mervyn; Mitchell, Donald (eds.). Letters from a Life: Selected Letters of Benjamin Britten, Vol 4, 1952–1957. Woodbridge: The Boydell Press. ISBN 9781843833826.
