= Tea-V Time =

Tea-V Time was the children's programming strand on Associated-Rediffusion, the first ITV company, in its first months of operation. It was first broadcast on 23 September 1955 as an introductory programme, given that A-R opened its services the previous evening (a Thursday) at 7:15pm, and, at the time, A-R was in charge of ITV's weekday contract for London.

Tea-V Time was not the first children's programme to air on Associated-Rediffusion or ITV as a whole. The same company had a strand at 12:15, Small Time, which aimed at an audience of children under the age of five, akin to the BBC's Watch With Mother, airing during A-R's Morning Magazine strand. The first Small Time programme (also airing on 23 September 1955) was Johnny and Flonny, a series featuring a glove puppet (Johnny) and a rabbit (Flonny), who were always in trouble. The strand aired three times a week (Mondays, Wednesdays and Fridays).

== Overview and content ==
The introductory programme was billed as What You Will See and announced the structure of the strand from its first full week, commencing 26 September. Each weekday was catered to a specific demographic:

- Mondays: Venture, aimed at boys age 9 to 15
- Tuesdays: Elizabethan Fanfare, aimed at girls age 9 to 15; featuring interviews with girls, half-hour plays, behind-the-scenes of theatrical and ballet performances and, once a month, a disk-jockey show
- Wednesdays: Telebox: aimed at all ages (including parents); featuring a serial, cartoons, "custard pie" comedy and musician Nat Temple
- Thursdays: Flickwiz aimed at teenagers; featuring Hopalong Cassidy episodes, a quiz show and a competition in which childreon wrote the end of the play, with the ending being seen on the strand
- Fridays. Bubble and Squeak, aimed at children ages 5 to 9; featuring cartoons, plays and occasional programmes about pets

To distinguish itself from the BBC, whose strand referred to its target audience as "children" (the BBC's strand was branded at the time as Children's Television), A-R referred to its viewers as "boys and girls", while ABC (later renamed ATV to avoid confusion with ABC Weekend Television referred them as "juniors".

The press at the time noticed a general impression from the introductory programme alone, as, unlike the BBC, it aimed at a more "adult" audience compared to its competing strand, but planned to give children a more active role in its programming, as evidenced in its preview of Flickwiz and Bubble and Squeak.

The strand was also networked to Associated Television on its Midlands weekday service when upon launch the following year. By April 1956, Bubble and Squeak had moved to Tuesdays (replacing Elizabethan Fanfare), while a new strand was added for Fridays, Friday Fare.

Tea-V Time likely ended as a result of the 1956 ITV cash crisis, which primarily affected the Morning Magazine strand that included Small Time, leading to ITV concentrating its efforts in the post-5pm line-up. The financial situation improved shortly afterwards, which also included the production of new children's programmes. The strand no longer carried the Tea-V Time branding by June 1956.
