= Frisby =

Frisby may refer to:

== People ==
=== Surname ===
- Alfred William Frisby (1897–1973), British colonial administrator
- Almah Jane Frisby (1857–1931), American physician and college professor
- Benjamin Frisby (c. 1852–1936), American doorman, caretaker and collector of turtles at Johns Hopkins Hospital
- Clare Frisby (born 1966), English newsreader
- Cyril Frisby (1885–1961), English soldier awarded the Victoria Cross and later a sports fisherman
- Dominic Frisby (born 1969), British author, comedian and voice actor
- Edgar Frisby (1837–1927), American astronomer
- Joseph Frisby (1908–1977), English cricketer
- Leander F. Frisby (1825–1889), American lawyer, politician and pioneer, 13th attorney general of Wisconsi
- Nick Frisby (born 1982), Australian rugby player
- Richard Frisby (1911–1982), British Army major-general
- Terence Frisby (1932–2020), British playwright

=== Given name ===
- Frisby McCullough (1828–1862), Confederate officer executed during the American Civil War

== Places ==
- Frisby, Leicestershire, England, a village and civil parish
- Frisby on the Wreake, Leicestershire, a village and civil parish
- Frisby and Kirby, Leicestershire, formerly just Frisby, a former civil parish in which Frisby on the Wreake was located
- Frisby, Kentucky, United States, an unincorporated community

== Other uses ==
- Frisby (restaurant), a Colombian fried chicken restaurant
- Mrs. Frisby, a field mouse, title character of the book Mrs. Frisby and the Rats of NIMH
- Frisby, protagonist of "Hocus Pocus and Frisby", a Twilight Zone episode

== See also ==
- The Frisby stereotest, a test for stereopsis
- Frisby v. Schultz, a 1988 United States Supreme Court case
- Frisbee, a toy flying disc
