= Sidney Weintraub (economist, born 1922) =

American economist (1922–2014)

Sidney Weintraub (/ˈwaɪntrɑːb/; 18 May 1922, New York City – 10 April 2014, Cuernavaca, Mexico) was an economist, foreign service officer, professor, non-fiction author, and novelist.

After leaving U.S. government service, he was the Dean Rusk Professor at the University of Texas at Austin, Lyndon B. Johnson School of Public Affairs from 1976 to 1994; emeritus thereafter) and holder of the William E. Simon Chair in Political Economy at the Center for Strategic and International Studies in Washington, D.C., from 1994 to 2011.

== Early life ==
Sidney Weintraub was born 18 May 1922 in New York City to Reuben and Anna (Litwin) Weintraub.

He studied at City College where he obtained a B.B.A. in 1943. He earned his M.A. in journalism at the University of Missouri in 1948 and his M.A. in economics at Yale University in 1958. He obtained his Ph.D. in economics at American University in 1966.

He did his military service in the U.S. Army during World War II, from 1943 to 1946.

== Career ==
Beginning in 1949 he worked for the United States Department of State as a foreign service officer in Madagascar, Mexico, Japan, Thailand, and Chile. In Chile from 1966 to 1969 (during the Christian Democratic presidency of Eduardo Frei), he was simultaneously Economic Counselor of the US Embassy and head of the AID mission.

In the early 1960s Weintraub wrote two thrillers about news hawk Roscoe Barber. In Mexican Slay Ride - set in Mexico where Weintraub had been a diplomat - Barber seeks a woman's killers, eventually uncovering a drug smuggling ring. Reviewing the book in The Saturday Review, "Sergeant Cuff" called the book "Colorful and noisy." In The Siamese Coup Affair, Barber becomes involved in a political assassination and coup d'état.

At the U.S. State Department, Weintraub became the Deputy Assistant Secretary for International Finance and Development from 1969 to 1974. He was the Assistant Administrator of Interagency Development Coordination from 1974 to 1975, and also the executive director of the committee.

From 1976 to 1994 he was the Dean Rusk Professor at the University of Texas at Austin, Lyndon B. Johnson School of Public Affairs. (emeritus after 1994), and was the founding director of the LBJ School's program in U.S.-Mexican policy studies. From 1994 to 2011, he held the William E. Simon Chair in Political Economy at the Center for Strategic and International Studies in Washington, D.C.

He was a senior fellow at the Brookings Institution from 1978 to 1979 and was an international economic consultant from 1981 to 1982. His work on Mexican political economy and U.S.-Mexican relations was influential and, among other things, helped lay the intellectual foundations for the North American Free Trade Agreement (NAFTA). In 2006 the Mexican government awarded him the Order of the Aztec Eagle, the highest decoration granted by Mexico to foreigners.

After 1994 Weintraub remained a member of the advisory board at the Institute of Latin American Studies and Office of Mexican Studies at the University of Texas at Austin. He belonged to the Society for International Development, American Economic Association, and American Foreign Service Association.

== Personal life ==
Weintraub was married to Gladys Katz Weintraub from 11 August 1946 until her death in 2001. They had three children: Jeff (born in New York City), Marcia (born in Tananarive, Madagascar), and Deborah (born in Mexico City). From 2004 until his death he was married to Elizabeth Midgley.

He belonged to the Cosmos Club. Weintraub died April 10, 2014, in Cuernavaca.

== Select publications ==
=== Novels ===
- Mexican Slay Ride. Abelard-Schuman. 1962.
- The Siamese Coup Affair. London: T. V. Boardman. 1963.

=== Non-fiction books ===
- The Foreign Exchange Gap of the Developing Countries. Princeton University Press. 1965.
- Trade Preferences for Less-Developed Countries. Praeger. 1967.
- United States-Latin American Trade and Financial Relations: Some Policy Recommendations. Santiago, Chile: CEPAL. 1977.
- The Government-Private Joint Venture as a Confidence Builder in Non-Fuel Minerals Investment. Austin, Texas: Office for Public Sector Studies, Institute of Latin American Studies, University of Texas at Austin. 1979.
- The Illegal Alien from Mexico: Policy Choices for an Intractable Issue. University of Texas Press. 1980. ISBN 9780292738225.
- (Coauthor with Stanley R. Ross) "Temporary" Alien Workers in the United States: Designing Policy from Fact and Opinion. Boulder, Colorado: Westview Press. 1982.
- Free Trade between Mexico and the United States. Brookings Institution. 1984.
- Industrial Strategy and Planning in Mexico and the United States. Westview Press. 1986. ISBN 9780813372686.
- Mexican Trade Policy and the North American Community. Washington, DC: Center for Strategic and International Studies. 1988.
- NAFTA: What Comes Next?. Westport, Connecticut: Praeger. 1994. (foreword by Paul A. Volcker)
- NAFTA at Three: A Progress Report. Washington, DC: Center for Strategic and International Studies. 1997. (foreword by Julius Katz)
- The Dynamics of Mexican Emigration [La dinamica de la emigracion mexicana]. Mexico: Center for Investigations and Superior Studies in Social Anthropology / Miguel Angel Porrua Editorial Group. 1999.
- (Project co-director with Douglas Johnston) Altering U.S. Sanctions Policy: Final Report of the CSIS Project on Unilateral Economic Sanctions. Washington, DC: Center for Strategic and International Studies. 1999.
- Technical Cooperation Needs for Hemispheric Trade Negotiations. Washington, DC: CIDI. 1999.
- Development and Democracy in the Southern Cone: Imperatives for U.S. Policy in South America. Washington, DC: Center for Strategic and International Studies. 2000.
- Financial Decision-Making in Mexico: To Bet a Nation. Pittsburgh, PA: Pittsburgh. 2000.
- Free Trade in the Americas: Economic and Political Issues for Governance and Firms. Northampton, MA: Edward Elgar. 2004.
- Issues in International Political Economy: Constructive Irreverence. Washington, DC: CSIS. 2004.
- NAFTA's Impact on North America: The First Decade. Washington, DC: CSIS. 2004.
- Energy Cooperation in the Western Hemisphere: Benefits and Impediments. Washington, DC: CSIS. 2007.
- Unequal Partners: The United States and Mexico. Pittsburgh, PA: Pitt Latin American Studies. 2010.

=== Edited ===
- (Coeditor with Norman V. Walbek) Conflict, Order, and Peace in the Americas. Austin, Texas: Lyndon B. Johnson School of Public Affairs, University of Texas. 1978.
- (Editor with William R. Cline) Economic Stabilization Policies in Developing Countries. Brookings Institution. 1981.
- Economic Coercion and U.S. Foreign Policy: Implications of Case Studies from the Johnson Administration. Boulder, Colorado: Westview Press. 1982. ISBN 9780865313255.
- (Coeditor with Sergio Diaz-Briquets) Determinants of Emigration from Mexico, Central America, and the Caribbean. Boulder, Colorado: Westview Press. 1991.
- (Coeditor with Sergio Diaz-Briquets) The Effects of Receiving Country Policies on Migration Flows. Boulder, Colorado: Westview Press. 1991.
- (Coeditor with Sergio Diaz-Briquets) Migration Impacts of Trade and Foreign Investment: Mexico and Caribbean Basin Countries. Boulder, Colorado: Westview Press. 1991.
- (Coeditor with Sergio Diaz-Briquets) Migration, Remittances, and Small Business Development: Mexico and Caribbean Basin Countries. Boulder, Colorado: Westview Press. 1991.
- (Coeditor with Sergio Diaz-Briquets) Regional and Sectoral Development in Mexico as Alternatives to Migration. Boulder, Colorado: Westview Press. 1991.
- (Coeditor with Luis F. Rubio and Alan D. Jones) U.S.-Mexican Industrial Integration: The Road to Free Trade. Boulder, Colorado: Westview Press. 1991.
- (Coeditor with Rafael Fernandez de Castro and Monica Verea Campos) Sectoral Labor Effects of North American Free Trade [TLC, los impactos laborales en sectores clave de las economias]. Austin, Texas: University of Texas at Austin. 1993.
- (Codirector with Chandler Stolp and Leigh Boske) U.S.-Mexican Free Trade: The Effect on Textiles and Apparel, Petrochemicals, and Banking in Texas: A Research Project. Austin, Texas: Lyndon B. Johnson School of Public Affairs, University of Texas at Austin. 1993.
- (Editor) Integrating the Americas: Shaping the Future Trade Policy. New Brunswick, New Jersey: Transaction. 1994.
- (Coeditor with M. Delal Baer) The NAFTA Debate: Grappling with Unconventional Trade Issues. Boulder, Colorado: Lynne Rienner. 1994.
- (Coeditor with Joyce Hoebing and M. Delal Baer) NAFTA and Sovereignty: Trade-Offs for Canada, Mexico, and the United States. Washington, DC: Center for Strategic & International Studies. 1996.
- (Coeditor with Frank D. Bean, Rodolfo de la Garza and Bryan Roberts) At the Crossroads: Mexico and U.S. Immigration Policy. Rowman and Littlefield. 1997.
- (Coeditor with Christopher Sands) The North American Auto Industry under NAFTA. Washington, DC: CSIS Press. 1998. ISBN 9780892063376.
