= Geraldine McInerney =

Irish journalist and continuity announcer

Geraldine McInerney was an Irish journalist and continuity announcer on Raidió Teilifís Éireann (RTÉ), Ireland's national broadcaster, during the early 1970s. She went on to become the first woman to read the news on RTÉ Television in October 1975.

She moved to the United States in the late 1970s, and worked in public relations.Jack Lemmon, Linda Ronstadt, and The Rolling Stones were among some of her clients.

== See also ==
- Barbara Mandell, ITN's first onscreen female newsreader in 1955
- Nan Winton, the BBC's first onscreen newsreader in 1960
