= Appointment with Drama =

1955 British TV anthology drama series

Appointment with Drama is a British anthology series which aired in 1955 on the BBC. Only a single episode is known to survive as a kinescope recording: The Apollo Of Bellac telecast from 12 August 1955. Nevertheless, the program represents an early surviving example of British television drama.
