= The Music Box (TV series) =

1957 British TV comedy series

The Music Box was a 1957 television variety show by Associated-Rediffusion, produced by Jack Hylton. The half-hour (30 minutes with ads, approx 25 minutes without ads) series featured a variety of singers, novelty acts, dancers and musicians. Unlike most programming by Associated-Rediffusion, the series survives in its entirety. It has yet to appear on home video.
