= As I Was Saying =

1955 British TV drama series

As I Was Saying is a British television drama which aired in 1955 on the BBC. Of the six episodes produced, only three survive, but are unavailable for public viewing. Nonetheless, they are some of the earliest surviving examples of episodic British drama by the BBC.
