= Joseph Frisby =

English cricketer

Joseph Brankin Frisby (26 February 1908 – 2 November 1977) was an English cricketer active in 1938 who played for Leicestershire. He was born in Carlton Curlieu and died in Leicester. He appeared in one first-class match as a right-handed batsman who kept wicket. He scored four runs and took three catches.

He was educated at Harrow School.
