= Morning Magazine =

British morning television programme

Morning Magazine was a morning strand on Associated-Rediffusion and was the first regular morning programme on British television. Regular features included Sixpenny Corner, the first daily soap opera in the UK, Small Time, a strand for under-fives, and a variety of lifestyle strands. Due to financial constraints, it ended after a few months on air, with both Sixpenny Corner and Small Time moving to new times.

== Overview and content ==
The first edition was broadcast at 10:45am on 23 September 1955 (A-R went on air the previous evening at 7pm) and ran until 12:30pm throughout its brief run. The programme as a whole was billed as a "special feature for women" introduced by Ken Macleod; Mary Hill was its editor. After the station clock at 10:30am and fifteen minutes of a testing card, the first episode of Sixpenny Corner began, followed by the first edition of Hands About the House, with Elsa Court, the content included a tutorial on how to make a frame for flowers. A further testing card began at 11:15am which was justified by the fact that housewives had to take half an hour off to prepare lunch. When it resumed, the first edition of Book Case followed, where Douglas Warth interviewed US film star Yolande Donlan to present and review her new book Sand in My Mink. At 12pm, an ITN news bulletin was supposed to air, but there was a breakdown, ITV's first. The message "we regret the break in our programme, which will be as short as possible" flashed on screen. Rounding off the inaugural edition was the first episode of Johnny and Flonny on Small Time.

For the first full week of programmes (26–30 September 1955), Morning Magazine consisted of the following:

- Monday 26 September: 10:45am - Sixpenny Corner; 11am - preview of programmes on A-R; 11:04am - Here's Health on diets; 11:15am - test card; 11:45am - Kaye Webb presenting "some incidents from her scrapbook"; 12pm - ITN News and programme schedule; 12:10pm - It's an Idea: Jeanne Kent shows how to make a lampshade; 12:15pm - Big Black Crayon; 12:30pm - closedown.
- Tuesday 27 September: 10:45am - Sixpenny Corner; 11am - No Child is Average presented by Janet Gray, topic of the week being "differences in weight and size between children of the same age"; 11:10am - John Blythe: "are husbands really necessary"; 11:15am - test card; 11:45am - Veronica Laird introduces People Worth Meeting, where a broad spectrum of people came in front of the camera to introduce themselves; 12pm - ITN news and programme schedule; 12:10pm - As Young as You Look with Alisa Garland, programme for older women, topic of the first week being beauty problems; 12:30pm - closedown.
- Wednesday 28 September: 10:45am - Sixpenny Corner; 11am - Between the Lines, talking about handwriting with an expert; 11:15am - test card; 11:45am - To Make Your Mouth Water, recipes with Dione Lucas; 12pm - ITN news and programme schedule; 12:10pm - Treasure Trove, Alfred Foulks and Bohemian glass; 12:15pm - Toybox; 12:30pm - closedown.
- Thursday 29 September: 10:45am - Sixpenny Corner; 11am - Design for Living (admag); 11:15am - test card; 11:45am - Homes of Today, housing, mostly with architects; 12pm - ITN News and programme schedule; 12:10pm - Young at Heart, variety for over-60s; 12:30pm - closedown.
- Friday 30 September: 10:45am - Sixpenny Corner; 11am - Pop Goes the Weasel, shopping tips with Celia Irving, the aim of the programme was to cater to budget-conscious housewives; 11:15am - test card; 11:45am - The Other Screen, film reviews with Siriol Hugh Jones; 12pm - ITN News and programme schedule, 12:10pm - Friday's Man, appointment with a given personality; 12:15pm - Johnny and Flonny; 12:30pm - closedown.

By November, the half-hour break was suppressed.

Morning Magazine only lasted a few months since the earliest ITV companies invested heavily in morning programmes, which, at the time, had fewer advertisers and, in turn, were not financially attractive to sustain the cost. In the aftermath, Small Time moved the teatime children's slot and Sixpenny Corner moved to a near-peak time evening slot. The airtime used for this programme would later be used for ITV Schools beginning in 1957; regular daytime programming would not return until the early 1970s.
