= The Granville Melodramas =

British TV drama series (1955–1956)

The Granville Melodramas is a British television series which aired from 1955 to 1956. Cast included John Bailey, Erik Chitty, Victoria Grayson, Hattie Jacques, and Helen Shingler. It was a drama produced by Associated-Rediffusion Television.

The series is missing from the archives.
