= Asgar (stylist) =

British hair stylist

- Born: 19 June 1955 (age 70)
- Occupation: Hair stylist

Asgar (born 19 June 1955) has been a celebrity hair stylist since 1981 and regular columnist in the weekly national British newspaper Eastern Eye ("Hair Care with Asgar") since 2005. Asgar has done the hairstyling for covers and fashion features in Harper's Bazaar, Vogue, Tatler, The Observer, The Times, The Independent, The Guardian, The Daily Telegraph, Daily Mail, Asiana Magazine, Good Housekeeping, Asian Women, and Asian Groom and Man.

Asgar has done work for TV, cinema, and fashion shows. Some of the celebrities Asgar has styled include:

- Madeleine Albright
- Joan Collins
- Cindy Crawford
- Ben Cross (Chariots of Fire)
- Karisma Kapoor
- Shah Rukh Khan
- Nicole Kidman
- Akshay Kumar
- Deepika Padukone
- Gwyneth Paltrow
- Aishwarya Rai
- Rekha
- Hrithik Roshan
- Twiggy

According to the newspaper, Eastern Eye, Asgar also styles the "Asian Rich List," including the Madhvhani family, the Jatania family, Lord Noon, and Lady Paul.
