= Take Your Pick! =

British radio and TV game show (1952–1968, 1992–1999)

- Genre: Game show
- Created by: Michael Miles
- Presented by: Michael Miles (1955–68); Des O'Connor (1992–99)
- Starring: Jodie Wilson (1992); Gayle and Gillian Blakeney (1994); Sarah Matravers (1996); Sasha Lawrence (1998–99)
- Voices of: Bob Danvers-Walker (1955–68); John Sachs (1992); Steve Jones (1994–99)
- Country of origin: United Kingdom
- Original language: English
- No. of series: 13 (Associated-Rediffusion); 5 (Thames)
- No. of episodes: 494 (Associated-Rediffusion); 74 (Thames)

Production
- Production locations: Wembley Studios (1955–68); Teddington Studios (1992–99)
- Running time: 30 minutes (inc. adverts)
- Production companies: Associated-Rediffusion (1955–68); Thames for Central (1992–99)

Original release
- Network: ITV
- Release: 23 September 1955 – 26 July 1968
- Release: 24 February 1992 – 23 December 1999

Take Your Pick! is a British game show originally broadcast by Radio Luxembourg starting in 1952. The show was transferred to television in 1955, one day after the launch of ITV, where it continued until 1968. It was the first game show broadcast in the UK to offer cash prizes.

The programme was later revived from 24 February 1992 to 23 December 1999. The show featured female assistants to accompany Des O'Connor. They were Jodie Wilson in the first two of the revived series, then Gayle and Gillian Blakeney in 1994, followed by Sarah Matravers (1996) and Sasha Lawrence in 1998.

== History ==
Take Your Pick! host Michael Miles.

The first version of the television show was produced by Associated-Rediffusion (later Rediffusion London), while the revival was made by Thames Television, whose arrival as the new London weekday ITV company had led to the demise of the original show.

During the gameplay, contestants would answer a series of questions without using the words yes or no in what was known as the "Yes-No Interlude". If they inadvertently used a 'yes' or a 'no' in answering a question, they would be gonged off the stage. If successful, however, contestants would answer more questions to win modest monetary prizes. At the climax of the show, contestants would be offered the choice to either keep all the money they had earned or trade it for a mystery prize contained in a box. The prize could be something valuable such as a holiday or a washing machine, or a booby prize such as a mousetrap or a bag of sweets.

The first version was hosted by Michael Miles. After its demise, Miles hosted a similar show for Southern Television called Wheel of Fortune, not to be confused with the later Wheel of Fortune of the same title. Bob Danvers-Walker, who was the voice of Pathé News from 1940 until its demise in 1970, was the show's announcer. Alec Dane was on hand to bang the gong. Harold Smart was at the electronic organ. A similar formula was used for Pot of Gold, another game show hosted by O'Connor.

Singer and television personality Des O'Connor became the host for the second version, which aired from 1992 to 1999. His future wife, Australian born Jodie Wilson, was one of the hostesses; she would later be replaced by former Neighbours twins Gayle and Gillian Blakeney, also from Australia.

A one-off revival was broadcast in 2005 as part of Ant & Dec's Gameshow Marathon, a celebrity game show tournament produced as part of commemorations of ITV's 50th anniversary. Another one-off revival was broadcast as part of the similar 2020 ITV series Alan Carr's Epic Gameshow. filmed at Dock10 studios. This version added a bonus round, where one of the contestants would select boxes from rows of a pyramid, and could risk their prizes for a chance at a major prize inside one of two "golden boxes" placed at the top of the pyramid.

== Gameplay ==
=== Yes-No interlude ===
In this opening game, the host asked the contestant a series of questions in a 60-second span. Contestants were not permitted to say "yes" or "no", nor could they nod or shake their heads. If they did, the co-host would bang the gong and the next contestant would be introduced. Those completing the minute successfully were awarded 5 shillings (25p). In the 1992–1999 version they were awarded £1 a second.

=== Box numbers and the prizes ===
There were 10 boxes numbered from 1 to 10. Three of them would contain booby prizes (e.g. a cucumber or an odd sock), one would contain a card awarding a star prize (e.g., a small car or holiday package), and six would contain cards announcing other prizes (e.g., appliances, furniture, or a "treasure chest" of cash (£80 in the Miles series, £500 in the first O'Connor series, £1,000 for the remaining series). No-one, including the host, knew which prize was in each box. However, the audience was given a preview of the actual prizes, shown on screen, and listed by Bob Danvers-Walker, from off-screen. The list always culminated in the announcement of "tonight's star prize".

Contestants would be asked general-knowledge questions. If they answered three out of four questions correctly, they picked a key from a set of ten, corresponding to one of the first ten boxes. The host would then try to buy back the key with increasing amounts of cash, up to about £50 (or, in the revival, several hundred pounds). One box also contained a key to "Box 13," which could hold either a valuable item or a booby prize. The host would make a new offer to buy back both that key and the prize in the chosen box; if the contestant turned it down, they had to decide between taking the prize or whatever was in Box 13. In the O'Connor version of the show, the contents of Box 13 would usually be a visual clue to the actual prize, which was often a holiday.

== International version ==
A Portuguese adaptation based on the 1992–98 version called A Amiga Olga! (My Friend Olga!) presented by Olga Cardoso aired on TVI from 1993 until 1994. Additionally, this was Cardoso's first debut on television.

== Cultural references ==
A sketch in Monty Python's Flying Circus (called "Spot the Brain Cell" in a later audio version) features John Cleese portraying a wildly exaggerated version of Michael Miles. One contestant opts to play for a blow on the head and, after rejecting several offered "prizes" that are actually forms of physical abuse, receives it in the form of being hit over the head with a giant mallet. An early version of this sketch appeared in At Last the 1948 Show. For a time, after Miles' death, the sketch was not shown by the BBC, but it has since been reinstated.

Also, in the Dirty Hungarian Phrasebook sketch in Monty Python's Flying Circus, a prosecutor (played by Eric Idle) plays the game with Alexander Yalt (played by Michael Palin). The prosecutor manages to gong Yalt "out" for answering a question with "yes" (although Yalt was probably unaware of playing the game in the first place).

A sketch in the BBC Radio comedy series The Burkiss Way featured a "Dinosaur-Cheese Interlude", in which contestants were required to answer questions without mentioning any species of dinosaur or any variety of cheese. Naturally, all the contestants did accidentally mention them. The sketch was resurrected in an episode of The Kenny Everett Television Show (which shared the same scriptwriters).

A fifth-season episode of the radio show Hancock's Half Hour (broadcast May 1958) had Tony Hancock appear on the (unnamed) show and win £4,000.

The British progressive rock band Hatfield and the North named one of their songs "The Yes No Interlude". It is included in their second LP, The Rotters' Club. Also the song "Fitter Stoke has a bath" on the same LP, contains the lyrics "Michael Miles, bogey man".

The 1970s radio programme I'm Sorry, I'll Read That Again made frequent references to Take Your Pick! with phrases such as (in this case, apropos of a vampire rabbit and its coffin): "Stake the bunny!" "Hop in the box!"

== Transmissions ==
=== Associated-Rediffusion ===
Series	Start date	End date	Episodes
1	23 September 1955	1 June 1956	36
2	21 September 1956	14 June 1957	39
3	20 September 1957	13 June 1958	39
4	19 September 1958	26 June 1959	41
5	18 September 1959	10 June 1960	39
6	16 September 1960	23 June 1961	41
7	15 September 1961	8 June 1962	39
8	14 September 1962	7 June 1963	39
9	13 September 1963	5 June 1964	39
10	18 September 1964	11 June 1965	39
11	24 September 1965	18 March 1966	26
12	30 September 1966	12 May 1967	33
13	29 September 1967	26 July 1968	44

=== Thames ===
Series 1 and 2 were commissioned and produced by Thames. After Thames lost its ITV franchise, the remaining series were commissioned by Central and produced by Thames.

Series	Start date	End date	Episodes
1	24 February 1992	11 May 1992	10
2	8 July 1992	23 September 1992	12
3	12 July 1994	23 November 1994	20
4	13 May 1996	26 August 1996	16
5	5 June 1998	23 December 1999	16
