= Phil Sawdon =

Phil Sawdon (born 1955) is an artist, writer and academic.

== Career ==
Sawdon works primarily within the field of contemporary drawing research. With Jane Tormey, Sawdon co-founded the international, on-line journal for drawing and visualisation, TRACEY and he is now a Director of the TRACEY research project. With TRACEY, Sawdon has co-edited two books on contemporary drawing, Drawing Now: Between the Lines of Contemporary Art (2007) and Hyperdrawing (2011) and with Leo Duff, the volume Drawing - The Purpose (2008).

After studying Town and Country Planning at the University of Manchester (1973), Sawdon completed a BA (Hons) in Ceramics at Bristol Polytechnic (now University of the West of England) in 1979 and began lecturing at Loughborough College of Art (now the School of the Arts, English and Drama at Loughborough University) in 1981. He completed his master's in art and design at Leeds Metropolitan University in 1993.

Sawdon was a member of the UK’s National Association of Ceramics in Higher Education (NACHE), by whom he was invited onto the organising committee of association’s second triennial exhibition Ceramic Contemporaries 2, chaired by Jane Gibson (1996). Sawdon was later invited to Chair Ceramic Contemporaries 3 (1999–2000) which opened at the Royal College of Art, touring to Stoke (Potteries Museum & Art Gallery), Belfast (Ormeau Baths Gallery), Bideford (Bideford Art Gallery and Museum) and, finally, Edinburgh (City Art Centre). In 2000, Sawdon worked with the Touring Exhibitions Group (TEG) and Visiting Arts to develop a directory of European gateway organisations for exhibition exchange and collaboration, One Thing Leads To Another: European Touring Networks For The Visual Arts (2000).

Presently, Sawdon co-edits (with Marsha Meskimmon) the Literature/Creative Text section of the online magazine Stimulus Respond and he works in collaboration with Deborah Harty as humhyphenhum whose work was featured in Animation in Process by Andrew Selby (2009). Some of his publications can be viewed in the Loughborough University Institutional Repository LUIR (Sawdon was awarded an Honorary Fellowship in the School of the Arts, English and Drama at Loughborough University in 2011) and in the online publications slash seconds, soanyway and Nyx a noctournal.

== Bibliography ==
- TRACEY (author), P.J. Sawdon, C.J. Tormey, S.T. Downs, A. Selby and R. Marshall (editors). Drawing Now: Between the Lines of Contemporary Art. London: I. B. Tauris, 2007. ISBN 978-1-84511-533-3
- P.J. Sawdon; R. Marshall. Hyperdrawing. London: I.B. Tauris, 2011. ISBN ???
- Leo Duff and P.J. Sawdon (editors). Drawing - The Purpose. Bristol and Chicago, IL: Intellect and University of Chicago Press, 2008. ISBN 978-1-84150-201-4
