= Double Your Money =

British quiz show

- Genre: Game show
- Presented by: Hughie Green
- Country of origin: United Kingdom
- Original language: English
- No. of series: 13
- No. of episodes: 480

Production
- Production location: Wembley Studios
- Running time: 30 minutes (inc. adverts)
- Production company: Associated-Rediffusion

Original release
- Network: ITV
- Release: 26 September 1955 – 22 July 1968

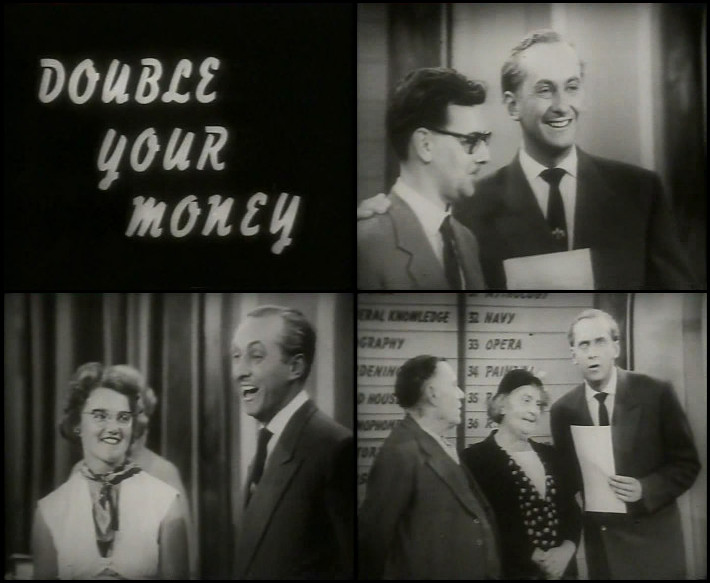
Hughie Green presenting the first episode of Double Your Money.

Double Your Money was a British game show hosted by Hughie Green. Originally broadcast on Radio Luxembourg since 1950 and based on the American radio quiz Take It Or Leave It (1940–1947), it transferred to ITV in September 1955, a few days after the commercial channel began broadcasting. It was produced by Associated-Rediffusion until 1964 and then by Rediffusion London and it finished in 1968 when the company lost its franchise.

Throughout its run the show was one of the most consistently popular programmes on British television. The quiz format was similar to The $64,000 Question, with prize money doubling at each question from £1 to a guarantee of £32 and multi-part answers being required at the harder stages. When contestants correctly answer a three-part question to reach the £1,000 Treasure Trail, they were placed in sound-proofed 'isolation booths', where the fans were turned off and the temperature grew, making contestants sweat and look nervous. The £64 question required two correct answers and the £128 question featured three parts. The remaining questions featured a four-part question for £256, a five-part question for £512 and a six-part question for the top prize of £1,000 (£1,024 at first). Only one contestant at a time could play the Treasure Trail.

The 8 November 1966 (air date) show came from The House of Friendship, Moscow, Russia, where Monica Rose and Natasha Vasylyeva were both hostesses and, because the Communist Party would not allow money to be given away, the big prize was a television set. For this edition of the show, its title was changed to Do You Want to Go On?

Female hostesses on the show included 18-year-old Valerie Drew and an elderly cleaner named Alice Earley who was taken on by Green after first appearing as a contestant. Nancy Roberts (1961–1965), Julie de Marco (1963–1965), Audrey Graham (1966-1968) and Monica Rose (1963–1968), a former accounts clerk from White City, London, a chirpy and popular teenage contestant who was also recruited by Green. She went on to host his next show The Sky's the Limit.

A feature of later shows was a section called "Beat Blackman" where viewers challenged previous contestant Roy Blackman on obscure sport trivia such as naming entire football squads in specific games, prompting Green to ask: "Who painted the goalposts?".

== Transmissions ==
Series	Start date	End date	Episodes
1	26 September 1955	6 June 1956	32
2	19 September 1956	12 June 1957	39
3	19 September 1957	12 June 1958	39
4	18 September 1958	25 June 1959	41
5	14 September 1959	20 June 1960	40
6	15 September 1960	8 June 1961	39
7	14 September 1961	7 June 1962	39
8	13 September 1962	6 June 1963	39
9	12 September 1963	4 June 1964	39
10	17 September 1964	10 June 1965	32
11	14 September 1965	7 June 1966	39
12	27 September 1966	2 May 1967	32
13	1 January 1968	22 July 1968	30
