= Associated-Rediffusion =

Former ITV weekday service for London

Associated-Rediffusion Rediffusion London
- Logo from 1964

- The Rediffusion region when it lost its franchise in 1968
- Type: Region of television network
- Branding: Associated-Rediffusion (1955–1964); Rediffusion London (1964–1968)
- Country: UK
- First air date: 22 September 1955; 71 years ago
- Founded: 1955
- TV transmitters: Croydon
- Headquarters: Television House, London
- Broadcast area: London, Greater London
- Owner: BET plc (Rediffusion)
- Dissolved: 29 July 1968; 58 years ago (after 12 years, 311 days)
- Picture format: 405-line black and white
- Affiliation: ITV
- Language: English
- Replaced by: Thames Television

Associated-Rediffusion, later Rediffusion London, was the British ITV franchise holder for London and parts of the surrounding counties, on weekdays between 22 September 1955 and 29 July 1968. It was the first ITA franchisee to go on air, and one of the "Big Four" companies that between them produced the majority of ITV networked programmes during this period.

Rediffusion lost its franchise in 1968 but merged with another franchisee to form Thames Television, which continued to hold the London weekday franchise for another 24 years.

== History ==
=== Formation ===
Associated-Rediffusion Television was originally a partnership between British Electric Traction (BET), its subsidiary Broadcast Relay Services Ltd. (trading as Rediffusion), and Associated Newspapers, owner of the Daily Mail, which had been interested in commercial broadcasting as early as the 1920s. In the aftermath of the heavy financial losses made by the new ITV system in its initial years, Associated Newspapers sold the majority of its share to BET and Rediffusion, although the company did not drop the word "Associated" from its name until 1964. Associated Newspapers, later realising the potential of ITV, was a significant investor in the ITV franchise contractor for southern and south-east England, Southern Television and, much later, became a shareholder in Westcountry Television and Independent Television News.

Thomas Brownrigg, the general manager of Associated-Rediffusion from 1955, had a very clear idea of what his new commercial television station was to be like – the BBC Television Service, with advertisements. To this end, the station had a heraldic-style on-air clock, referred to as "Mitch" by staff (after chief station announcer Leslie Mitchell, who had not only made the first announcement when A-R went on the air in 1955, but had done the same when the BBC TV service started in 1936).

Associated-Rediffusion took over the former Wembley Film Studio at Wembley Park in Middlesex. Associated-Rediffusion officially began broadcasting on 22 September 1955 at 19:15, with actress Marjie Lawrence uttering the first words. That night the BBC, which had held the monopoly on broadcasting in the UK, aired a melodramatic episode of their popular radio soap opera The Archers on the BBC Home Service in which core character Grace Archer was fatally injured in a fire. This was seen as a desperate, and rather underhand, ploy to lure as much of the potential audience as possible from tuning in to the new station's opening night of broadcast entertainment. Britain's first female newsreader Barbara Mandell appeared during the first full day of transmissions on 23 September 1955. The London weekend contractor ATV launched two days later.

This strategy was intended to allay fears that the new service would be aimed at the bottom of the market. Associated-Rediffusion sought to make ITV respectable. It did introduce popular game shows, but also provided quality programming across all genres gaining large audiences both in its own London area and, as the ITV network grew, for its programmes shown across the country.

Boris Ford became Associated-Rediffusion's first head of schools broadcasting (1957–58), during which time he persuaded Benjamin Britten to compose his church opera Noye's Fludde for a series of programmes. Ford was dismissed before the opera was produced, allegedly for administrative shortcomings and inexperience. However, A-R continued its association with Britten, producing a highly successful telecast of his opera The Turn of the Screw in 1959.

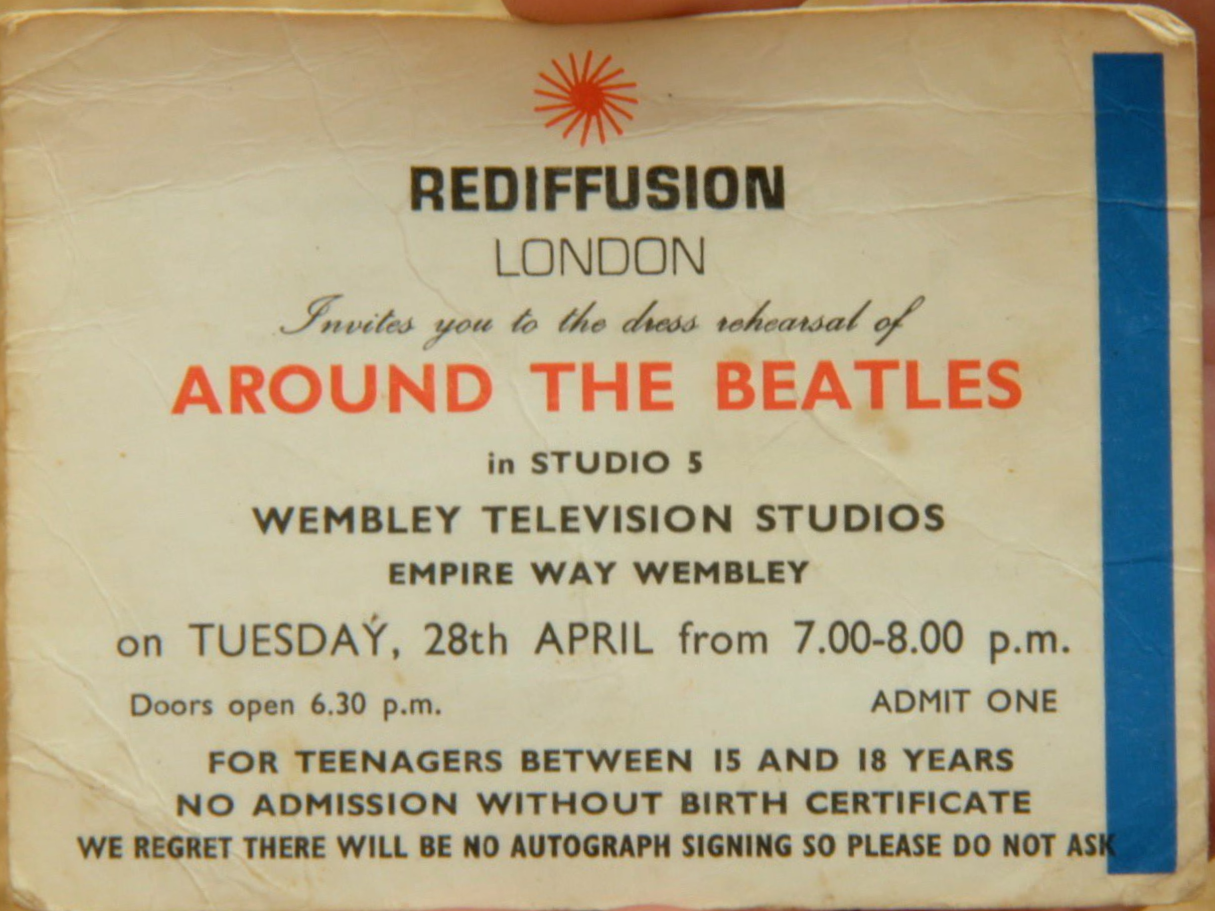
Ticket for the dress rehearsal for 'Around the Beatles', on 28 April 1964, at Wembley Park

Associated-Rediffusion added new television studios at Wembley Park in 1960. Their size and design attracted attention. During the 1960s, the studios were home to some of the most popular programmes on the ITV network, including The Rat Catchers, Blackmail, At Last, The 1948 Show and No Hiding Place. The Beatles appeared at the studios on more than one occasion.

=== Rebranding and loss of franchise ===
In 1964, the company simplified its name to Rediffusion Television and rebranded the station on screen as "Rediffusion London", with a very hip 1960s style, the face of Swinging London in the shiny prosperous new Britain. However, the new Rediffusion did not survive for long – in October 1967 the Independent Television Authority announced to the company's shock that there was no place for Rediffusion in the redrawn franchise pattern. Following changes to the ITV network structure, which resulted in the abandonment of the Midlands and North weekend franchises held by ABC Weekend TV, ABC lost all its franchises along with the rights to take over the Midlands, held by ATV, or the London weekend franchise, awarded to the London Television Consortium. To preserve the sizeable ABC, the ITA proposed ABC and Rediffusion should form a new company: Thames Television. This was not a formal merger of the companies, but an amalgamation of their television interests. ABPC, the parent company of ABC, and BET, the parent company of Rediffusion, created Thames as a separate entity. Thames would use the resources and staff of ABC's Teddington Studios and Rediffusion's Television House. Rediffusion's parent company, BET, took a 49% stake in Thames, and was under-represented in the management of the new company – a state of affairs to which Rediffusion strongly objected. The ITA replied that either Thames took the new contract, or ABC took over. Rediffusion chose the former and went off the air on 29 July 1968 at 12:26 am. Employees based at Wembley went to work for London Weekend Television whilst those at Television House were employed by Thames. Some managerial and presentation staff re-located to the new Yorkshire Television in Leeds.

Much of Rediffusion's programme library was either lost or destroyed following the creation of Thames. Surviving titles from the Rediffusion archive are held by the BFI National Archive at Berkhamsted, Hertfordshire. Most titles are the intellectual property of Archbuild Limited, with the exception of some of Rediffusion's musical output such as Ready Steady Go! which was for a long time owned by Dave Clark International, and latterly by BMG Rights Management. Some Rediffusion shows have been rediscovered in recent years. In the late 1980s, a series of five At Last the 1948 Show compilations was found in the archives of Swedish broadcaster, SVT. In 2020 The British Film Institute released the most complete box set possible of the restored series, including all ten surviving episodes, two almost completely reconstructed episodes, and the complete audio of a further episode with fragments of film. In 2022 the BFI through an agreement with Archbuild Limited became the exclusive worldwide sales agent for the Associated-Rediffusion television catalogue and have since started releasing surviving material on DVD and Blu-ray, such as Object Z in 2025.

=== Revival ===
In the 1990s, the name "Associated-Rediffusion Television" and the adastral trademark were acquired by British journalist Victor Lewis-Smith, and were used by his own production company. Productions included:

- TV Offal, a satirical series of TV archive clips presented by Lewis-Smith
- Ads Infinitum, a retrospective of vintage television advertising presented by Lewis-Smith over two series
- An Omnibus documentary covering Dudley Moore's love for music and his struggle with progressive supranuclear palsy, titled "Dudley Moore: After The Laughter". It turned out to be Moore's final interview for television and won a BAFTA Television Award in 2001.
- A one-off revival of Dee Time
- A series of documentaries presented by actor Keith Allen
- 21st Century Bach, a long-running series of programmes no more than ten minutes in length, each featuring short pieces of organ music by J.S. Bach and played by John Scott Whiteley
- Alchemists of Sound, a documentary about the BBC Radiophonic Workshop
- The Undiscovered Tony Hancock, a 2018 documentary for Sky Arts

=== Reditune and Rediffusion Music ===
Rediffusion Music, Reditune Rediffusion, Reditune Music and Rediffusion Thorsen (Germany) were sold to AEI Music Network of Seattle, WA in 1996. DMX Music, a smaller music provider, bought AEI Music in 2000. Mood Media bought DMX Music in 2005. The current owner remains Mood Media; however, it trades under the MOOD: brand today. Mood Media Corporation own the previous trading names of Rediffusion Reditune, Rediffusion Music, AEI Rediffusion Music, AEI Music and DMX Music.

== Studios ==
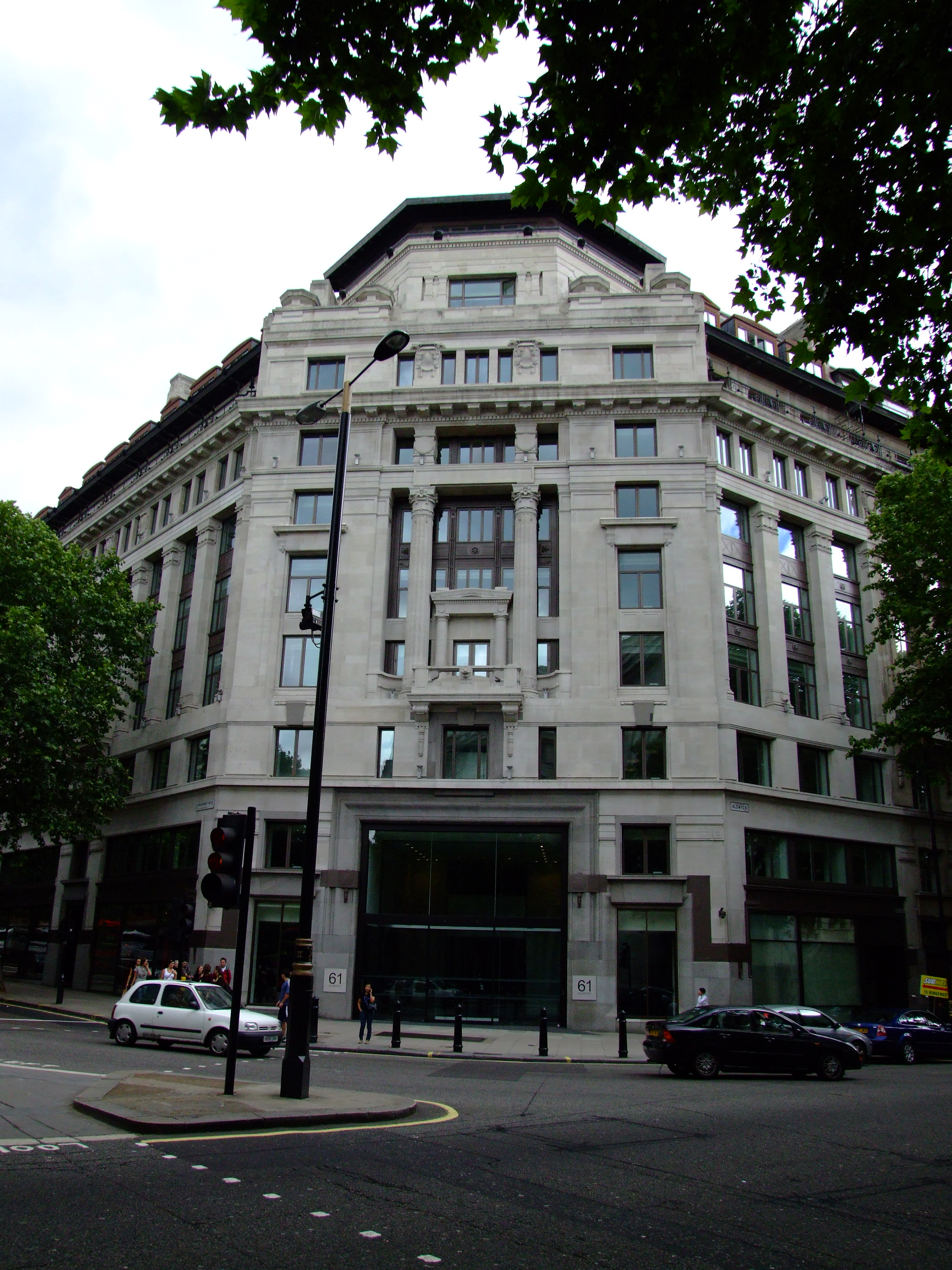
Television House, Rediffusion's headquarters.

The company's administrative headquarters and transmission facilities were at Television House in Kingsway, London. Most programmes were produced at Wembley Studios in Wembley Park, north-west London. However, a small basement studio at Television House, Studio 9, was occasionally used for current affairs programmes and was home to Ready Steady Go! during its first few years.

Television House had been known as Adastral House when it was the headquarters of the Air Ministry. This gave its name to A-R's logo, the 16-point Adastral Star, which appeared not only at the start and end of each commercial break but also between each advertisement. (The motto of the Royal Air Force is "per ardua, ad astra" - "through adversity to the stars".) The station's archives were also kept at these properties, with the original programme library situated on the roof of Television House with some storage in the film vaults at Wembley Studios.

Following Rediffusion's loss of franchise and the creation of Thames Television, the Wembley studios were leased to the newly formed London Weekend Television by order of the ITA, and the company officially took control of the premises on Monday 6 May 1968 for a contractual minimum term of three years. London Weekend Television subsequently vacated the studios in the late summer of 1972.

Somewhat confusingly, this Wembley studios site is the very same studio buildings site that would later be sold-off, renamed, re-purposed as film studios, then back to television studios, at various stages when used by later owners; London Weekend Television (Wembley), Lee International Studios (Wembley), Limehouse Television (Wembley), Fountain Television, before closing in 2018, and becoming a theatre space, prior to the site's planned redevelopment from 2019.

Television House was used as Thames' headquarters until their Euston Road studios were built in 1970 and was subsequently sold off.

== Presentation ==
When Rediffusion originally launched, as Associated-Rediffusion, presentation consisted of a simple animated ident, featuring the station name, and a spinning star called the Adastral. This first ident was accompanied by a five note electronic fanfare, achieved by tapping out the morse code for 'A-R'. To accompany the ident, a timepiece was created based on a heraldic coat of arms and nicknamed 'Mitch' after Head of Presentation Leslie Mitchell.

In 1964, Associated-Rediffusion rebranded itself on screen as Rediffusion London, using a black and grey ident featuring the same spinning star as previous, but with the new name now in a stripe and in a sans serif font. A new seven note strident theme was adopted to replace the original fanfare, and a new and simpler clock was designed featuring a 24-hour display at the bottom of the face and an adastral at the centre. The original timepiece 'Mitch' was given to the Science Museum, where it became the first ITV exhibit, and now resides in the National Media Museum, Bradford.

Rediffusion used a number of continuity announcers throughout its 13 years on air, with Redvers Kyle and Muriel Young being the most recognised.

== Programmes ==
Rediffusion was among the "Big Four" franchises that provided much of the ITV schedule. Programmes produced by or for Associated-Rediffusion and Rediffusion include:

- Alfred Marks Time
- At Last the 1948 Show
- Badger's Bend
- The Barnstormers
- The Blackness
- Boyd Q.C.
- A Choice of Kings
- The Citadel
- Crane
- The Devil in the Fog
- Do Not Adjust Your Set
- Double Your Money
- East End, West End
- Five O'Clock Club
- Francis Storm Investigates
- The Gay Cavalier
- Gert and Daisy
- The Granville Melodramas
- HMS Paradise
- The Idiot Weekly, Price 2d
- The Informer
- Living It Up
- Love and Kisses
- A Man of Our Times
- Morning Magazine
- The Music Box
- My Husband and I
- No Hiding Place
- No – That's Me Over Here!
- Object Z
- Opportunity Knocks
- Orlando
- Our Man at St. Mark's
- Out of Step
- Play of the Week
- Playhouse
- The Rat Catchers
- Ready Steady Go!
- Riviera Police
- The Ronnie Barker Playhouse
- Sara and Hoppity
- Send Foster
- Sexton Blake
- Shadow Squad
- A Show Called Fred
- Sierra Nine
- Sixpenny Corner
- Small Time
- Something in the City
- Son of Fred
- Stars and Garters
- Take Your Pick!
- Tales of Mystery
- Tea-V Time
- Tell It to the Marines
- This Week
- Together Again
- The Tony Hancock Show
- Top Secret
- Tuesday Rendezvous

Most of the surviving archive is now held by Archbuild and it has never been officially confirmed exactly how large the surviving archive actually is.

== See also ==
- Victor Lewis-Smith, one-time owner of the brand Associated Rediffusion Productions Limited.

ITV regional service
New service	London (weekdays); 22 September 1955 – 29 July 1968	Succeeded by Thames Television
