= Rodolfo de la Garza =

American political scientist (1942–2018)

Rodolfo O. de la Garza (August 17, 1942 – August 5, 2018) was an American political scientist.

De la Garza was born in Tucson, Arizona, on August 17, 1942. He attended Tucson High School, graduating in 1960 and earned a doctorate from the University of Arizona in 1972. He then worked for the United States Agency for International Development in South America. De la Garza began his teaching career at the University of Texas at El Paso, and later moved to the University of Texas at Austin, where he was Mike Hogg Professor of Community Affairs. In 2001, de la Garza joined the Columbia University faculty. At Columbia, he was appointed Eaton Professor of Administrative Law and Municipal Science. De la Garza died in New York City on August 5, 2018.
