= Barbara Mandell =

British broadcaster & newsreader

- Born: Allada Barbara Grenville Wells; 15 July 1920; London, United Kingdom
- Died: 25 August 1998 (aged 78); Holsworthy, Devon, England
- Occupations: Radio and television journalist, newsreader, travel writer
- Notable credit: ITN News (1955–1980)
- Spouse: Alan Dell (1945–1955: divorced)
- Partner: Martin Gray (?–1996: his death)

Allada Barbara Grenville Wells (15 July 1920 – 25 August 1998), known professionally as Barbara Mandell, was a British journalist, broadcaster, newsreader and travel writer. She became the United Kingdom's first female newsreader after she was recruited to present the Midday News on the newly launched Independent Television in 1955.

== Life and career ==
Mandell was born in London, England, daughter of Royal Navy Lieutenant-Commander Yvo Hedworth Fortescue Grenville Wells, later deputy editor of The Rand Daily Mail, and Clara Isabella, daughter of Henry Wheaton, of The Abbey, Cambridge. The Wells family were shipbuilders who rose to the rank of landed gentry, owning Bickley Hall, Kent and Holmewood, Huntingdonshire until selling them during the nineteenth century. Yvo Wells was a maternal grandson of Sir John Croft, 2nd Baronet, and on his father's side a great-grandson of the politician William Jolliffe, 1st Baron Hylton and a descendant of the Barons Cottesloe and Earls of Carysfort. Mandell was the oldest of two daughters in the family.

She was raised in South Africa after her family relocated to that country in 1924 when her mother was diagnosed with tuberculosis. Her father was the deputy editor of South Africa's Rand Daily Mail and Mandell followed him into journalism, working for the same newspaper. She later worked for the South African Broadcasting Company (SABC) as a radio news editor, but subsequently returned to the United Kingdom in the early 1950s after a brief stay in the United States. After working for the BBC's Television Newsreel as a script editor she joined ITV upon its launch in 1955, and was one of three people chosen to present its news bulletins.

The independent broadcaster's news strand, ITN was keen to set itself apart from the rival BBC. For the first time news bulletins were written and read by onscreen presenters, as opposed to the BBC's then preferred method of showing news footage with a voiceover. Mandell was selected from 150 candidates along with former Olympic runner Christopher Chataway and journalist Robin Day to read news bulletins, and she presented the Midday News. She made her first on-screen appearance as a television newsreader on 23 September 1955. Mandell was one of two female reporters to work for ITN in its early days (the other being Lynne Reid Banks), and helped to pioneer the use of so-called Vox pop reports in the United Kingdom – whereby one conducts interviews with ordinary members of the public in the street.

Although Mandell was the UK's first regular female television news presenter, her tenure lasted only six months. By January 1956 ITV was experiencing financial difficulties, and the budget for its news strand was reduced, meaning the Midday News was dropped. However, Mandell continued to be seen on screen throughout the 1950s, usually fronting weekend news bulletins, and she was a regular reporter. Then later in her career she returned to scriptwriting, and ended her career as Chief Copyeditor of the weekday early evening News at 5.45 bulletin before retiring in September 1980.

Following her retirement she moved to Luxembourg with her partner where she wrote travel books to European countries. She later returned to Devon, and died in hospital in Holsworthy, Devon on 25 August 1998.

== Personal life ==
She met Alan Mandell (better known as broadcaster Alan Dell) while working for SABC, and the couple were married in 1945. However, they were divorced a decade later. She later met ITN cameraman Martin Gray with whom she lived until his death in 1996.

== See also ==
- Nan Winton, the BBC's first female newsreader in 1960
- Geraldine McInerney, RTÉ's first female newsreader in 1975
