= Lightvessel stations of Great Britain =

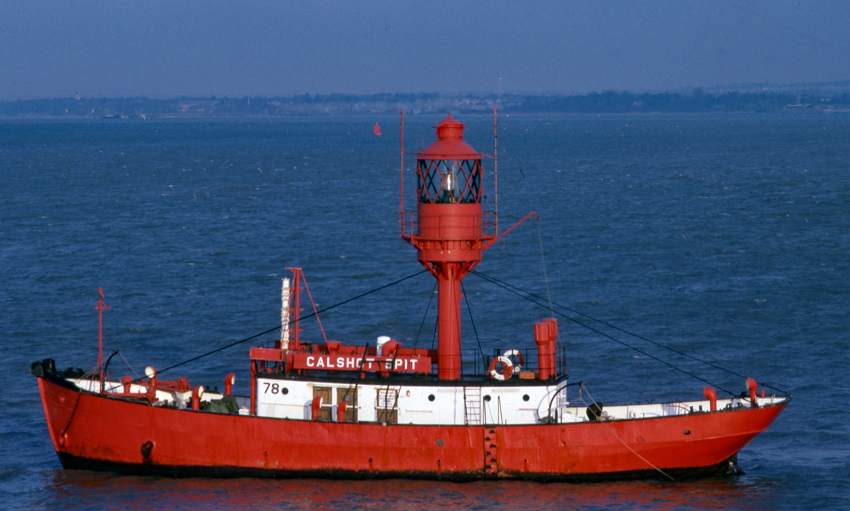
Light vessel 78 Calshot Spit on station in 1979

The history of the many lightvessel stations of Great Britain goes back over 250 years to the placement of the world's first lightship at the Nore in the early 18th century.

A lightvessel station is a named position at which a lightvessel was placed, rather than a particular ship; individual vessels were often transferred between different stations during their existence. Stations themselves were occasionally changed, especially during wartime, when lights were only displayed in response to specific shipping needs.

== History ==
The world's first lightvessel was the result of a business partnership between Robert Hamblin, a former barber and ship manager from King's Lynn, and David Avery, an investor. In 1730 the pair secured a government licence to moor a ship, with a prominent light affixed to it, to serve as a navigation aid at the Nore in the Thames mouth. Hamblin and Avery intended to profit from the vessel by collecting a fee from passing merchant vessels. The licence was opposed by Trinity House, which considered that it possessed a monopoly on construction and maintenance of navigation aids in British waters. After extensive legal dispute the licence was revoked in 1732 and Trinity House assumed direct responsibility for the proposed lightship; Hamblin and Avery were granted nominal lease revenues in exchange. The Nore lightship commenced operations in 1734.

A second lightvessel was placed at the Dudgeon station, off the Norfolk coast, in 1736, with others following at Owers Bank (1788) and the Goodwin Sands (1793). While the Admiralty opposed the 1802 Sunk lightvessel, claiming it would aid enemy ships, it soon afterwards placed three vessels of its own to protect the fleet during the Napoleonic Wars; they were taken over by Trinity House a few years later. Many others were commissioned during the nineteenth century, especially off England's east coast and the approaches to the Thames, where there were many treacherous shoals.

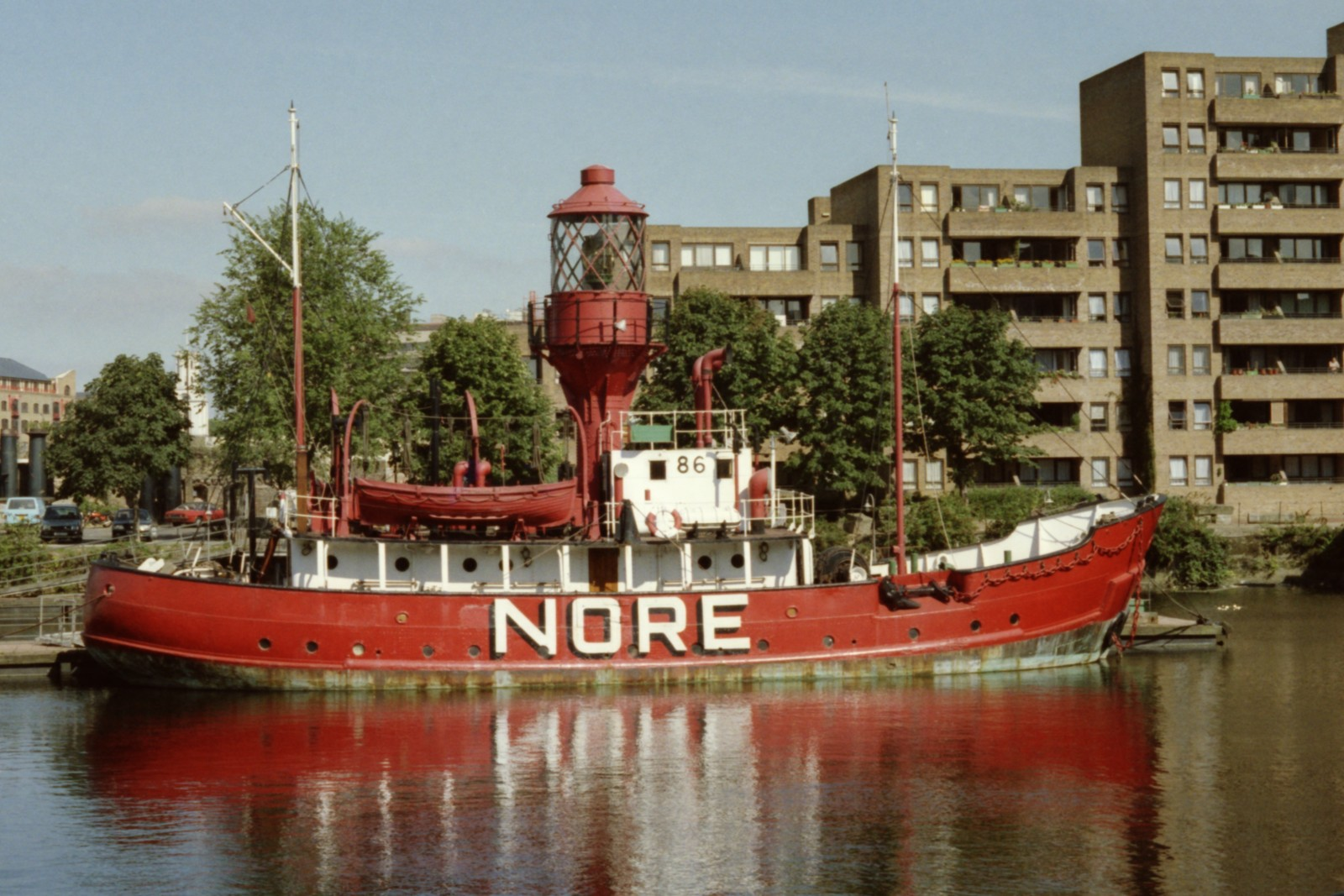
Lightship LV86, stationed at the Nore from 1931 to 1974

Following their acquisition of the Admiralty ships, all English and Welsh lightvessels were maintained by Trinity House, with the exception of the four vessels in the approaches to the River Mersey, which were maintained by the Mersey Docks and Harbour Board until 1973, and those in the Humber Estuary, which were the responsibility of the Humber Conservancy Board.

=== Communications and safety ===
Communication with lightvessels proved to be a major problem for Trinity House; lightvessel crews were well-placed to observe ships in distress, but could not always alert lifeboats on shore. After a series of shipwrecks, an experiment was conducted whereby a nine-mile undersea cable was run from the Sunk lightvessel in the Thames Estuary to the post office at Walton-on-the-Naze. This was intended to commence in 1884, but was plagued by delays; the trial was unsuccessful as the cable repeatedly broke.

As a result of a motion brought forward by Sir Edward Birkbeck, a Royal Commission was established to look at the issue of 'electrical communication' and gave its first Report in 1892; the East Goodwin lightvessel was used during one of Guglielmo Marconi's early experiments in radio transmission in 1896. The world's first radio distress signal was transmitted by the East Goodwin lightvessel's radio operator on 17 March 1899, after the merchant vessel Elbe ran aground on the Goodwins, while on 30 April that year, the East Goodwin vessel transmitted a distress signal on its own behalf, when the SS R. F. Matthews rammed it in a dense fog. Safety was further improved by the development of more powerful lamps and through the replacement by foghorns of the gongs previously used as fog signals.

=== Crew ===
Until the second half of the 20th century, all Trinity House vessels were permanently manned. An 1861 article in the Cornhill Magazine described lightshipmen as being paid 55 shillings a month (in addition to drawing 1 shilling and sixpence a week "in lieu of 3 gallons of small-beer"): the vessels were supplied, and the crews relieved, once a month. It was also noted that "a general tone of decent, orderly and superior conduct" was observed, that the men were "very respectable [...] swearing and profane language are [...] prohibited" and that every man was supplied with a Bible as well as "a library of varied and entertaining literature".

By the start of the 20th century, Trinity House lightvessels had a crew of 11, of whom seven (a master and six ratings) would be on active duty at any one time. It was an extremely demanding and dangerous profession, and it would take 15 to 20 years of service to be promoted to master.

=== Replacement ===
The majority of British lightvessels were decommissioned during the 1970s - 1980s and replaced with light floats or LANBY buoys, which were vastly cheaper to maintain: in 1974 at the time of Trinity House's original development project, lightship annual running costs at £30,000 were ten times those of the LANBY.

The remaining UK lightvessels have now been converted to unmanned operation and most now use solar power.

== Vessels ==
Unlike lightships in the United States and other parts of the world, Trinity House lightvessels were usually unpowered and needed to be towed to or from their position. In order to act as effective daymarks they were painted red, with the station name in large white letters on the side of the hull, and a system of balls and cones at the masthead for identification. The first revolving light was fitted to the Swin Middle lightvessel in 1837: others used occulting or flashing lights. White lights were preferred for visibility though red and very occasionally green (as with the Mouse lightvessel) were also used.

It is likely that photographs on various websites showing named lightvessels, may appear to be structurally different to comparable records on other web pages due to the fact that the particular vessel might have been withdrawn from a station after photographing and being towed away for drydocking, overhaul and possible direction to a new station and therefore a different lightvessel would have been substituted at the named station on withdrawal of the previous lightvessel. This has been most evident on those vessels that have been withdrawn and shipped to another port at home or abroad to become a floating museum, floating restaurant, 'clubhouse', etc. Scarweather LV and Helwick LV have for instance changed their rôle in their lifetime and their appearance on various records varies considerably.

== England ==
=== Active stations ===
The following are active stations at which Trinity House still maintains unmanned lightships, which also act as weather stations.

Name	Image	Position	Characteristic	Vessels employed
Foxtrot 3			Fl W 10s	Light vessel no. 93 (from 2001, until 2003), LV17
East Goodwin		Goodwin Sands	Fl W 15s	Light vessel no. 93 (from 1947, until 1953), Lightvessel no. 21
Greenwich			Fl W 5s	Light vessel no. 5
Sandettie		Sandettie Bank	Fl W 5s	Sandettié (from 1978, until 1989)
Sevenstones			Fl(3) W 30s	Sevenstones Lightship (1841) (from 1841, until 1879), Tyne III (from Sep 1879, until 1883), T.S. Orwell (from 1947, until 1958)
Sunk Inner			Fl(5) 15s	Sunk Inner (from 2007)
Varne		Varne Bank	Fl R 5s	Varne, Lightvessel no. 21 (from 1980)

=== Former stations ===
Name	Position	Operator	Sea	Vessels employed	Notes
Mersey Bar		Mersey Docks and Harbour Company	River Mersey	Alarm (from 1913, until 1960), Planet (from 1960, until 1972)	
Bar Flat	Wisbech Bar		The Wash		Established 1878; later replaced by Roaring Middle LV
Barrow Deep	Barrow Deep		Thames Estuary		
Black Deep	Black Deep		Thames Estuary		Station established 1889
Brake	Brake Bank		English Channel	Gull Stream (from 1930, until 1940)	Station established 1930, replacing Gull LV station, due to narrowing of the navigable Gull Stream
Bull	Bull Sand	Humber Conservancy Board	Humber	Spurn (from 1959)	
Calshot Spit	Calshot Spit		Southampton Water	Lightvessel no. 78 (from 1914), Tyne III (from 1943, until 1951), Light vessel no. 16	
Channel			English Channel	Planet, Light vessel no. 3	
Cockle	Great Yarmouth		North Sea	T.S. Lord Nelson (from 1936)	
Cork	Cork Ledge		North Sea	LV86, T.S. Lord Nelson	
Corton	Lowestoft		North Sea		
Cromer Knoll			North Sea		
Crosby	Crosby Channel	Mersey Docks and Harbour Company	Liverpool Bay		
Inner Dowsing	Inner Dowsing		North Sea	Light vessel no. 16, Light vessel no. 95, Light vessel no. 93 (1998)	The last manned lightship station, replaced by the Dowsing lighthouse in 1991.
Outer Dowsing	Outer Dowsing		North Sea	Outer Dowsing	
Dudgeon	Dudgeon Shoals		North Sea		Dudgeon was the second lightvessel to be established, with a patent granted to David Avery in 1736. LV63 was on station when bombed by the Luftwaffe on 29 January 1940. Only one crew member, John Sanders, survived. The incident was the subject of a 1940 British Government propaganda film, Men of the Lightship.
Edinburgh Channel	Edinburgh Channels		Thames Estuary	LV86	Station established 1889 replacing the S.W. Longsand buoy
English and Welsh Grounds			Bristol Channel	Light Vessel 72, John Sebastian	
Falls			Strait of Dover		
North Folkestone Gate			Strait of Dover		Part of wartime Folkestone Gate Channel defences; discontinued 1919
South Folkestone Gate			Strait of Dover	Light vessel no. 75	Part of wartime Folkestone Gate Channel defences. LV75 attacked on station and sunk by German bombers in July 1940, with the loss of two crew members, Jack Wade and Harry North
Formby	Formby Beach	Mersey Docks and Harbour Company	Liverpool Bay		
Galloper	The Galloper		North Sea	Tyne III (1929), Light vessel no. 93 (from 1954, until 1974)	Station first established by the Admiralty in 1803 to protect the fleet during the Napoleonic Wars; replaced by buoy 1977
Girdler	Girdler Shoal		Thames Estuary		In 1884 the Girdler lightship was rammed and sunk by the screw steamer Indus; there were no deaths.
Gull	Goodwin Sands	British Admiralty Office, Trinity House	North Sea	Gull Stream (from 1929, until 1930)	Marked the Gull Stream: station first established by the Admiralty in 1809 and taken over by Trinity House in 1826. Narrowing of the channel led to Gull being replaced by Brake LV in 1930
Gunfleet	Gunfleet Sands	Trinity House	Thames Estuary		Replaced by Gunfleet Lighthouse in 1850.
Haisborough	Haisborough Sands		North Sea	Light vessel no. 3, Lightvessel no. 68	
Humber		Humber Conservancy Board	Humber	Helwick (from 1937, until 1942)	Maintained by Humber Conservancy Board.
Kentish Knock	Kentish Knock		North Sea	Light vessel no. 3, Lightship 2000, Jenni Baynton (from 1949, until 1953)	
Smiths Knoll	Smiths Knoll	Trinity House	North Sea		
Leman and Ower		Trinity House	North Sea		
Longsand		Trinity House	Thames Estuary		
Lune Deep		Trinity House	Morecambe Bay		Unattended gas lit "lightboat", established 1909
Mid Barrow	Barrow Deep	Trinity House	Thames Estuary		In the middle of fairway of Barrow Deep, 9m SW of Barrow Deep LV
Morecambe Bay		Trinity House	Morecambe Bay	Breeveertien, LV94, Light vessel no. 70 (1903)	
Mouse	Mouse Sand	Trinity House	Thames Estuary	Gull Stream	
Nab	Nab Rock	Trinity House	The Solent		Replaced by the Nab Tower in 1920.
Newarp	Newarp Banks	Trinity House	North Sea	Light vessel no. 44, Lightvessel no. 21 (1972), LV83 (1967)	
Nore	Nore	Trinity House	Thames Estuary	LV86 (from 1941, until 1942)	The world's first manned lightship, 1731.
North Goodwin	Goodwin Sands	Trinity House	North Sea		
North West		Mersey Docks and Harbour Company	River Mersey	Good Intent (from 1813)	
Outer Gabbard	Outer Gabbard	Trinity House	North Sea	Light vessel no. 3, Jenni Baynton (from 1962, until 1965), Tyne III (1911)	
Owers	The Owers, off Selsey Bill	Trinity House	English Channel	Light vessel no. 3	Replaced with a beacon. LV Owers now a wreck in Tel Aviv harbour.
Roaring Middle			The Wash		Replaced Bar Flat LV; replaced with buoy 1919
Royal Sovereign	Royal Sovereign Shoals	Trinity House	English Channel	Lightship 2000	Replaced with Royal Sovereign lighthouse 1971.
Selker	Selker Rocks	Trinity House	Irish Sea		
Shambles	The Shambles	Trinity House	English Channel	Tyne III (from 1891, until 1909), Trinity, Light vessel no. 67	
Shipwash	Shipwash Shoal		North Sea	Light Vessel 72, Mary Mouse 2 (from 1968, until 1969), LV94	
South Goodwin	Goodwin Sands	Trinity House	North Sea	Light vessel no. 69 (until 1940), Light vessel no. 90 (until 1954), LV17	Replaced South Foreland Low lighthouse. LV69 was sunk on station, probably by a mine, in October 1940. The replacement, LV90, sank on 27 November 1954 when cables to her two sea anchors broke in a hurricane-force storm. The ship ran onto the Goodwin Sands close to the Keller Gut and turned on her side. The seven crew members perished, the only survivor being Ronald Murton, an ornithologist from the Ministry of Agriculture and Fisheries. The wreck of the ship can still be seen at low tide. The next replacement ship was decommissioned and was towed away on 26 July 2006.
Spurn	Spurn Point	Humber Conservancy Board	Humber	Spurn (from 1927), Sula (from 1959)	
Sunk	Sunk Sand		Thames Estuary		Established 1802; replaced 2007 by Sunk Centre as part of a new Traffic Separation Scheme (TSS).
Sunk Centre			Thames Estuary		Established as part of TSS in 2007. Decommissioned 2021.
Swarte Bank			North Sea		Established 6 December 1912
Swin Middle	Swin	Trinity House	Thames Estuary		The first revolving light was fitted to the Swin Middle lightvessel in 1837.
Tongue	Tongue Sands		North Sea	Jenni Baynton, Light vessel no. 5 (1973)	
Lynn Well		Trinity House	The Wash	Gull Stream, Light Vessel no. 89	Replaced with a Lanby in September 1973.
Would	Haisborough Sands		North Sea		

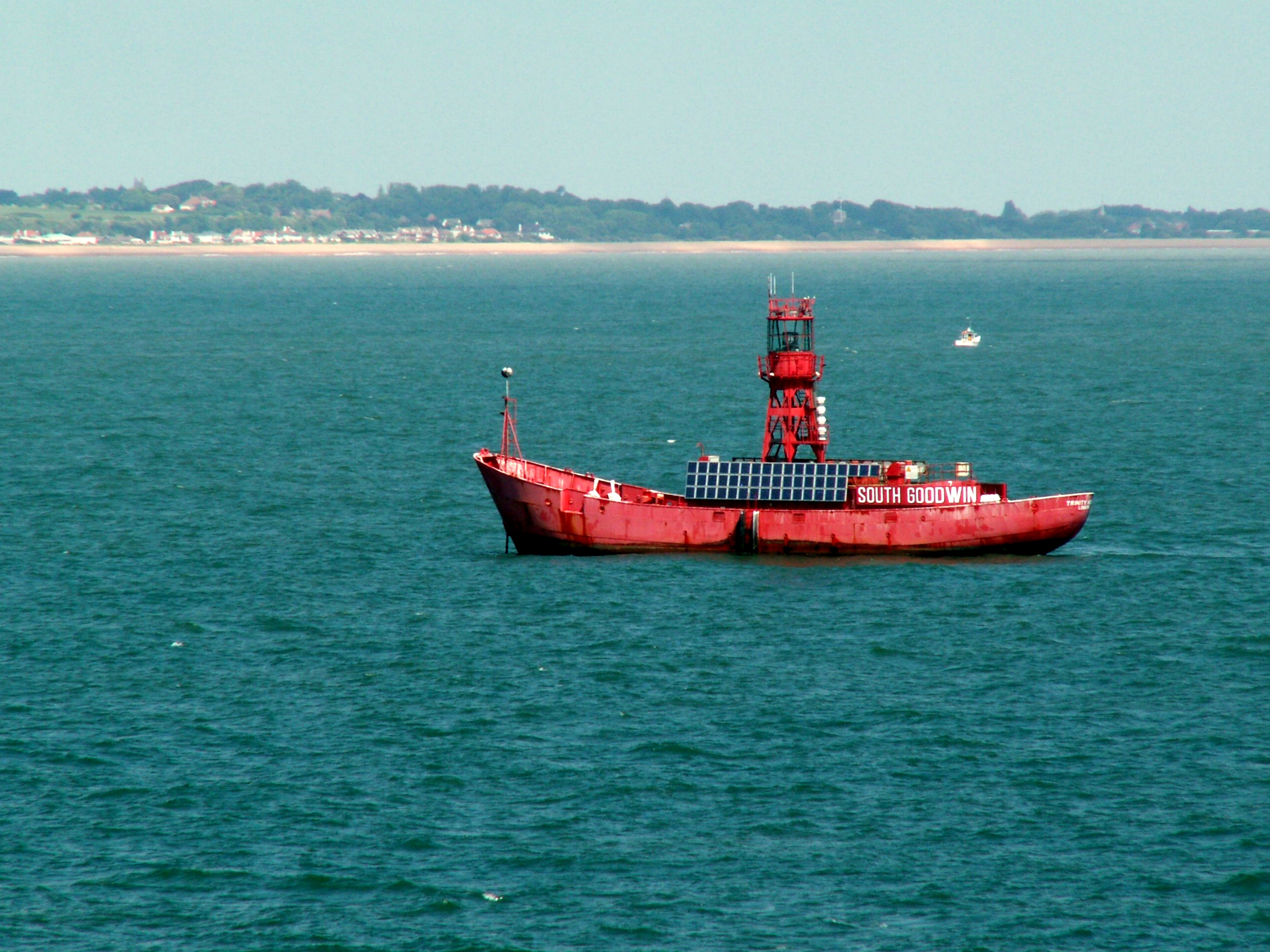
South Goodwin on station in 2006

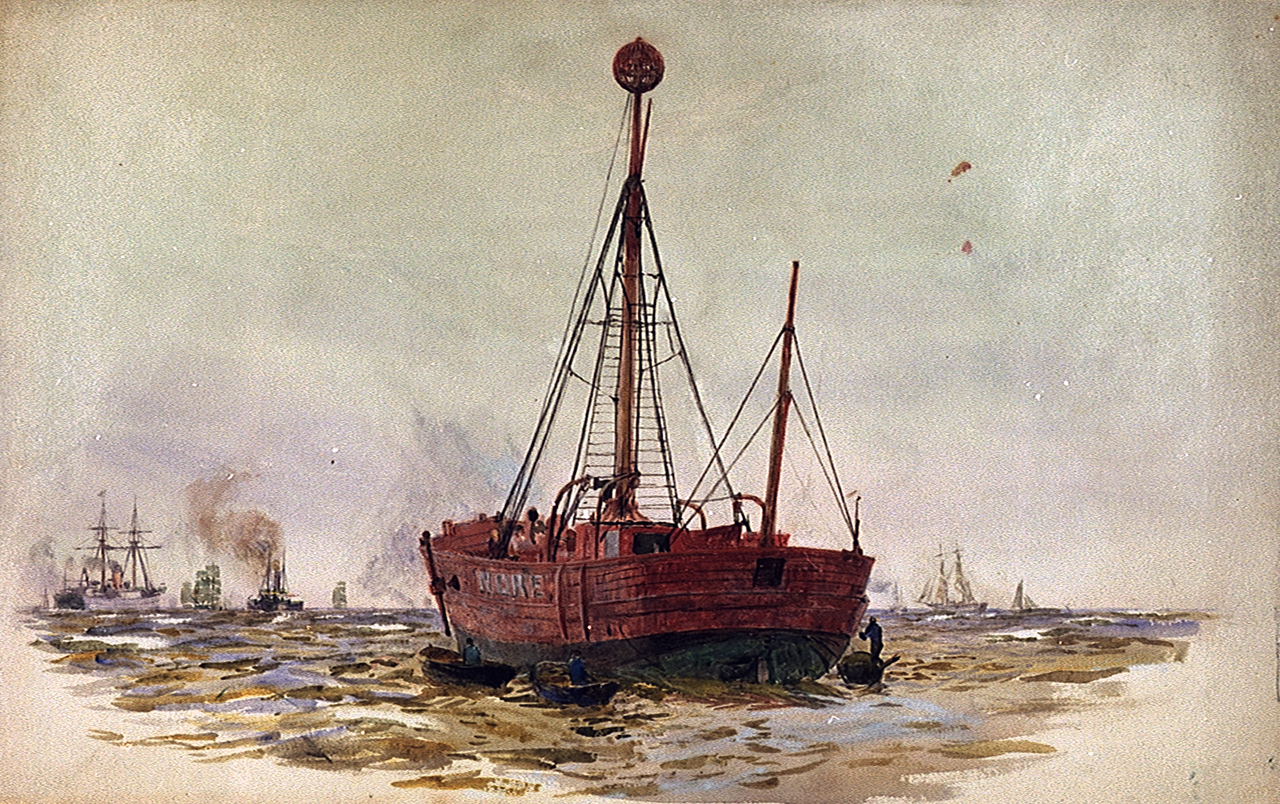
Drawing of the Nore lightvessel by William Lionel Wyllie circa 1900

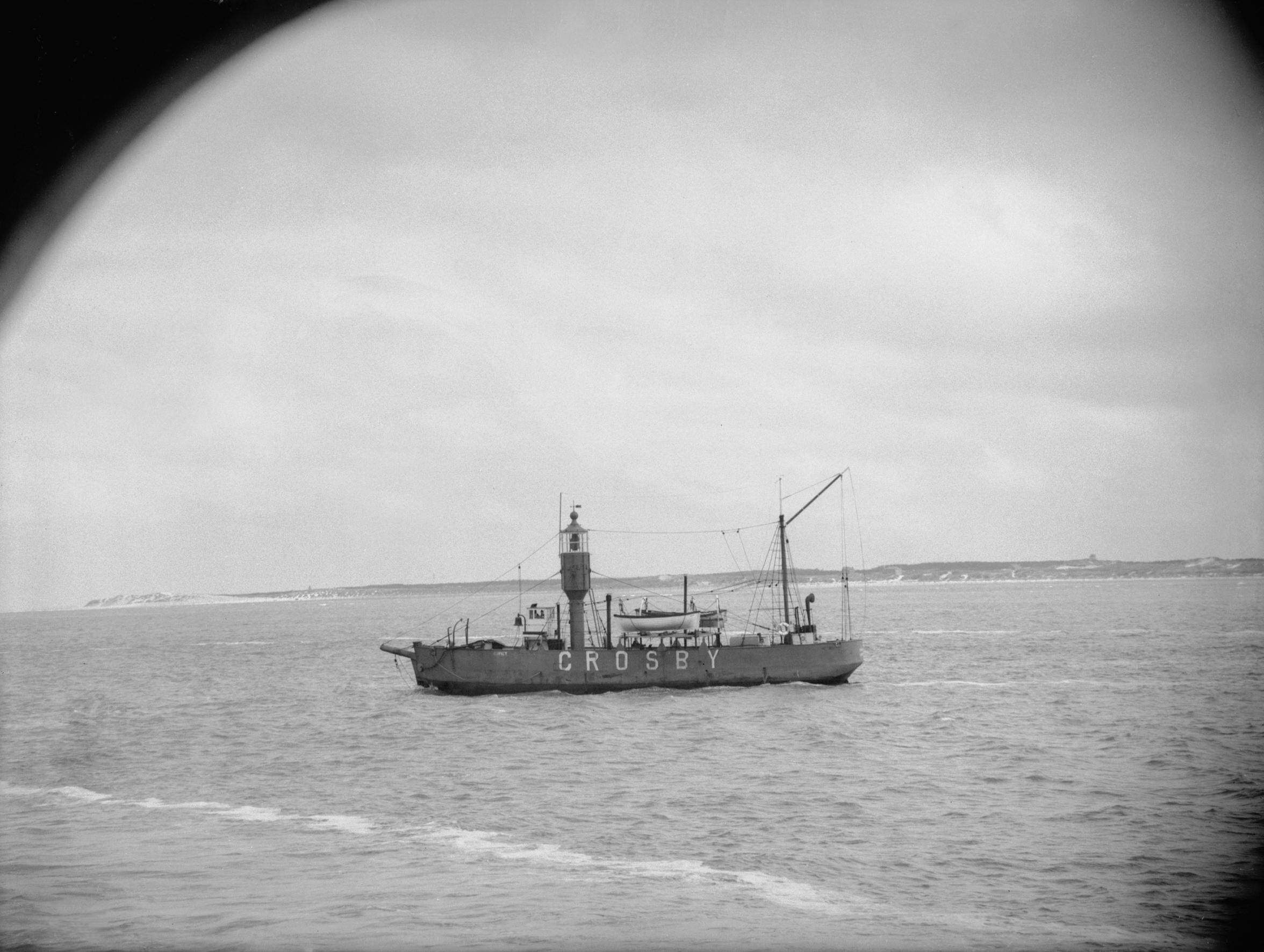
Lightvessel on Crosby station during WW2

== Scotland, Isle of Man ==
Lightvessels in Scotland and the Isle of Man were maintained by the Northern Lighthouse Board, with the exception of those maintained by the Clyde Lighthouse Trust and by the Dundee Port Trustees. Of the NLB vessels, only the North Carr was crewed.

Name	Position	Operator	Sea	Vessels employed	Notes
Abertay	Gaa Sand	Trustees of the Harbour of Dundee	Firth of Tay		Established 1877. First lightship in Europe to be fully automated, 1971; discontinued 1984.
Bahama Bank	Bahama Bank	Northern Lighthouse Board	Ramsey Bay	Bahama Bank (from 1848), Bahama Bank (from Sep 1879)	Replaced by Maughold Head Lighthouse in 1914.
Cath Sgeir	Isle of Gigha	Northern Lighthouse Board	Sound of Jura		Uncrewed "lightboat". Established 2 June 1905
Clyde	Kilbrannan Sound	Northern Lighthouse Board	Firth of Clyde	North Carr	Wartime station; established c. 1944
Garmoyle	Port Glasgow	Clyde Lighthouse Trustees	River Clyde		Established 1868. Replaced by buoy in 1905
Garvel		Clyde Lighthouse Trustees	River Clyde	Garvel	Original crewed lightship replaced 1882 by unattended, gas lit vessel built by Blackwood & Gordon. Removed 1915
North Carr	North Carr	Northern Lighthouse Board	Firth of Forth	North Carr (from 1887, until 1889), North Carr (from 1889, until 1933), North Carr (from 1933, until 1975)	
Skeirinoe	The Minch	Northern Lighthouse Board	Sea of the Hebrides		Uncrewed "lightboat" stationed near Scalpay; established 1906.
Otter Rock	Otter Rock		North Channel		Scottish Maritime Museum in Irvine has a small scale coloured General Arrangement (1923) from Builder (Clyde Shipbuilding and Engineering Co. Ltd. hull #249, 60 ft [183 m]).

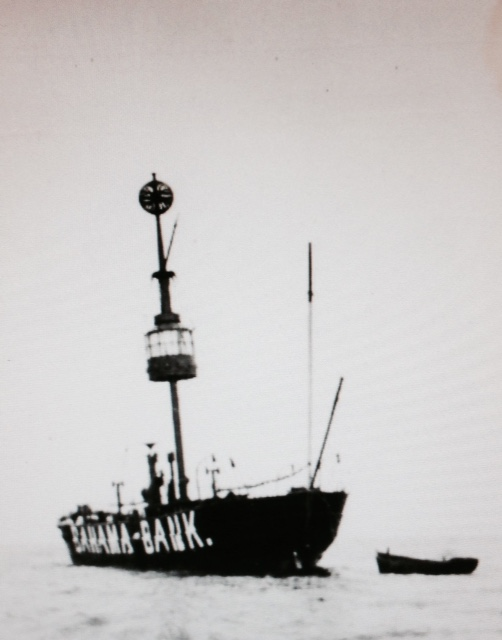
The Bahama Bank Lightship, date unknown

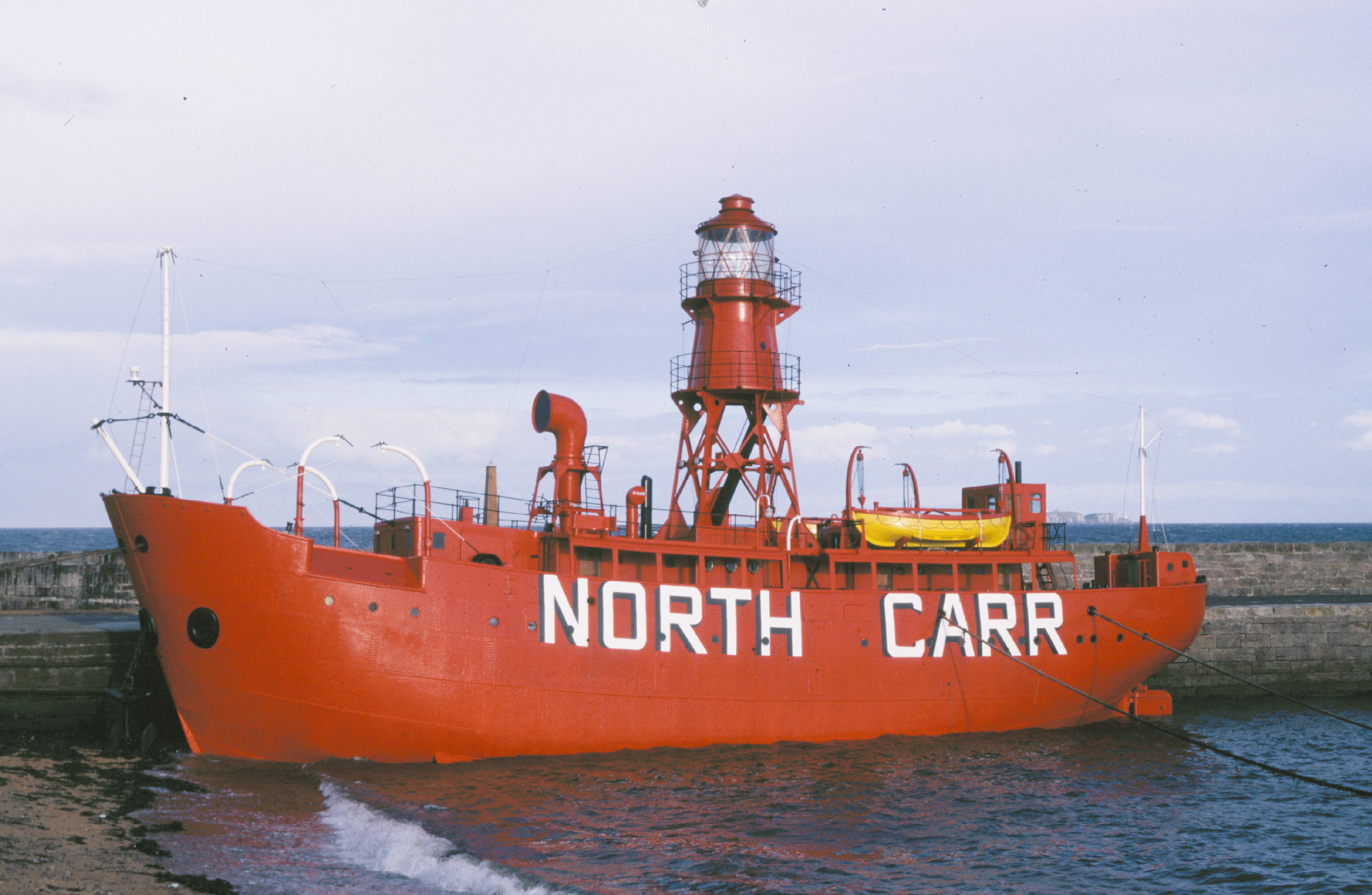
North Carr lightship in 1988

== Wales ==
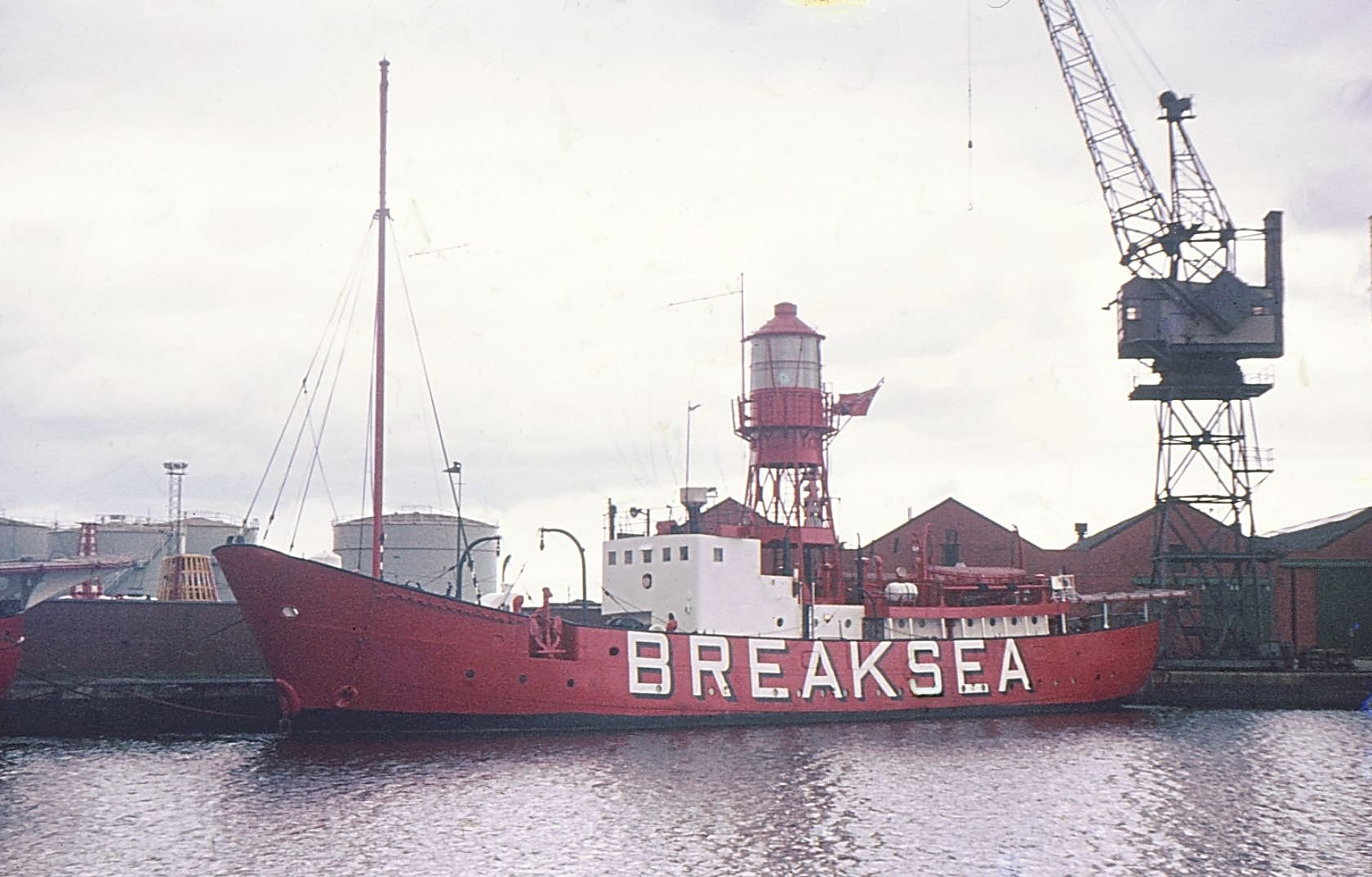
Breaksea Light Vessel following a refit at Swansea in 1978.

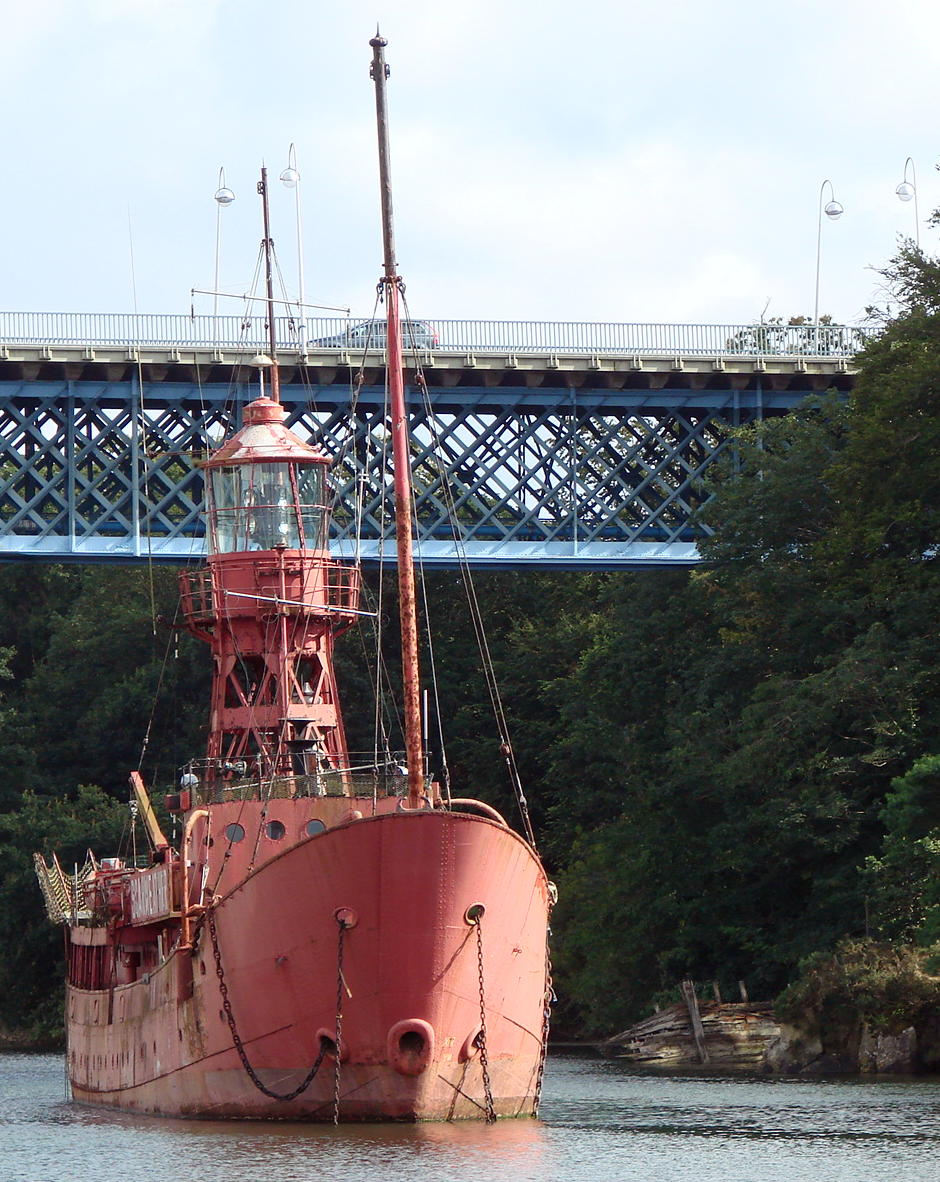
Scarweather

Former Welsh lightships were maintained by Trinity House. Remaining substitute navigational aids still are.

Name	Position	Operator	Sea	Vessels employed	Notes
Breaksea		Trinity House	Bristol Channel	Trinity	Replaced by a LANBY, then a lightfloat and currently a lighted buoy with RACON radar facility

- Helwick (off Worms Head)
- Milford Haven Lightvessel
- Scarweather (Swansea Bay; replaced with buoy 1989)
- St Gowan (off Pembrokeshire coast). The station once carried the name St Govan, i.e., spelling change

== See also ==
- List of lightvessels of Great Britain
- List of lighthouses in the United Kingdom
- Lightvessels in Ireland
- Trinity House
- Men of the Lightship
- Light float
