= List of shoals and sandbanks in the southern North Sea =

Shoals and sandbanks are characteristic underwater seabed features of the southern North Sea and the eastern English Channel. The relatively shallow water depth allows tidal currents to transport, configure and alter seabed materials, such as sand, shells, clay, and gravel, into elongated banks or shoals of shallow water.

== Sandbanks and shoals ==
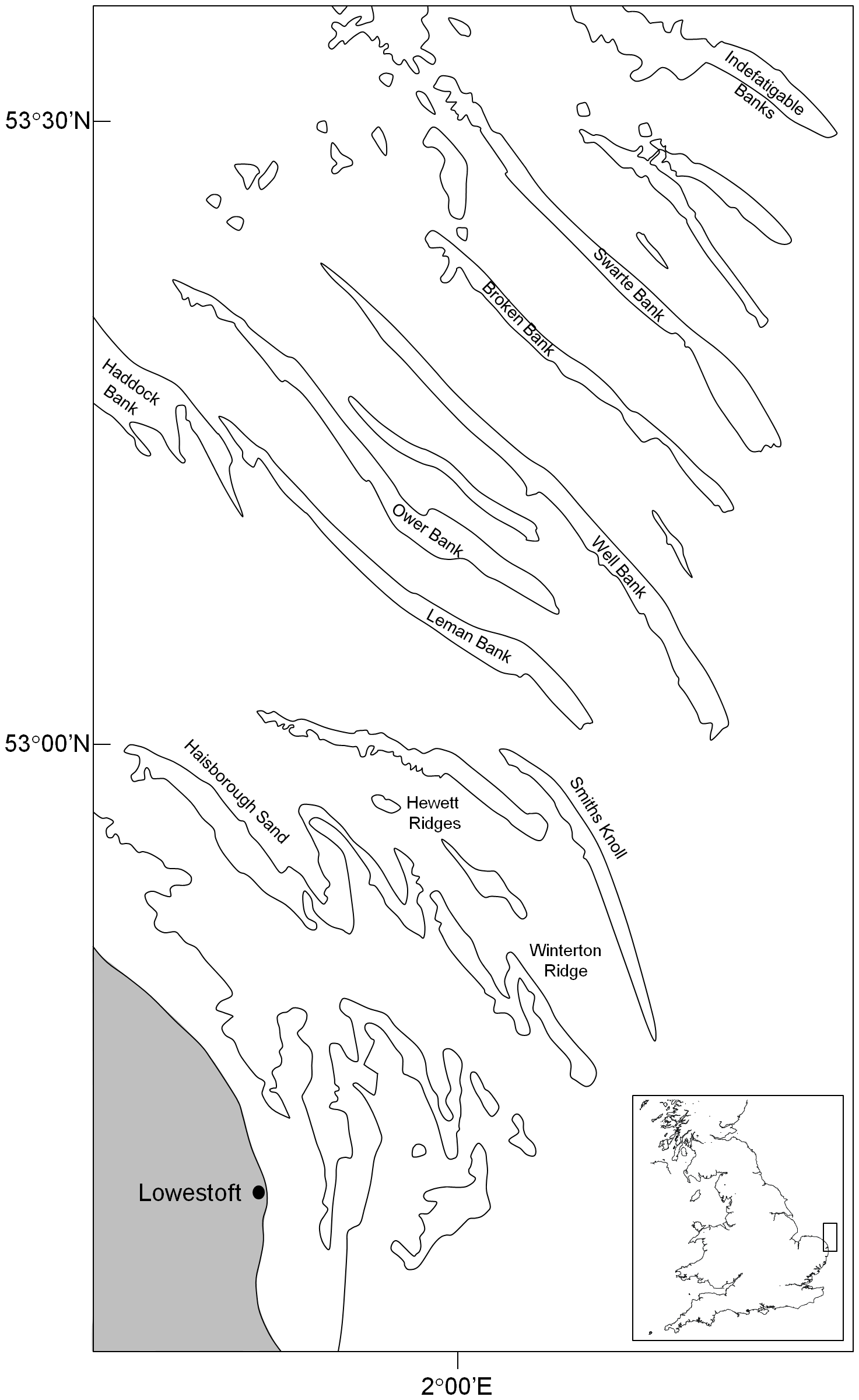
Banks and shoals in the southern North Sea off the coast of Suffolk and Norfolk.

=== Formation ===
In the southern North Sea the Spring Tide range is in excess of 7 metres. The large tidal amplitude produces tidal currents of 1.5 metres per second (m/s) on the flood tide, and 1.35 m/s during the ebb tide. Water flows parallel to the shore and this is reflected in the orientation of sandbanks. Typically, sandbanks of the English Channel and southern North Sea rise 10 to 25 m above the sea floor and are 10 to 30 km long and 1 to 3 km wide. The volume of material in some of the banks has been estimated at between 70 and 1100 Million m^{3}.

Cardinal marks

Strong eddies and rip tides occur in the vicinity of many shoals, and the sea can break heavily over shoals especially when the wind is against the tidal current. Sandbanks and shoals are often marked by buoys. There are usually north and south marks, and on large shoals, east and west marks.

=== Extent ===
The table below is a list of the named sandbanks and shoals of the southern North Sea, the Dover Strait (Pas-de-Calais) and the eastern English Channel (La Manche). The geographical extent is eastwards from a line (00°14'E) extending south from Beachy Head England to Étretat France in the English Channel, through the Straits of Dover, then north through the southern North Sea to a line extending east from Berwick-upon-Tweed England (55°50'N) to Ringkobing Fjord Denmark.

This area includes the shipping forecast areas of Wight (part); Dover; Thames; Tyne; Humber; Dogger and German Bight (part). It includes the territorial waters and exclusive economic zones of Belgium, Denmark, France, Germany, the Netherlands and the United Kingdom.

The Thames Estuary is defined as from the Nore Sand eastwards to a line from North Foreland to Harwich.

The Humber is defined as west of the Outer Sea Reach buoy 00° 06'E.

=== Abbreviations ===
SNS – Southern North Sea; S-N – South to North; E-W – East to West; SW-NE – South-West to North-East; SE-NW – South-East to North-West.

=== List ===
A tabulated list of shoals and sandbanks in the southern North Sea, Dover Strait and English Channel.

Shoals and sandbanks of the southern North Sea, Dover Strait and the eastern English Channel
Name	Country	Location	Coordinates at centre of bank or shoal	Orientation	Length, km	Width, km	Remarks
Akkaertbank	Belgium	SNS	51°23'N 02°49'E	SW-NE	7.4	0.5	
Aldeburgh Napes	UK	SNS	52°09'N 01°43'E	S-N	10	1	
Aldeburgh Ridge	UK	SNS	52°08'N 01°37'E	S-N	7	1	
Anrum Bank	Germany	SNS	54°38'N 08°00'E	S-N	23.4		
Banc Breedt	France	SNS	51°07'N 02°22E	SW-NE	24	2	
Banc de Snouw	France	SNS	51°04'N 02°15'E	E-W	7.5	1	
Barmade Bank	UK	SNS	55°00'N 00°00'	-	-	-	
Barrow	UK	Thames Estuary	51°37'N 01°10'E	SW-NE	5.5	3.5	The adjacent Barrow Deep used for dumping sewage sludge 1889-1998
Bassurelle Bank	UK & France	Dover Strait	50°38'N 01°05'E	SW-NE	15	2.5	
Bassurelle de la Somme	France	English Channel	50°12'N 01°22'E	SW-NE	5.2	0.6	
Bassure de Baas	France	English Channel	50°27'N 01°20'E		56		
Battur	France	English Channel	50°22'N 01°18'E		14		
Bawdsey Bank	UK	SNS	51°59'N 01°33'E	S-N	12.5	1.5	
Bergues Bank	France & Belgium	SNS	51°15'N 02°18'E	SW-NE	11	2	
Blakeney Overfalls	UK	SNS	53°01'N 01°11'E	E-W	4.0	1.0	
Bligh Bank	Belgium	SNS	51°33'N 02°35'E	SW-NE	5.5	0.5	
Boulder Banks	UK	English Channel	50°52'N 00°47'E	-	0.6	0.6	
Boulders Bank	UK	SNS	54°25'N 01°35'E	-	-	-	Dogger Bank
Broad Fourteens	Netherlands	SNS	53°00'N 00°03'E	S-N			Named from depth of 14 fathoms
Broadstairs Knoll	UK	SNS	51°21'N 01°29'E	-	5.5	5.5	
Broken Bank	UK	SNS	53°19'N 02°12'E	SE-NW	35	1	Volume of bank: 360 Million m^{3}
Brown Bank, Brown Ridge	UK & Netherlands	SNS	52°40'N 03°15'E	S-N	30	2	Bruine Bank
Bruceys Garden	UK	SNS	54°50'N 00°50'E	-	-	-	
Bullock Bank	France	English Channel	50°44'N 01°05''E		11		
Burcom Sand	UK	Humber	53°35'N 00°04'W	SE-NW	2.5	1	
Buiten Ratel	Belgium	SNS	51°15'N 02°31'E	SW-NE	14.8	2	
Bull Sand	UK	Humber	53°33'N 00°05'E	SE-NW	4.0	1.5	
Buxey Sand	UK	SNS	51°41'N 01°27'E	SW-NE	9	4	
Chequer Shoal	UK	Humber	53°33'N 00°10'E	E-W	3.5	2	
Cleaver Bank	Netherlands	SNS	54°10'N 03°08'E				Klaverbank
Coal Pit	UK	SNS	53°29'N 01°46'E				
Cork Sand	UK	SNS	51°53'N 01°24'E	S-N	8	4.5	
Corton Sands	UK	SNS	52°35'N 01°47'E	S-N			Position and depth changes
Cromer Knoll	UK	SNS	53°18'N 01°18'E	S-N	5	1	
Cutler Shoal	UK	SNS	51°59'N 01°27'E	SW-NE	2.5	0.5	
Docking Shoal	UK	SNS	53°10'N 01°45'E	-	13.5	13.5	
Dogger Bank	UK	SNS	54°43'N 02°46'E	-	260	100	Windfarm
Dogger Bight	UK	SNS	54°19'N 01°50'E	-	-	-	Dogger Bank
Dogger North Shoal	UK	SNS	54°55'N 01°35'E	-	17.1	21.6	Dogger Bank
Dogger Tail End	Germany & Netherlands	SNS	55°29'N 04°00'E	-	-	-	
Drillstone	UK	SNS	51°26'N 01°41'E				
Dudgeon Shoal	UK	SNS	53°17'N 00°56'E	SE-NW	9.75	7.5	Windfarm
Dunwich Bank	UK	SNS	52°14'N 01°40'E	S-N	3	1	
Dyck Central	France	SNS	51°07'N 02°12'E	SW-NE	8	1.5	
Dyck Occidental	France	SNS	51°05'N 02°00	SW-NE	18.5	2	
Dyck Oriental	France	SNS	51°13'N 02°23'E	SW-NE	13	2	
East Barrow	UK	Thames Estuary	51°35'N 01°10'E	SW-NE	9	3.5	
East Spaniard	UK	Thames Estuary	51°25'N 01°01'E	E-W			
Easternmost Shoal	UK	SNS	54°40'N 02°30'E	-	54	40.5	Dogger Bank
Engelsmanplaat	Netherlands	SNS	53°27'N 06°03'E				
Fairy Bank	France	SNS	51°23'N 02°20'E	SW-NE	5.5	0.5	
Fisher Bank	Denmark	SNS					
Flemish Banks	Belgium	SNS	51°17'N 02°38E				
Foulness Sand	UK	SNS	51°37'N 01°02'E	SW-NE	11	4.5	Extends from shore
Four Fathoms Sand Ridge	UK	English Channel	50°48'N 00°39'E	SW-NE	5.4	0.6	
Galloper	UK	SNS	51°46'N 01°57'E	S-N	5.5	1	Windfarm
Girdler	UK	Thames Estuary	51°30'N 01°08'E	E-W	3	1	
Goodwin Sands	UK	SNS	51°16'N 01°21'E	SW-NW	22		
Grandes Écamias	France	English Channel	50°59'N 00°54'E	E-W	5	0.6	
Großer Knechtsand	Germany	SNS	53°50'N 08°21'E				
Gunfleet Sand	UK	Thames Estuary	51°45'N 01°15'E	SW-NE	23	3	Abandoned lighthouse; Windfarm
Haddock Bank	UK	SNS	53°19'N 01°31'E	SE-NW			
Haile Sand	UK	Humber	53°32'N 00°13'E	-			
Haisborough Sands	UK	SNS	52°54'N 01°42'E	SE-NW	16	2	Volume of bank: 530 Million m^{3}
Hammond Knoll	UK	SNS	52°52'N 01°55'E	SE-NW	9.7		Volume of bank: 99 Million m^{3}
Hastings Shoals	UK	English Channel	50°49'N 00°34'E	SW-NE			
Hearty Knoll	UK	SNS	52°46'N 02°10'E	SE-NW			Volume of bank: 120 Million m^{3}
Helgoland	Germany	SNS	54°12'N 07°55'E	-	9	9	
Hessle Sand	UK	Humber	53°43'N 01°25'W	E-W	2	1	
Hewett Ridge	UK	SNS	52°52'N 02°00'E	SE-NW	28	4	Gas field. Volume of bank: 190 Million m^{3}
Holm Sand	UK	SNS	52°29'N 01°47'E	S-N	11	1.5	
Horse of Willingdon	UK	English Channel	50°45'N 01°02'E	E-W	3	1	
Hull Middle	UK	Humber	53°42'N 00°22'W	E-W	3.5	1	
Indefatigable Bank 1, 2 & 3	UK	SNS	53°30'N 02°23'E	SE-NW		4	Gas field. Volume of bank: 85 Million m^{3} (1), 69 Million m^{3} (2), 310 Million m^{3} (3)
Inner Bank	UK	SNS	53°12'N 02°01'E	SE-NW	18	1	Volume of bank: 110 Million m^{3}
Inner Bank	UK	SNS	54°20'N 00°30'E	-	-	-	Dogger Bank
Inner Dowsing	UK	SNS	53°19'N 00°35'E	S-N	7.5	3	Windfarm
Inner Gabbard	UK	SNS	51°55'N 01°54'E	S-N	16	1.5	Windfarm
Inner Silver Pit	UK	SNS	53°32′N 00°47′E				
In Ratel	France	SNS	51°07'N 02°16'E	SW-NE	6.5	1	
In Ruytingen	France	SNS	51°13'N 02°17'E	SW-NE	12	5.5	
Jim Howe Bank	UK	SNS	52°57'N 02°25'E	SE-NW			
Kachelotplate	Germany	SNS	53°39'N 06°49'E				
Kentish Knock	UK	SNS	51°37'N 01°38'E	S-N	13.5	2.5	
Knock John	UK	Thames Estuary	51°34'N 01°04'E	SW-NE	3	1	Maunsell fort
Kobbergrund	Denmark	SNS	57°12'N 11°15'E				
Koresand	Denmark	SNS	55°15'N 08°29'E				
Kwintebank	Belgium	SNS	51°15'N 02°38'E	SW-NE	11	2	
Le Colbart	France	Dover Strait	50°53'N 01°20'E	SW-NE	16	1	Also called The Ridge
Leman Bank	UK	SNS	53°08'N 01°55'E	SE-NW	42	11	Gas field. Volume of bank: 840 Million m^{3}
Les Ridens	France	Dover Strait	50°45'N 01°18'E				Several shoals
Long Sand	UK	Thames Estuary	51°37'N 01°30'E	SW-NE	33	7.5	
Maplin Sand	UK	Thames Estuary	51°33'N 00°47'E	SW-NE	23	6.1	Extends from coast
Maplin Spit	UK	Thames Estuary	51°36'N 01°06'E	SW-NE	4.5	1	
Margate Sand	UK	Thames Estuary	51°26'N 01°20'E	E-W	9	2	
Middelbank	Netherlands	SNS	51°40'N 03°22'E	SW-NE	14.8	0.5	
Middelkerke Bank	Belgium	SNS	51°15'N 02°43'E	SW-NE	13	2.5	
Middle Cross Sand	UK	SNS	52°39'N 01°52'E	S-N	3	1	
Middle Sand	UK	Thames Estuary	51°27'N 01°02'E	SW-NE	6	1.5	
Middle Shoal	UK	Humber	53°37'N 00°02'W	SE-NW	4.0	1	
Mouse	UK	Thames Estuary	51°32'N 01°04'E	SW-NE	4.5	0.5	
Newarp Banks	UK	SNS	52°42'N 02°00'E	S-N	8.5	2	
Noordhinder Bank	Belgium	SNS	51°39′N 02°41′E	S-N	11	1	
Nieuwpoort Bank	Belgium	SNS	51°13'N 02°41'E	SW-NE	9.25	1	
Nore Sand	UK	Thames Estuary	51°29'N 00°46'E	E-W	6	1	
North Cross Sand	UK	SNS	52°45'N 01°52'E	S-N	7	1	
North Falls	UK	SNS	51°40'N 01°57'E	S-N	11	1	
Oaze	UK	Thames Estuary	51°30'N 01°00'E	SW-NE	5.5	1	
Oost Dyck	Belgium	SNS	51°18'N 02°29'E	SW-NE	14.8	1.5	
Oostende Bank	Belgium	SNS	51°16'N 02°48'E	SW-NE	15	2	
Oosthinder	Belgium	SNS	51°32'N 02°38'E	SW-NE	16.6	1.5	
Out Ruytingen	France	Dover Strait	51°14'N 02°17°E	SW-NE	33	2	
Outer Bank	UK	SNS	54°30'N 01°05'E	-	-	-	Dogger Bank
Outer Dowsing	UK	SNS	53°25'N 01°08'E	SE-NW	19.5	1	Windfarm
Outer Gabbard	UK	SNS	51°58'N 02°03'E	S-N	5	2	Windfarm
Outer Silver Pit	UK	SNS	54°00′N 02°00′E				
Ower Bank	UK	SNS	53°14'N 01°52'E	SE-NW	45	1	Volume of bank: 730 Million m^{3}
Paardenmarkt	Belgian	SNS	51°21'N 03°17'E				
Pan Sand	UK	Thames Estuary	51°28'N 01°10'E	E-W	3.5	1	
Raan	Netherlands	SNS	51°27'N 03°20'E	-	22	6	
Race Bank	UK	SNS	53°12'N 00°51'E	SE-NW	21.0	5.5	Windfarm
Red Sand	UK	Thames Estuary	51°28'N 01°00'E	E-W	2	0.5	Maunsell fort
Petits Écamias	France	English Channel	50°01'N 00°53'E	E-W	5.2	1.5	
Richel	Netherlands	SNS	53°17N 05°08'E				
Quemer	France	English Channel	50°15'N 01°18'E	-	10	-	
Ridins de Dieppe	France	English Channel	50°06'N 01°08'E	-	10.4	10.4	
Ridins de Tréport	France	English Channel	50°05'N 01°16'E	-	5	0.6	
Rosse Spit	UK	Humber	53°30'N 00°15'E	SW-NE	4.5	2	
Rough Shoals	UK	SNS	51°54'N 01°30'E	S-N	10	8	HM Fort Roughs
Royal Sovereign Shoals	UK	English Channel	50°45'N 00°26'E	S-N	4	1	
Sandettie Bank	France & UK	Dover Strait	51°09′N 01°47′E	SW-NE	27	5	
Schouwenbank	Netherlands	SNS	51°48′N 03°25′E	SW-NE	18.5	1	
Scroby Sands	UK	SNS	52°38'N 01°47'E	S-N	14	2	Windfarm
Sheringham Shoal	UK	SNS	53°03'N 01°10'E	E-W	10	1.0	
Shingles	UK	Thames Estuary	51°31'N 01°13'E	E-W	6.5	5.0	
Shipwash	UK	SNS	51°58'N 01°37'E	S-N	18	2	
Shivering Sand	UK	Thames Estuary	51°30'N 01°24'E	SW-NE	3.5	0.5	Maunsell fort
Simonszand	Netherlands	SNS	53°31'N 06°24E				
Sizewell Bank	UK	SNS	52°10'N 01°40'E	S-N	4	1	
Smal Bank	France & Belgium	SNS	51°06'N 02°30'E	SW-NE	26	2	
Smiths Knoll	UK	SNS	52°52'N 02°13'E	S-N	28	1	Volume of bank: 390 Million m^{3}
Sole Pit High	UK	SNS	53°35'N 01°23'E	SW-NE	7	1	
South Cross Sand	UK	SNS	52°34'N 01°51'E	S-N	9	1	
South Dogger Ground	UK	SNS	54°18'N 02°25'E	-	-	-	Dogger Bank
South Falls	UK	SNS	51°21'N 01°47'E	S-N	28		
South Shoal	UK	Humber	53°36'N 00°00'	SE-NW	3.5	1	
Spaniard	UK	Thames Estuary	51°27'N 01°03'E	E-W	1	0.5	
SouthWest Patch	UK	SNS	54°35'N 02°05'E	-	67.5	22.5	Dogger Bank
Spile	UK	Thames Estuary	51°07'N 00°57'E	E-W	2	0.5	
Steenbanken	Netherlands	SNS	51°41'N 02°25'E	SW-NE	11	0.5	
Stephensons Shoal	UK	English Channel	50°53'N 00°54'E	E-W	5	-	
Stroombanc	Belgium	SNS	51°13'N 02°48'E	SW-NE	13	2	
Sunk Sand	UK	Thames Estuary	51°39'N 01°15'E	SW-NE	24	3	Maunsell fort (ruin)
Swarte Bank	UK	SNS	51°24'N 02°13'E	SE-NW	41	1	Volume of bank: 440 Million m^{3}
Sylt Outer Reef	Germany	SNS	55°06'N 07°35'E	-	-	-	
Terschellinger Bank	Netherlands	SNS	53°32'N 05°08'E	SE-NW	-	-	
Tertius (sandbank)	Germany	SNS	54°08'N 08°42E				
The Hills	UK	SNS	54°21'N 00°60'E	-	-	-	
Thornton Ridge or Bank	Belgium	SNS	51°34'N 03°00'E	SW-NE	6	1	Windfarm
Tizard Bank	UK	Thames Estuary	51°33'N 01°12'E	E-W	2.5	0.5	
Tongue Sand	UK	Thames Estuary	51°31'N 01°13'E	E-W	7.5	1.5	Maunsell fort (ruin)
Triton Knoll	UK	SNS	53°23'N 01°00'E	SE-NW	25.5		Windfarm
Varne Bank	UK	Dover Strait	51°00'N 01°23'E	SW-NE	9.3	1	
Vergoyer Banks	France	English Channel	50°33'N 01°15'E		24		
Weiss Bank	Germany	SNS	55°00'N 06°00'E	-	-	-	
Well Bank	UK	SNS	53°14'N 02°11'E	SE-NW	57	2	Volume of bank: 1100 Million m^{3}
West Barrow	UK	Thames Estuary	51°35'N 01°56'E	SW-NE	13	1.8	
West Dyck	France	Dover Strait	51°03'N 01°51'E				
Westhinder	Belgium	SNS	51°28'N 02°31'E	SW-NE	22	2	
Whitaker Spit	UK	Thames Estuary	51°40'N 01°07'E	SW-NE	6	1	
Winterton Ridge	UK	SNS	52°50'N 02°02'E	SE-NW	8	0.5	Volume of bank: 105 Million m^{3}

== See also ==
- Shoal
- Geology of the southern North Sea
- Geography of the North Sea
