= Inner and Outer Dowsing sand banks =

The Inner and Outer Dowsing sand banks are shallow-water shoals off the Lincolnshire coast of the UK sector of southern North Sea. They have been used for navigation, as a commercial fishery, for aggregate dredging, and more recently as the location for major offshore wind farms.

== Dowsing banks and shoals ==
The Inner Dowsing Bank is 7.5 km long north to south by 3.0 km wide. The centre of the bank is about 13 km north-east off Ingoldmells Point, Lincolnshire. The water depth ranges from 1 m to 30 m below sea-level. The Inner Dowsing Bank together with the adjacent Race Bank and North Ridge Bank have been designated a Special Area of Conservation (SAC) and a Marine Protected Area (MPA). The Inner Dowsing sandbank comprises coarse sand with areas of gravel, its elongated shape is maintained by the tidal currents.

The Outer Dowsing Shoal is a shallow-water sand bank, aligned north-west to south-east. The shoal is about 19.5 km long and is rarely more than 1 km wide. Its mid point is located about 65.2 km due east of Donna Nook on the Lincolnshire coast. At its shallowest the water depth is 4 m. The bank comprises gravel and sand deposits. To the south-west of the bank and running parallel to it is the Outer Dowsing Channel an area of relatively deep water. Both the channel and an area to the north-east of the shoal have been designated for dredging for sand gravel and pebbles.

== Fishing ==
The Inner Dowsing Bank is a spawning and nursery ground for commercially important fish such as the sand eel and the Atlantic herring and is a feeding ground for lemon sole, European plaice, common lobster and the commercially exploitable pink shrimp. Around the Outer Dowsing area commercially important fish include whiting, dab, sprat, herring, plaice, mackerel and lemon sole. Less abundant but commercially important species include cod, haddock, sole and ling.

== Windfarms ==
See main articles Lynn and Inner Dowsing wind farms; Triton Knoll wind farm

The Lynn and Inner Dowsing wind farms were originally separate schemes but were developed as a single project. Construction work began in 2006 and was completed in 2009. The wind farm is located at the south-west corner of the Inner Dowsing bank. The farm has a maximum output of 194 MW from 54 Siemens turbines with a generating capacity of 194 MW. The capacity factor of the farm has been 31 to 36%.

The Outer Dowsing Offshore Wind project is a 1.5 GW offshore windfarm in the Southern North Sea 54 km from the Lincolnshire coast. The project is currently (2023) undergoing consultation.

The Triton Knoll wind farm is located immediately west of the Outer Dowsing Channel. It has an output capacity of 857 MW generated by 90 × 9.5 MW turbines.

== Navigation ==
The Inner and Outer Dowsing banks and shoals present a hazard to shipping because of the shallow water. The shoals have therefore been marked by a variety of navigation markers, including lightships, light houses and buoys.

=== Light vessels ===
- Light Vessel Outer Dowsing. The first Light Vessel to be stationed on the Outer Dowsing shoal on 1 October 1861.
- Light Vessel 16 was the oldest vessel. This wooden ship was built by William Pitcher of Northfleet, Kent in 1840. It was originally located on Spurn station and was relocated to Inner Dowsing on 18 April 1873.
- Light Vessel 82 also known as Outer Dowsing Light Vessel was built by Armstrong, Whitworth & Co Ltd at the High Walker yard on the River Tyne in 1925.
- Light Vessel 93 was built by Philip and Son Dartmouth, Devon in 1938. It originally served on the Galloper station. After mine watching duties from 1947 to 1953, it served on the Inner Dowsing, East Goodwin and Galloper stations.
- Light Vessel 95 was built by Philip and Son of Dartmouth, Devon in 1939. It was initially deployed at the South Goodwin and the Goodwin Sands stations, it was subsequently stationed elsewhere including at Inner Dowsing. It was the first UK Light Vessel to be converted to solar power in the 1990s to allow for automatic unmanned operation.

Dimensions of light vessels used on the Dowsing banks
Name	Length (m)	Beam (m)	Depth (m)	Gross tonnage
LV 16	26.67	6.40	3.35	158
LV 82	38.0	7.6	4.6	309
LV 93	40.84	7.62	4.57	519
LV 95	40.00			517

=== Other infrastructure ===
The Inner Dowsing Light Vessel was replaced in 1971 by the Dowsing light tower. This was a four-leg steel structure formerly belonging to the National Coal Board where it had been used to undertake prospective drilling for natural gas in the North Sea. This was the first steel structure of its kind off the coast of Britain. In 1991 after 20 years of service, the inner Dowsing light tower was decommissioned and brought back to shore and dismantled. The Inner Dowsing light was replaced by a LANBY (Fl. 10s 12m 15 Nautical miles Horn (1) 60s).

Also in 1991 the gas production installation designated 27/14 B1D (53° 33’ 43” N 0° 52’ 48” E) was installed in the North Sea to exploit the Amethyst gas field. The B1D platform is located 4.5 miles West of the North end of Outer Dowsing Shoal. The platform was equipped with a Racon and a light, the light characteristic was Fl (2) 10 s it was at 28 metres and had a range of 22 Nautical Miles. It also had a Horn (2) 60 s. In 2020 the owners Perenco stated its intention to decommission the Amethyst field and to remove all the platforms, including B1D. This exercise was completed in 2022.

=== Buoys ===
Today the Inner and Outer Dowsing sand banks are marked with a number of buoys as aids to navigation.

Inner and Outer Dowsing buoys
Name	Coordinates	Characteristic	Light Characteristic	Range (nautical miles)	Buoy type (see note)	Other features
Inner Dowsing	53° 19.100' N 00° 34.800' E	West mark	Q (3) 10s	7	1	Racon
Middle Outer Dowsing	53° 24.819' N 01° 07.790' E	Green cone	Fl (3) G 10s	5	2	
North Outer Dowsing	53° 33.517' N 00° 59.590' E	North mark	Q	9	1	Racon/AIS
South Inner Dowsing	53° 12.119' N 00° 33.694' E	South mark	Q (6) + LFl 15s	5	2	Bell

Note: Type 1 buoys are 15 metres tall and weigh 10 tonnes, Type 2 buoys are 3 metres diameter and weigh 6 tonnes.

== Ship wrecks ==
_{An incomplete list of ships wrecked on the Inner and Outer Dowsing shoals:}

_{Ships wrecked on the Inner and Outer Dowsing shoals}
_{Date}	_{Name}	_{Location}
_{January 1861}	_{Cockermouth Castle}	_{Inner Dowsing}
_{December 1863}	_{Luna}	_{Outer Dowsing}
_{February 1870}	_{Moro}	_{Outer Dowsing}
_{August 1875}	_{Jones}	_{Outer Dowsing}
_{September 1875}	_{Aquila}	_{Outer Dowsing}
_{May 1882}	_{Canoma}	_{Outer Dowsing}
_{November 1888}	_{Aladin}	_{Inner Dowsing}
_{October 1895}	_{Michele B Skutaka}	_{Inner Dowsing}
_{September 1901}	_{John Pickard}	_{Inner Dowsing}
_{September 1901}	_{HMS Cobra}	_{Outer Dowsing}
_{December 1906}	_{Heathpool}	_{Outer Dowsing}
_{September 1908}	_{Pacific}	_{Outer Dowsing}

== See also ==
- Nore
- Dogger Bank
- Fisher Bank
- Silver Pit
- Lightvessel stations of Great Britain
