= Light Vessel 93 =

1938 UK lightship

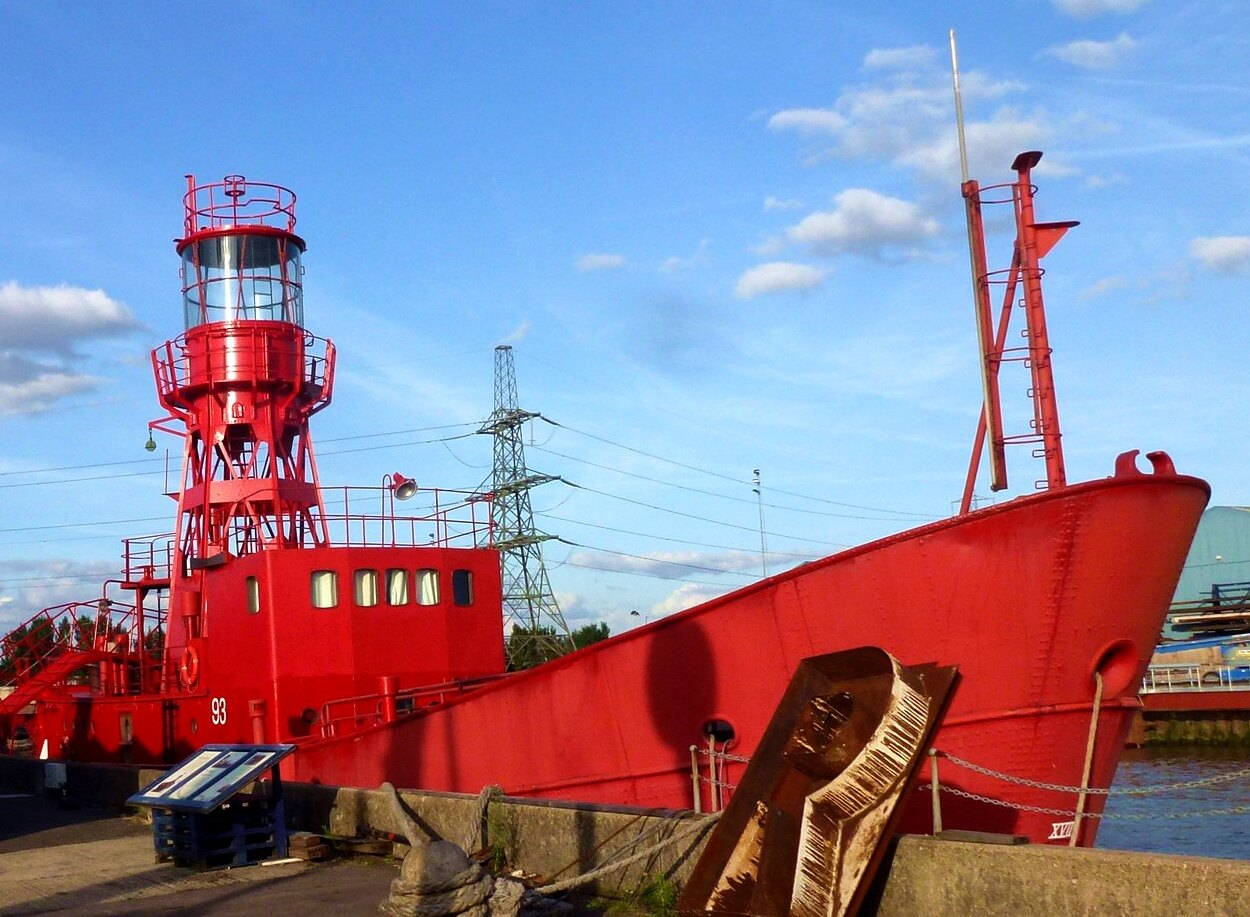
- At Trinity Buoy Wharf in 2012

History
- Owner: Trinity House (1938–2004); Michele Turriani (since 2004)
- Builder: Philip and Son (Dartmouth, Devon)
- Completed: 1938
- In service: (as lightship): 1939–2004; (as photographic studio): since 2004
- Refit: Renovated 1980, 1996; Converted to solar, 1998; Converted to photographic studio, 2004
- Status: Extant as of 2024

General characteristics
- Type: Lightship (as originally built)
- Tonnage: 519 gross
- Length: 134 ft (41 m).
- Beam: 25 ft (7.6 m)
- Depth: 15 ft (4.6 m)
- Propulsion: None

Light Vessel 93 (sometimes known as Lightship 93) was a lightship of Trinity House in England, currently used as a photography studio. She was built in Dartmouth, Devon, in 1938 and served on stations including Galloper sand bank, the River Thames, Goodwin Sands, Inner Dowsing, Sunk Sands and Foxtrot 3. She was sold to Michele Turriani in 2004 and converted into a studio operating at Royal Victoria Dock in London. Turriani attempted to sell the vessel from 2020. In 2024 Light Vessel 93 was moved to King George V Dock.

== Trinity House service ==
Light Vessel 93 was built in 1938 by Philip and Son at Dartmouth, Devon. She entered service in 1939 with Trinity House, the body responsible for operating maritime navigation aids in England and Wales. She was one of the "Nineties" class of light vessel built in the years before and following the Second World War. Light Vessel 93 measures 134 feet (41 m) in length, 25 feet (7.6 m) in beam and 15 feet (4.6 m) in depth. She has a gross tonnage of 519. She has a heavy-duty hull made of rivetted 22-millimetre (0.87 in) thick steel. She had no means of propulsion and was positioned by tugs and heavy-duty anchors.

Light Vessel 93 first served as a marker on the Galloper sand bank in the North Sea, off Suffolk. From 1947 to 1953 she was positioned on the River Thames and used to monitor for naval mines, a legacy of the Second World War. Afterwards Light Vessel 93 returned to sea at the Galloper station and at East Goodwin, marking the Goodwin Sands off Kent. In 1971 her steering shelter was replaced by Swan Hunter, who also carried out a renovation in 1980. In 1996 she was further renovated by Holman & Sons of Penzance. Light Vessel 93 was converted to solar power in 1998 and afterwards served to mark the Inner Dowsing sandbank off The Wash; at Sunk Sands off Harwich and at Foxtrot 3, marking a navigation point in the English Channel. Light Vessel 93 left service in 2004 and was sold to a private buyer.

== Private ownership ==
The purchaser of the vessel in 2004 was photographer Michele Turriani who converted it into a photographic studio. Four of the original crew cabins were converted into bedrooms and other spaces converted into two further bedrooms and a large bathroom, with 19th-century copper bath. The 75-square-metre (810 sq ft) former engine room was converted into a studio space. Turriani also fitted stained glass to the former light tower, which sits 45 feet (14 m) above water level. It operated as a studio from the Royal Victoria Dock in London and has been used to photograph the Arctic Monkeys, Mumford and Sons, Andrew Garfield, Daniel Radcliffe, Jessie J, Billie Piper, and Dermot O'Leary. It has also featured in photoshoots for World of Interiors, Elle Décor and twice for Vogue.

In 2020 Turriani listed the vessel for sale with a guide price of £700,000. By 2022 it remained unsold and the guide price had been reduced to £595,000. By 2024 the vessel was no longer for sale. In May 2024 the vessel was relocated to King George V Dock to make way for a proposed footbridge.

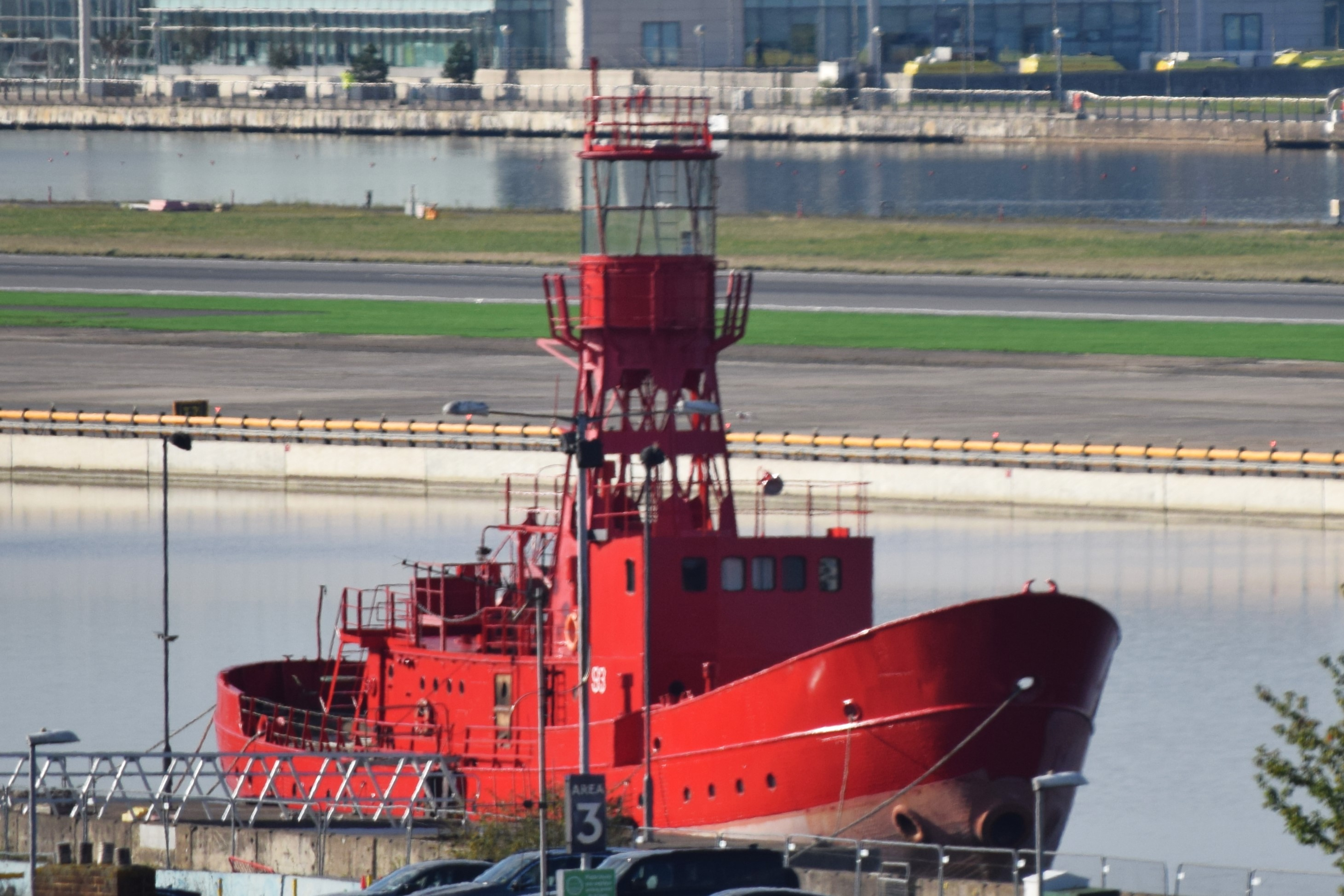
At the King George V Dock in 2024.
