= LANBY =

Navigational buoy

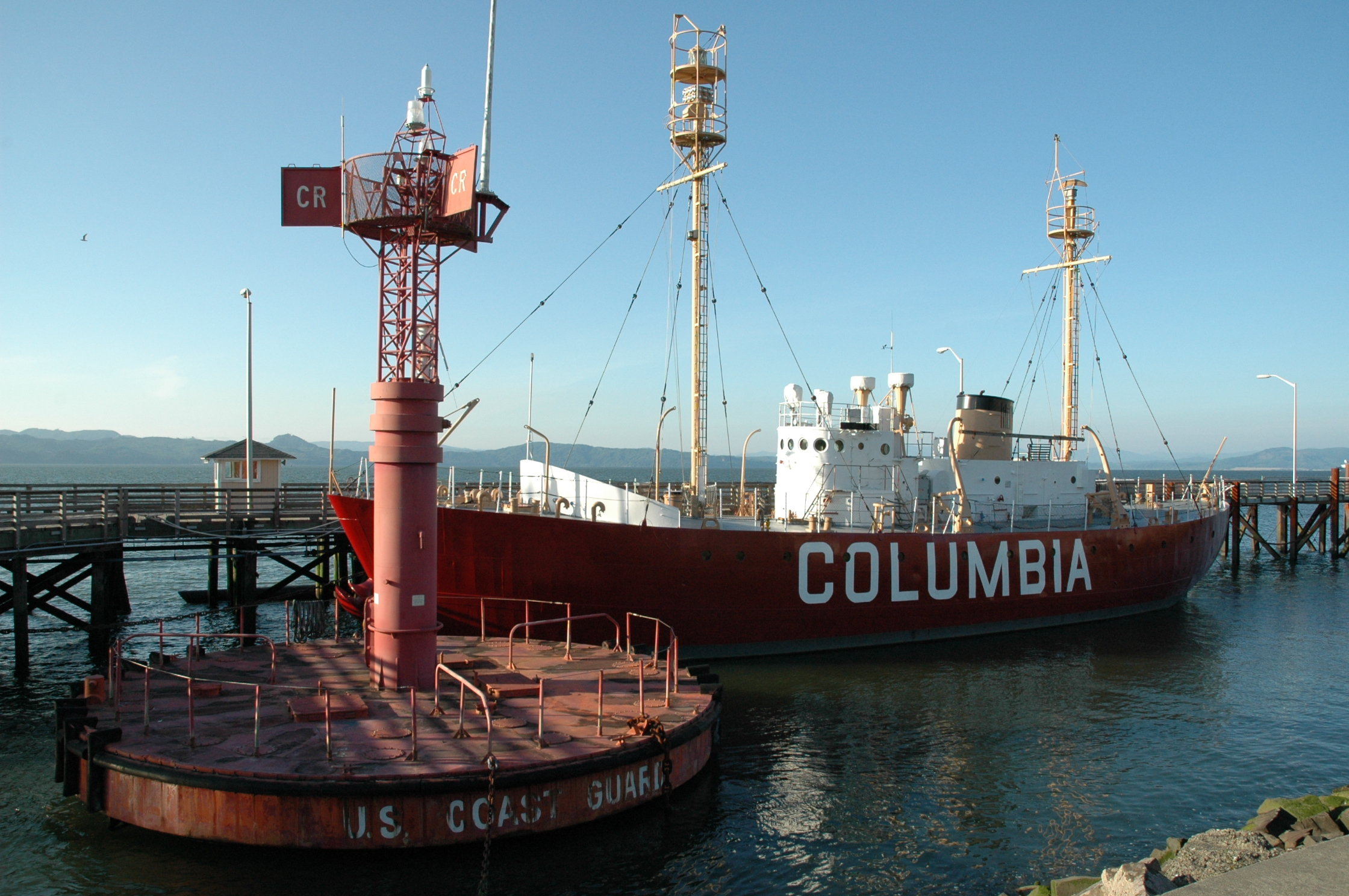
The LANBY (on left) that replaced lightship Columbia, at the Columbia River Maritime Museum in Oregon

LANBY, a contraction of Large Automatic Navigation BuoY, was a type of floating navigational aid designed to replace lightships. Now obsolete, they were originally made in the USA by General Dynamics and adapted by Hawker Siddeley Dynamics for use in British waters in the early 1970s. They consisted of a circular hull with a raised central structure containing a 360° light and foghorn, and sometimes also a radio beacon. They were monitored from onshore and designed to run for extended periods without repair. Their running costs were estimated to be as low as 10% of those of lightships.

== Equipment ==
UK models followed the General Dynamics design: Power was supplied by three diesel alternators of 230 V, individually rated at 5 kW continuous output. These were each run in a 72-hour operational cycle of 24 hours under power, followed by 48 at rest. Maintenance and refuelling was at six-month intervals. A static rectifier provided continuous power at 28 V DC, charging a nickel-iron accumulator to operate the xenon discharge tube main light and ancillary equipment, including a UHF telemetry link to a monitoring shore station. The Hawker Siddeley models incorporated components from the original General Dynamics design, but were found adequate with only two diesel generator sets — one running continuously for six months, and one on standby. Revolving sealed-beam main lights were substituted for discharge tubes, as they were more easily seen than short-duration flashes.

== Withdrawal ==
Experience showed that it was difficult to attain the required reliability in British waters due to the high acceleration forces experienced in rough seas with 14-metre (46 ft) waves and 7-knot (8.1 mph; 13 km/h) currents. Alternative experiments were made with more stable platforms, such as the Royal Sovereign Lighthouse — a concrete tower on a flat base constructed on shore, floated into place and sunk to rest on the seabed.

The automatic technology was later used successfully in more conventional lightships, such as the Calshot Spit lightvessel.

A LANBY replaced the Bar lightship Planet in the Mersey estuary in 1972 and remained in service for 21 years before it was replaced.
