= Lynn and Inner Dowsing Wind Farms =

Pair of wind farms in the North Sea off Lincolnshire, England

Lynn and Inner Dowsing wind farms
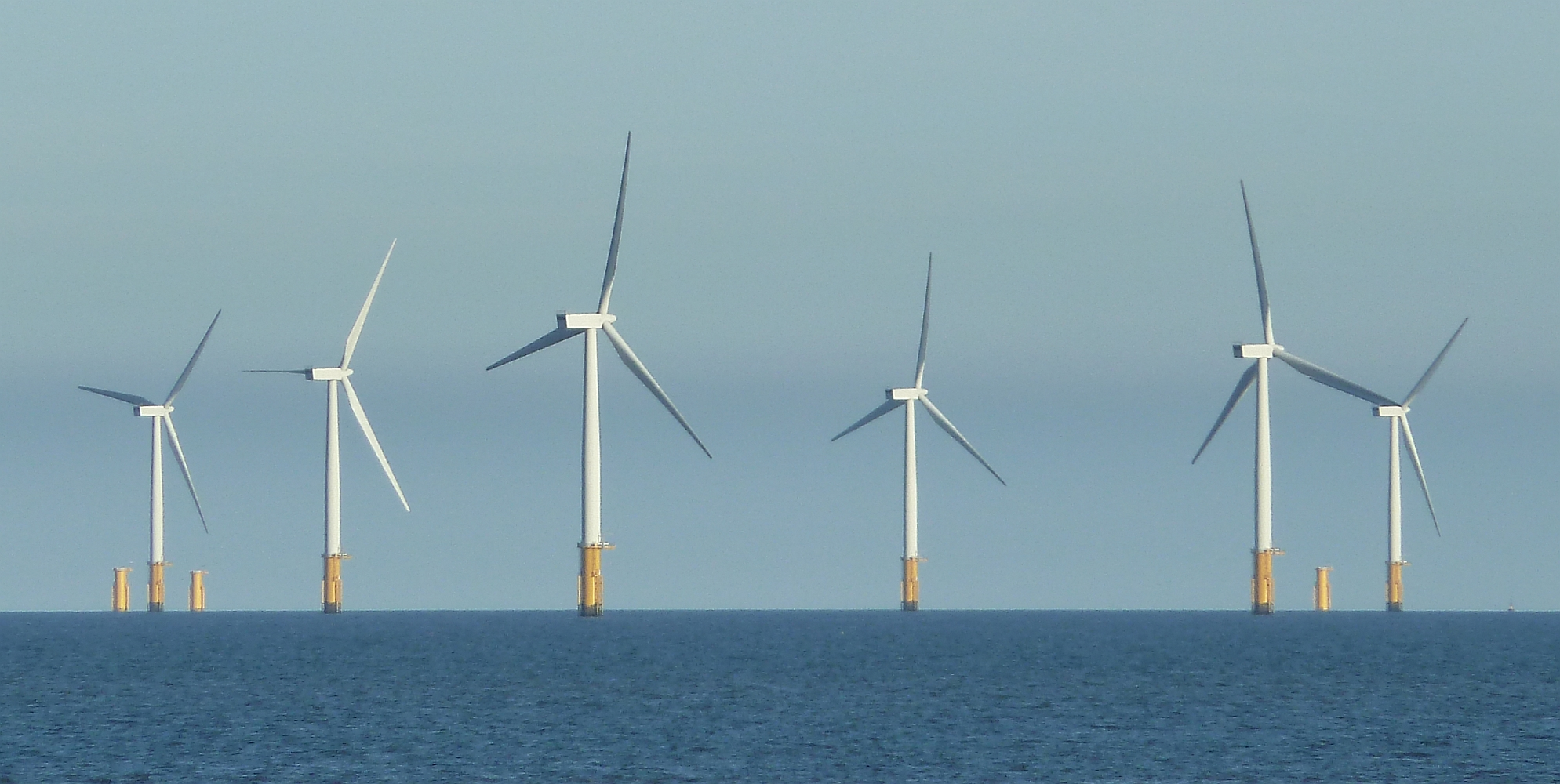
- Lynn wind farm with Lincs wind farm under construction to rear (2011)
- Country: England, United Kingdom
- Location: The Wash/North Sea
- Coordinates: 53°07′39″N 00°26′10″E
- Status: Operational
- Commission date: March 2009

Wind farm
- Type: offshore
- Distance from shore: 5.2 km (3.2 mi)

Power generation
- Units operational: 54
- Make and model: Siemens Wind Power 3.6MW
- Nameplate capacity: 194 MW
- Capacity factor: 31-36% (2009-2012)

External links
- Website: www.glidwindfarms.com
- Commons: Related media on Commons

Wind farm layout

The Lynn and Inner Dowsing wind farms are a pair of round 1 wind farms located in the North Sea, in the shallow waters at the entrance to The Wash off the coast of Lincolnshire, England. The wind farms were developed as a single unit after planning consent was given in 2003. Construction work began in 2006 and was completed in 2009.

The farm has a maximum output of 194MW from 54 Siemens Wind Power 3.6-107 turbines with a generating capacity of 194 MW. The capacity factor of the farm has been 31 to 36%.

== History ==
=== Planning and construction ===
The Lynn wind farm and the Inner Dowsing wind farm were initially developed as separate projects by AMEC and Renewable Energy Systems. The projects received planning consent in 2003. At the planning stage the development was opposed by fishermen.

In 2003 Centrica Renewable Energy acquired the Lynn and the Dowsing wind farm projects and merged them into a single development. Tendering for construction of the wind farm took place from 2005, with contracts awarded between 2006 and 2007.

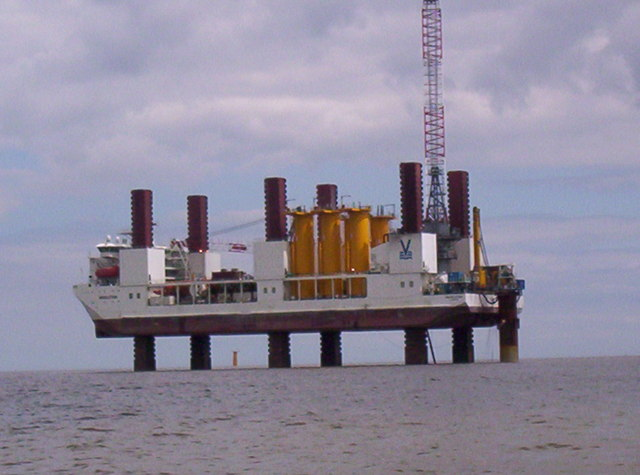
TIV Resolution installing wind turbines (June 2007)

In 2006 Nexans was awarded a contract to supply inter-array and export cabling for the windfarm, consisting of 32 and 40 kilometres (20 and 25 mi) of 36kV three core cables. MT Hojgaard was contracted to install the offshore foundations. Siemens Wind obtained the contract to supply 54 of its SWT-3.7-107 wind turbines for the farm, and Siemens Power Transmission & Distribution supplied the onshore 33 to 132kV substation and associated switchgear, and was contracted to lay the onshore cables.

Onshore civil engineering work began in late 2006 - a substation was constructed near Skegness., onshore construction including cable laying, was complete by 2007. Installation of the offshore foundations was undertaken using the vessel MV Resolution - foundations were installed by 2007, (Note: Foundations were installed by either pile driving or drilling a pile driving. Water depths were 8.5 to 16 metres (28 to 52 ft) 6.3 to 11.2 metres (21 to 37 ft) according to LORC) and cables and turbines were installed by 2008, with the last turbine installed July 2008. Commissioning work was complete in March 2009.

=== Finance and ownership ===
The project cost was an estimated €349 million.

In 2009 TCW acquired a 50% stake in the farm (and the 26MW onshore Glens of Foudland wind farm) from Centrica for £84 million ($137.5 million).

In early 2016 Centrica and EIG Global Energy Partners agreed to sell the wind farm to a consortium (Green Investment Bank 51% and BlackRock 49%). The sale including the 26MW onshore Glens of Foudland wind farm was valued at c. £423 million.

=== Operations and maintenance ===
During 2010 Siemens changed bearing on the Burbo Bank wind farm due to corrosion problems, and examined bearings at Lynn and Inner Dowsing; subsequently the company decided to replace blade bearings on all 53 machines in 2011.

In 2012 Centrica established a maintenance base for the wind farm at No.3 Fish Dock at the Port of Grimsby.

In the first four years of full operation (2009–12) the farm had a capacity factor of between 31 and 36%. Levelised costs have been estimated at £102/MWh for Lynn and £97 for Inner Dowsing. In c.2012-3 an additional 20MW of turbines were built within the wind farm, as part of the Lincs Wind Farm development - they were connected to the Lincs' export grid.

In 2014 Cofely Fabricom GDF Suez was awarded the contract to carry out grouting repairs and structural modifications on the turbine foundations. (Note: Grouted joints installed c.2007-8 by MT Hojgaard between monopile and transition pieces had been found to be of a substandard design at the Robin Rigg wind farm.)

By 2014 some of the initial 'under warranty' service plans were coming to an end. In early 2015 ABB was awarded a maintenance contract for the electrical generators and other electrical equipment on the wind farm. Cofely Fabricom GDF Suez was awarded a general repair contract for the farm including major repairs in March 2015.

== See also ==
- Wind power in the United Kingdom
- List of offshore wind farms in the United Kingdom
- List of offshore wind farms
- List of offshore wind farms in the North Sea
- Inner and Outer Dowsing sand banks
