= Lightship 2000 =

Lightvessel that was used as a chapel in Cardiff

Coordinates: 51.798978°N 2.451975°W

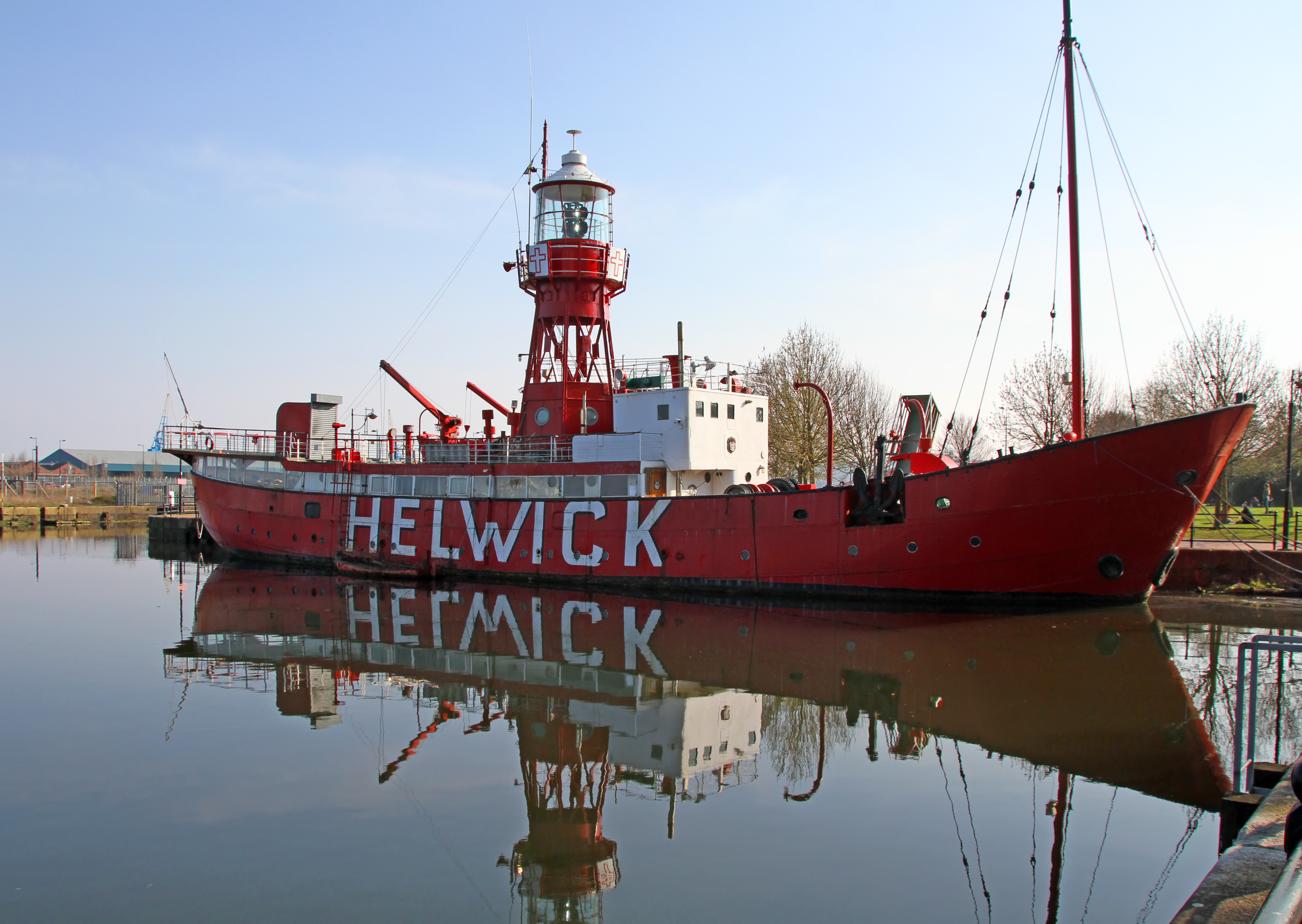
- Lightship 2000, April 2015

History

United Kingdom
- Name: Light Vessel 14
- Operator: Trinity House
- Ordered: September 1951
- Builder: Philip and Son, Dartmouth, Devon
- Cost: £80,685
- Yard number: 1246
- Launched: 22 September 1953
- Commissioned: 27 November 1953
- Fate: Sold, 1991
- Status: Undergoing restoration

General characteristics
- Type: Lightvessel
- Displacement: 550 long tons (559 t)
- Length: 137 ft 3 in (41.83 m) o/a
- Beam: 25 ft (7.6 m)
- Draught: 15 ft (4.6 m)
- Crew: 7
- Aviation facilities: Helipad (from 1975)

Lightship 2000 (Welsh: Goleulong 2000) was a restored old red lightvessel with a cafe and chapel on board situated in Cardiff Bay. During the redevelopment of Cardiff Bay, the Cardiff Bay Development Corporation called together the churches in Cardiff to discuss the role of Christianity in the Bay. Lightship 2000 was the result of these discussions.

== History ==
The ship was launched in 1953 and from that year until 1989 it was a working lightvessel in a number of locations around the UK, ending its working life off Rhossili on the Gower Peninsula to warn of the Helwick Swatch, a treacherous sandbank. It was purchased in 1993 and refurbished as a floating Christian centre.

The ship closed in 2013 and in May 2015 it left Cardiff. It was planned to restore the ship, and for it to become a floating museum at Newnham on Severn.

== Chaplains ==
Rev'd Monica Mills, a United Reformed Church minister, served as chaplain of Cardiff Bay until early 2010. Mills died on 1 December 2010.

The Rev'd Peter Noble, former Moderator of Synod of the United Reformed Church Wales, took over the post of chaplain in March 2012.
