= Light float =

Floating lighted navigational aid

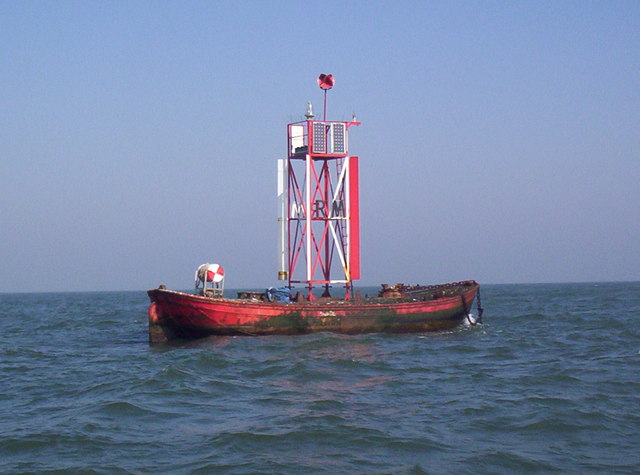
Roaring Middle light float, off King's Lynn at position 52° 58´·64N., 0° 21´·08E.

A light float is a type of lighted navigational aid forming an intermediate class between lightvessels and large lighted buoys; they are generally smaller than lightvessels and carry less powerful lights. In times when most lightvessels were crewed, the term was sometimes also used to describe a full-size lightvessel converted to unmanned operation.

Light floats usually have a boat-shaped platform: this was found to ride the strong tides of rivers and estuaries better than buoys. Light floats are still deployed instead of smaller lighted buoys in waters where strong currents may be experienced.
