= Fisher Bank =

Bank in the North Sea

Fisher Bank

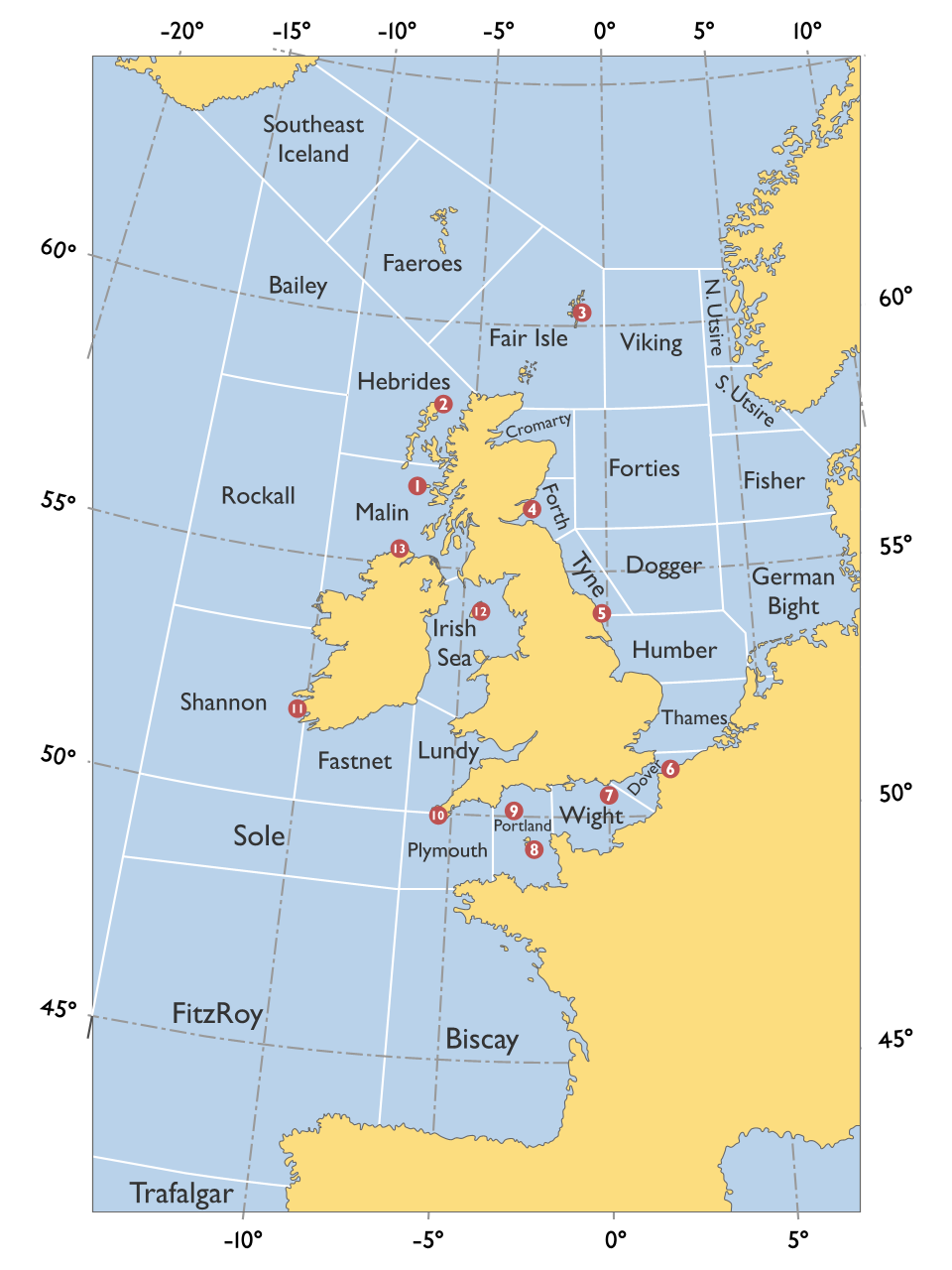
Map of North Atlantic and North Sea showing areas in the British Shipping Forecast and weather stations.

The Fisher Bank is a sand bank in the North Sea, off the west coast of Denmark. It consists of Great Fisher Bank, and Little Fisher Bank (the latter closer to Danish coast). Some older charts refer to them as the "Great Fishing Bank" and the "Little Fishing Bank". As Fisher it gives its name to one of the sea areas in the British Shipping Forecast.

== Location ==
Sea area Fisher is defined by the co-ordinates:

- 56°00'N 08°10'E
- 56°00'N 04°00'E
- 57°45'N 04°00'E
- 57°45'N 07°30'E
- 57°05'N 08°35'E

and the Danish coast.

== Character ==
As its name suggests, these large sandbanks provide rich fishing grounds, but overfishing has left them less productive than they were, and many Danish fishing vessels have moved elsewhere, into the North Sea or the Baltic.

== See also ==
- Dogger Bank for map and links to similar places
- Inner and Outer Dowsing sand banks
