= Light Vessel 16 =

1840 light vessel

History
- Owner: Trinity House (1840–1945); Benfleet Yacht Club (1945–1983); Various (1983–present)
- Builder: William Pitcher (Northfleet, Kent)
- Completed: 1840
- Fate: Currently (2024) in use as an Airbnb

General characteristics
- Type: Light vessel (as originally built)
- Tonnage: 158 gross
- Length: 26.67 m (87.5 ft) loa
- Beam: 6.4 m (21 ft)
- Depth of hold: 3.35 m (11.0 ft)
- Propulsion: None

Light Vessel 16 is a former Trinity House lightship originally stationed off Yorkshire, England. Built in 1840, she is the oldest surviving wooden lightship.

Light Vessel 16 served as a navigational aid off the British coast until 1945, when she was sold to Benfleet Yacht Club. The club converted her into a bar and clubhouse and moored her on Benfleet Creek. Light Vessel 16 was sold in 1983 and moved to the River Medway at Borstal, Kent. She was used as a private members' club and then a nightclub before becoming a bar and restaurant. She was renovated in 2007 and rented out as accommodation. Sold again in 2023, she is now used as an Airbnb.

== Light ship ==
Light Vessel 16 was built by the firm of William Pitcher in Northfleet, Kent, in 1840 for Trinity House who are responsible for the provision of maritime navigation aids in England and Wales. She was constructed using wood and has no means of propulsion, being designed to be towed into position and anchored. Light Vessel 16 measures 26.67 metres (87.5 ft) in overall length, with a 6.4-metre (21 ft) beam, hold depth of 3.35 metres (11.0 ft) and gross tonnage of 158.

Light Vessel 16 was positioned at the Spurn light station off Yorkshire until that station was taken over by the Humber Conservancy Board; she afterwards served at Calshot Spit, of Hampshire, and, from 1873, the Inner Dowsing sand bank off Lincolnshire.

== Private ownership ==
Light Vessel 16 was retired by Trinity House in 1945 and sold to Benfleet Yacht Club, who moored her in Benfleet Creek in Essex. She arrived with her original mast and light fittings. Light Vessel 16 was converted into a clubhouse by yacht club members, with a saloon bar fitted below deck in the stern and a meeting room at the front. In 1968 further work was carried out to convert the below decks into a single bar area and add a saloon bar to the top deck. By the early 1980s Light Vessel 16 had started to leak so the club decided to move to a structure on dry land.

Light Vessel 16 was sold and in 1983 was moved to Medway Bridge Marina on the River Medway at Borstal, Kent. She operated as a private members' club from 1984. After a period as a nightclub she operated as a bar and restaurant from 1989.

Light Vessel 16 underwent a renovation in 2007 and from 2009 was rented out for short-term accommodation. She was sold in 2023, at which point she was fitted with six en-suite double berths and two kitchen areas. After further restoration Light Vessel 16 now operates as an Airbnb.

Light Vessel 16 is the oldest surviving wooden lightship and is listed as part of the National Historic Fleet. She retains her original hull and floorboards but is missing some of her original wooden beams.
