= Royal Sovereign Lighthouse =

Former English lighthouse

Royal Sovereign
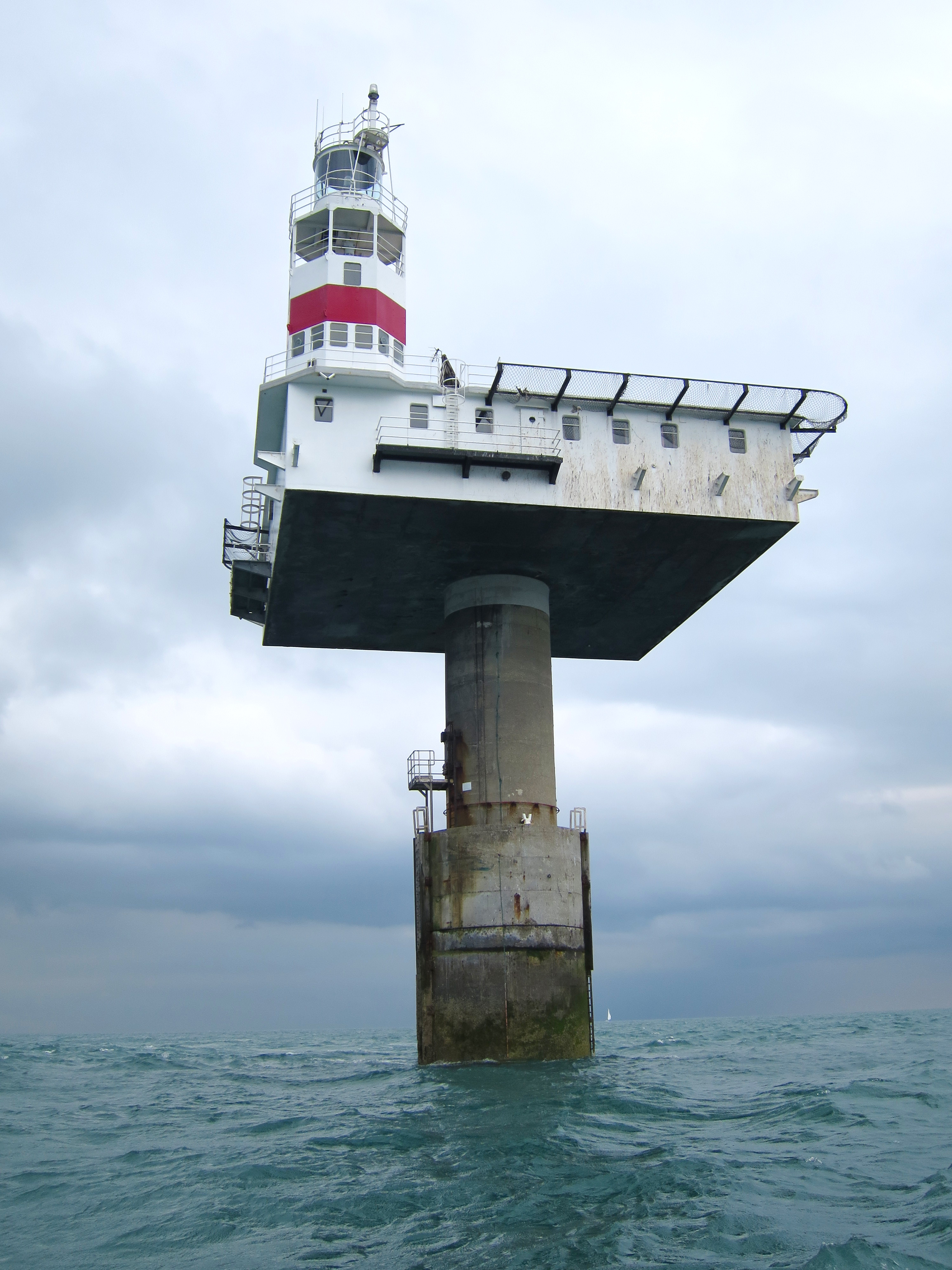
- Royal Sovereign Lighthouse in 2015
- Location: offshore Eastbourne; East Sussex; England
- Coordinates: 50°43′24″N 0°26′08″E

Tower
- Constructed: 1875 (lightship established)
- Construction: concrete column
- Automated: 1994
- Height: 36 m (118 ft)
- Shape: cylindrical column supporting an upper platform with tower
- Markings: white tower with a red band, white keeper's quarter
- Operator: Trinity House
- Fog signal: 2 blasts every 30s.

Light
- First lit: 1971
- Deactivated: 2022
- Focal height: 28 m (92 ft)
- Lens: Rotating three-panel 375mm catadioptric optic (original), biform tideland ML300 lanterns (current)
- Intensity: 3,976 candela
- Range: 12 nmi (22 km)
- Characteristic: Fl W 20s.

Royal Sovereign lighthouse was a lighthouse marking the Royal Sovereign shoal, a sandbank 11 km (6.8 mi) offshore from Eastbourne. The structure's distinctive shape was easily recognised as the lighthouse tower is perched above a large platform (which functions as a helicopter deck) supported by a single pillar rising out of the water. Originally, the platform was staffed by three full-time keepers, accommodation being contained in the 'cabin section' immediately below the platform. Additional accommodation was provided for up to four visiting maintenance workers.

== Construction and installation ==
The lighthouse replaced a lightship that had marked the Royal Sovereign Shoal since 1875. The structure was built, in two parts, on Newhaven beach, and put into position in 1970. First, the base and attached column were floated out to the shoal, where the hollow base was flooded and allowed to sink into position. Then the cabin section and superstructure were floated out, positioned over the base and allowed to settle on to the column as the tide fell. Afterwards the telescopic inner section of the column was jacked up, increasing its height by 13 metres (43 ft).

The lighthouse had a cellular concrete base 31 m × 31 m (101 ft 8 in × 101 ft 8 in) and 6 m (19 ft 8 in) high, when in position this was filled with gravel. The lower concrete column was 6 m (19 ft 8 in) diameter and 711 mm (28.0 in) thick, and an upper column 4.27 m (14 ft 0 in) diameter and 711 mm (28.0 in) thick. These supported a cabin deck 18.3 m × 18.3 m (60 ft 0 in × 60 ft 0 in) and 4.27 m (14 ft 0 in) high which included accommodation, workshops, engine rooms, etc. The roof of the deck provided a helipad.

== Operation ==
The lighthouse was brought into operation at noon on 6 September 1971, whereupon the lightship was towed away. Initially, the light source was a 1,000 watt bulb set within a revolving 3.5 order catadioptric optic, mounted in a superstructure on the corner of the platform. Beneath the lantern, on two intermediate levels, were the sounder, air tanks and associated equipment for the diaphone fog horn, below which the main control room was located (on platform-level). Power was provided by four 20 kW diesel generators, housed in the cabin section of the structure along with two diesel compressors (which, as well as supplying the fog horn, powered a crane on the platform). The optic completed one revolution per minute, thus displaying one flash every 20 seconds with a range of 28 nmi (52 km; 32 mi).

The light was automated in 1994. At the same time, the optic and lamp were replaced (reducing the range to 12 nmi (22 km; 14 mi)) and converted to solar-powered operation, and the fog horn replaced by an electric emitter. As of 2006 the light was controlled by a 475 MHz radio link to Trinity House managed by Vodafone; the platform was still occasionally occupied.

== Decommissioning ==
In June 2019, Trinity House announced that the lighthouse would be decommissioned, and then removed, because of the platform's deteriorating structural condition. Beachy Head light, the "principal aid to navigation in the area", will be upgraded. Having undertaken a site inspection in 2021, representatives of the Trinity House Board made it known that they intended to award the contract for removal in 2022 (once all necessary permissions had been sought), after which it was envisaged that the decommissioning would take place progressively over the course of three summers.

The lighthouse was permanently taken out of service on March 21, 2022, as issued under Admiralty navigational warnings:

211355 UTC Mar 22 ENGLISH CHANNEL. Beachy Head Eastwards. Royal Sovereign Lighthouse permanently discontinued and light-buoys temporarily established.

UK Coastal

WZ 380/22

211355 UTC Mar 22

ENGLISH CHANNEL.

Beachy Head Eastwards.

1. Cardinal light buoys temporarily established North, East, South, and West of Royal Sovereign Lighthouse, 50-43.5N 000-26.1E; South cardinal with AIS and Racon (T), North cardinal with fog signal.

2. Lighthouse permanently discontinued.

3. Cancel WZ 364.

At the time of its decommissioning, Ian McNaught, Deputy Master of Trinity House, observed it was not an easy decision for Trinity House to have decided to decommission the lighthouse. On 1 October 2023 the accommodation block was removed by heavy lift barge, the light tower having been lifted off previously and taken to Shoreham. The pillar is scheduled to be removed in 2024. The light tower has been donated by Trinity House to a community project in Bexhill-on-Sea as the focal point of a new "Maritime Coastal Environment Centre".

== See also ==
- List of lighthouses in England
