= Light Vessel 72 =

Derelict British lighthouse ship

Coordinates: 51.6504°N 3.8382°W

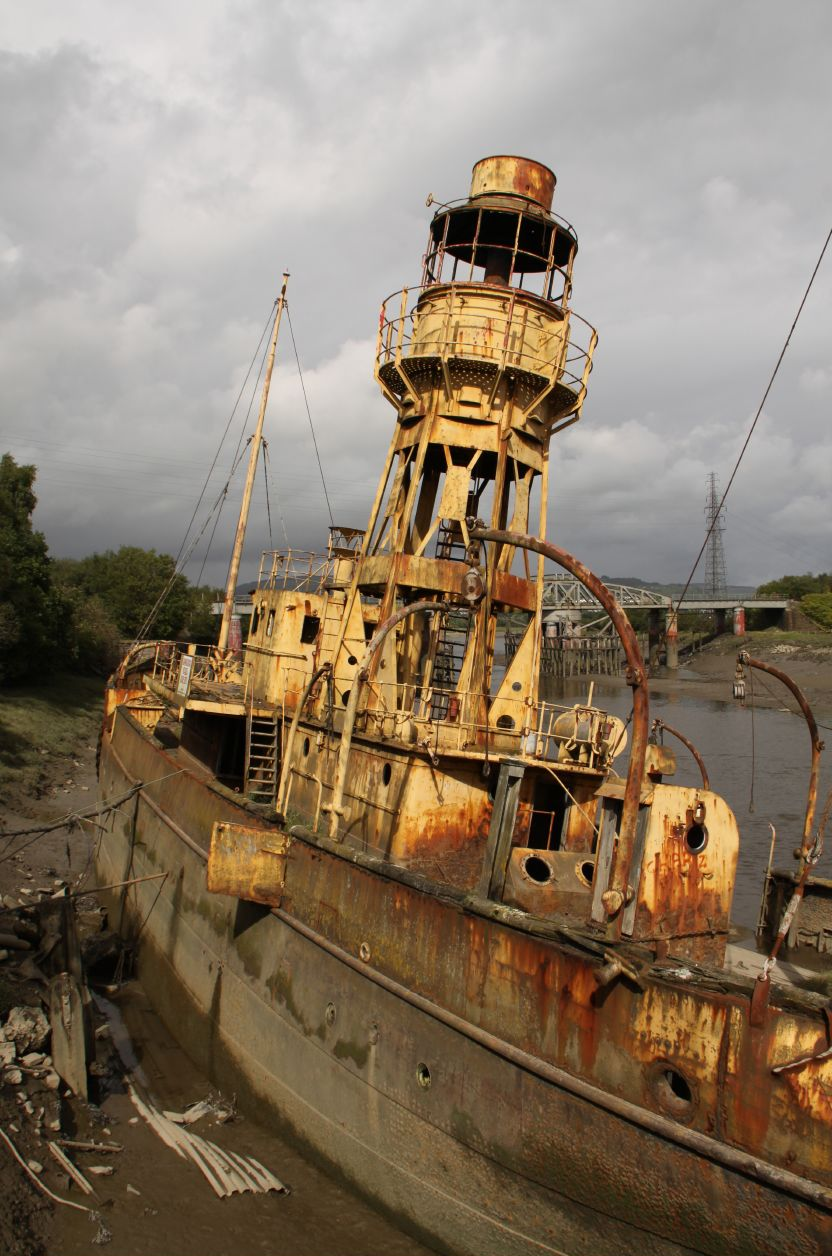
- Light Vessel 72 at Neath in 2010

History

United Kingdom
- Operator: Trinity House
- Builder: John Crown & Sons
- Completed: 1903
- Out of service: 1973
- Status: Laid up in Neath, Wales

General characteristics
- Type: Light vessel
- Tonnage: 257 tons
- Length: 115.93 ft (35.34 m)
- Beam: 24 ft (7.3 m)
- Depth: 10.98 ft (3.35 m)
- Decks: Wooden
- Propulsion: None

Light Vessel 72 (also known by its identification number LV72) was a light vessel of Trinity House, a British lighthouse authority. Constructed in Sunderland in 1903 she served as a navigational beacon in the British Isles until the Second World War. From 18 June 1944, in Operation Overlord, she was positioned off Normandy to mark the mineswept shipping lanes and the approaches to the Mulberry harbours. After the war she was deployed to several stations, lastly in the Bristol Channel until sold for scrap in 1973. Saved by the intervention of a scrapyard manager, she has lain on a mud bank in Neath, Wales, since. Groups from Sunderland made proposals to return her to where she was built, but the plan was never realised.

== Construction ==
Light Vessel 72 was built for Trinity House, the General Lighthouse Authority for England, Wales, the Channel Islands and Gibraltar. Constructed in Sunderland by John Crown & Sons in 1903, she had a hull of rivetted iron plates and a wooden deck. The vessel measured 115.93 ft (35.34 m) in length, 24 ft (7.3 m) in beam, and 10.98 ft (3.35 m) in depth, and had a gross tonnage of 257. For her role as a navigational aid, a tower in the midships was fitted with a paraffin lamp that could be seen up to 20 miles (32 km) away. As a light vessel, she was unpowered, relying on Trinity House tenders to tow her into position where she would anchor.

== History ==
Light Vessel 72 was deployed in service in the British Isles until the Second World War. She was anchored off the Normandy coast on 18 June 1944 as part of Operation Overlord, the Allied invasion of France. Light Vessel 72 served to mark the end time of the mineswept channels on the approach to Mulberry harbours. For this deployment she was marked with the letters "JUNO" on her hull, in reference to Sea Area Juno along Normandy Landings. Another Trinity House vessel, Light Vessel 68, was deployed off the American beaches at a station known as "Kansas" but was withdrawn to the United Kingdom in November 1944.

Light Vessel 72 remained on station until 27 January 1945 when she was withdrawn to Le Havre for repairs to damage caused by storms and collisions. She was placed on a new station, known as "Seine", in February but was withdrawn to Harwich, England, on 3 March after being replaced by the French light vessel Le Havre. The Allied naval commander Admiral Sir Bertram Ramsay recognised the contributions of the light vessels and associated buoys in a dispatch of September 1944 noting that "the great success achieved [in the invasion] was due in no small part to the contribution of Trinity House".

After the war Light Vessel 72 served in the Bristol Channel. She remained in service until sold for scrapping in 1973 to the Steel Supply Company in Neath, Wales. At the time of her sale she was the oldest vessel in the Trinity House fleet. The manager of the Steel Supply Company, Ian Jones, recognised her historic value and refused to break her up. The vessel has sat on a mud bank of the River Neath, adjacent to the scrapyard since. Light Vessel 72 has since deteriorated, some of its hull plates have warped, plants now grow on its deck and some of her brass fittings have been stolen. As one of the last remaining iron vessels she has historic interest and has been added to the National Historic Ships register (number 143).

In 2020 it was reported that experts who had surveyed the ship advised that the mud berth has helped to preserve its structure and only minor work would be required to float it. Although visible from a distance the ship is not publicly accessible, the adjacent land being privately owned.

== Proposed restoration ==
Several plans have been put forward for the restoration of the vessel. At one point it was considered for conversion into a night club and at another stage was almost sold to a youth club in Marseille. In 2016 a campaign ("Save our Ship of Light") was launched to purchase and restore the ship, at an estimated total cost of £100,000, and return it to Sunderland. This was unsuccessful. The owners have indicated their asking price for the vessel is £40,000.
