= Light Vessel 95 =

1939 ship in London

Coordinates: 51°30′29.1″N 0°00′33.0″E

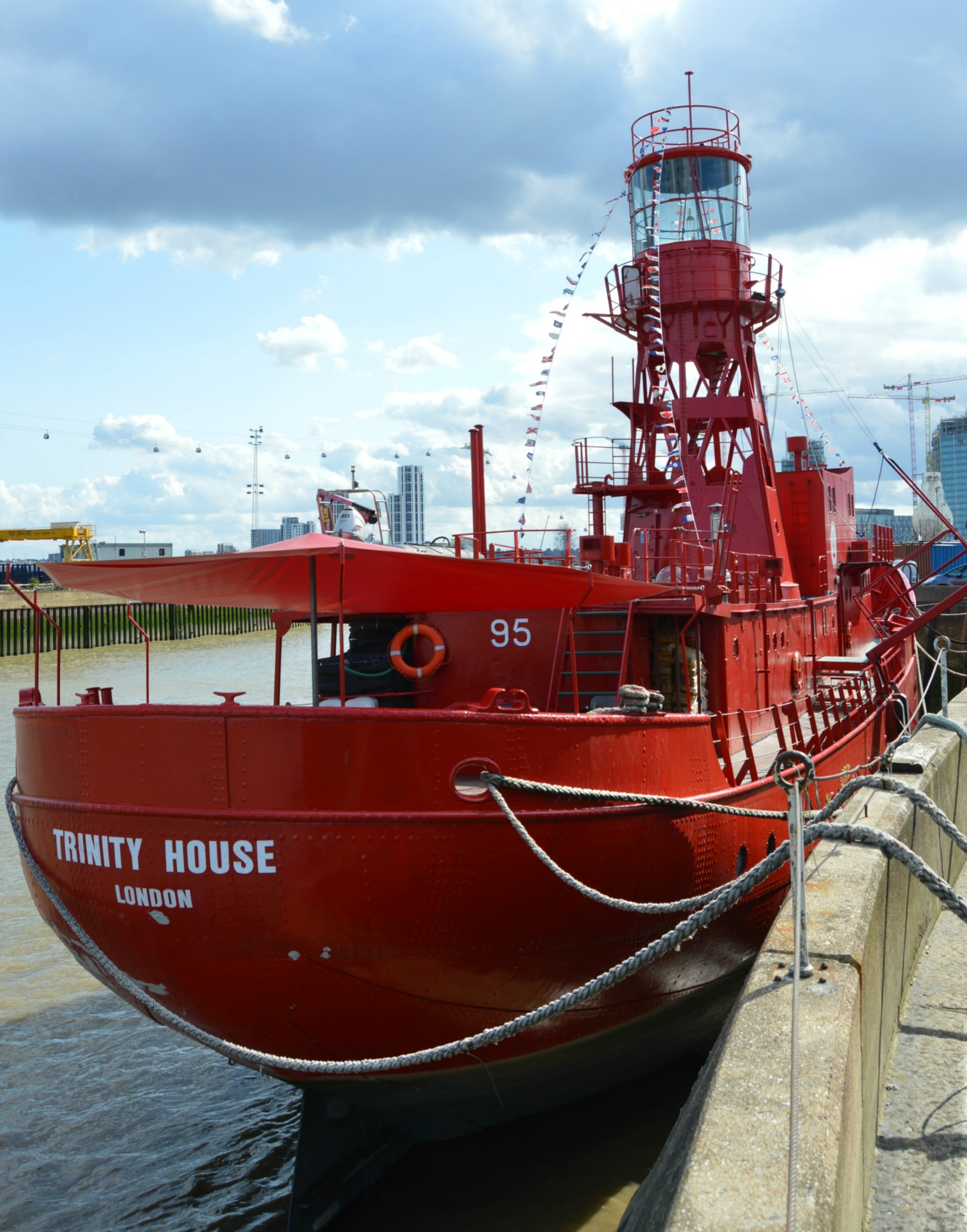
Stern view, 2017

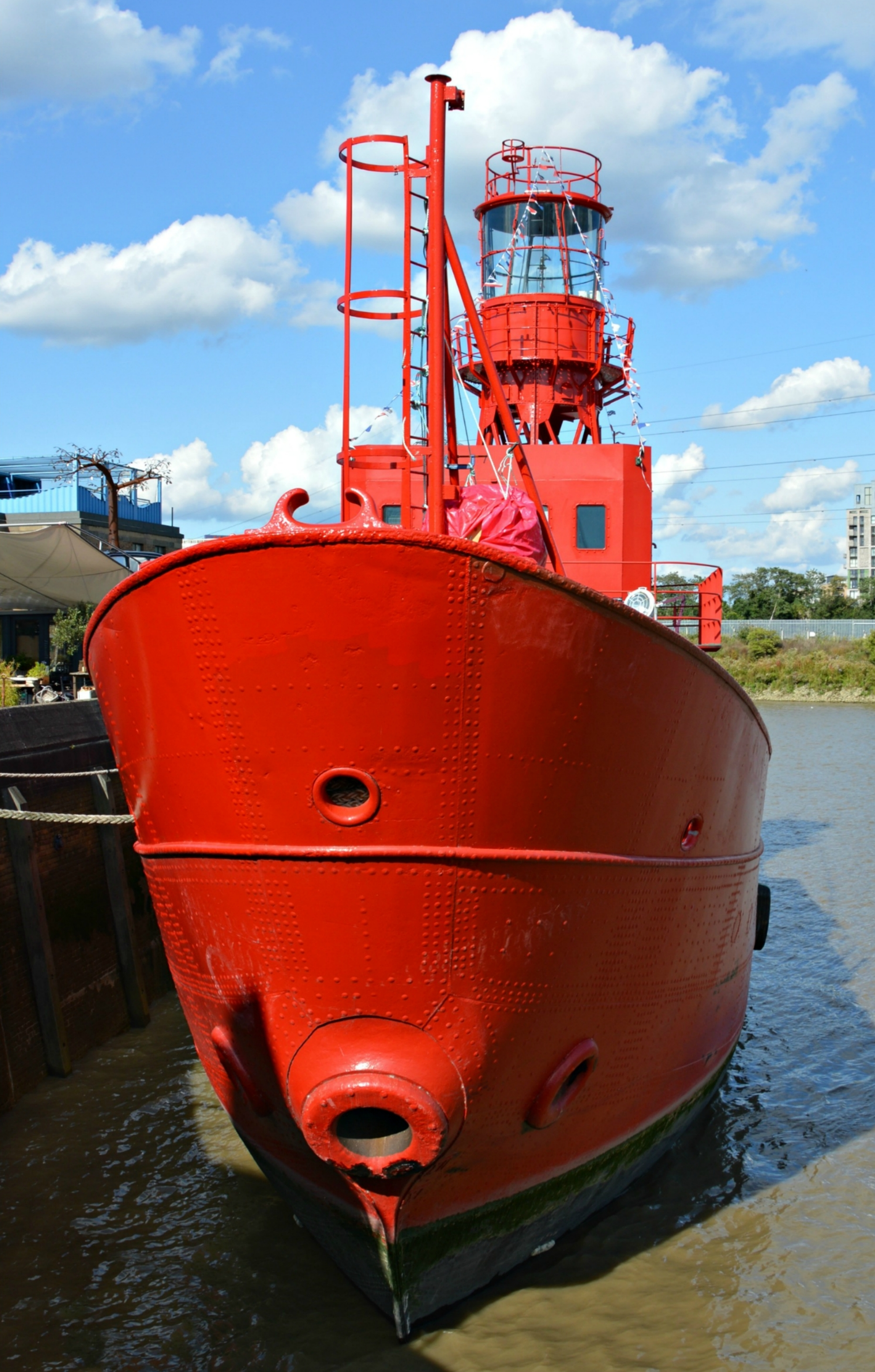
Bow view, 2017

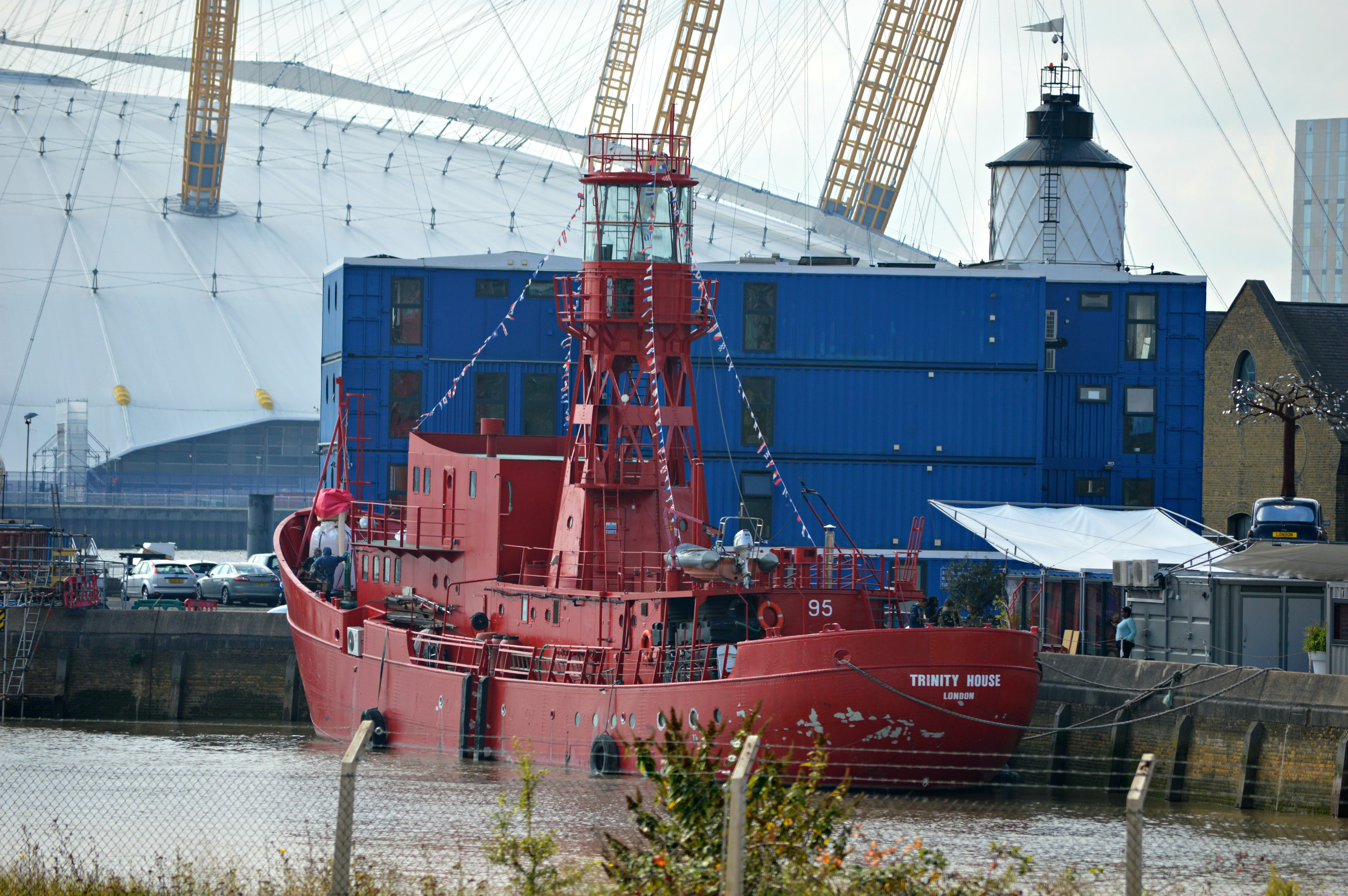
In 2017, Millennium Dome behind

Light Vessel 95 (known as Lightship 95) is a former lightship that has been used as a recording studio since the early 2000s. She was built by Philip and Son at Dartmouth, Devon, in 1939 for Trinity House, the body responsible for provision of maritime navigation aids in England and Wales. Light Vessel 95 served at Goodwin Sands, The Wash, Varne Bank and at the Sevenstones Station. She was among the last ten light vessels in Trinity House service and was converted to automatic operation in the 1990s. Light Vessel 95 was sold in 2003 and converted into a recording studio. Since 2008 she has been moored at Trinity Buoy Wharf in London.

== Trinity House service ==
Light Vessel 95 was a member of the Nineties class of lightvessel built by Philip and Son at Dartmouth, Devon, from 1936. She was produced for Trinity House, the body responsible for provision of maritime navigation aids in England and Wales. Light Vessel 95 was the last of her class to be completed (in 1939) before production was suspended by the Second World War. Production resumed after the war but the numbering scheme was restarted, with the first post-war ship being Light Vessel 1; a further 22 of the Nineties class were produced. Light Vessel 95 had a displacement of 550 tons.

Light Vessel 95 operated mainly on the South Goodwin station (of Goodwin Sands near Kent), but also at Inner Dowsing (near The Wash) and on the Varne Bank off Kent. On the night of 1/2 December 1966 Light Vessel 95 was operating at the Varne station in a force 10 gale when she dragged her anchor for 0.75 miles (1.21 km) and was almost wrecked on shoals. By the time the Trinity House tender Siren reached her the next day, in worsening weather, she was 2 miles (3.2 km) off station and close to a shoal. The Dover lifeboat took off the crew by midnight, despite sustaining heavy damage during the rescue. The crew returned to Light Vessel 95 the next day as weather improved and the vessel was eventually returned to her station. By 1978 Light Vessel 95 was serving on the Sevenstones Station near Seven Stones Reef off Cornwall.

Light Vessel 95 was one of the last ten light vessels to be operated by Trinity House. She became the first to be converted to solar power in the 1990s when she switched to automatic (uncrewed) operation. The original manual machinery and crew accommodation were removed during a refit in 1999.

== Later use ==
Light Vessel 95 was taken out of service in 2003 and sold to the owner of the Port Werburgh Marina at Hoo, Kent. The vessel was sold again to Ben Phillips who converted it to a recording studio. The ship's large diesel tank was converted to a control room, the engine room became the live room and two recording studios were housed in other compartments. The thick hull helped to prevent airborne sound transmission and the live room and control room are isolated from the rest of the structure to prevent direct sound transmission. The works were carried out on the Medway and in London and took 18 months.

Since 2008 the ship, now branded Lightship 95, has been moored at Trinity Buoy Wharf, a former Trinity House facility now operated by the London Docklands Development Corporation. Phillips ran the studio until 2017, when operations were taken over by Soup Studios. Since 2021, the studio has been operated by Dave Holmes and Giles Barrett. Artists who have recorded on Lightship 95 include Lana Del Rey, Ed Sheeran and Bastille.
