= Royal Sovereign shoal =

Shoal in English Channel off East Sussex

Royal Sovereign shoal Wide Mouth shoal
- underwater shoal or reef
- Interactive map of Royal Sovereign shoal
- Coordinates: 50°44′50″N 0°26′0″E
- Grid position: TV 720 960
- Location: English Channel
- Geology: sandstone and chalk

Area
  - Total: 1.0 km^{2} (0.39 sq mi)

Dimensions
  - Length: 1.5 km (0.93 mi)
  - Width: 1.5 km (0.93 mi)
- Highest elevation: 3.5 m (11 ft) below chart datum
- Marked by buoys, formerly by light vessel and lighthouse

The Royal Sovereign shoal (50°44’50”N 0°26’0”E) is an area of shallow water located in the eastern English Channel five miles (8 km) offshore and due south of Bexhill. The shoal comprises an outcrop of sandstone and chalk rising to a height of 3.5 m below chart datum. It occupies an area of about one square kilometre,1 km^{2}. The shoal is reputedly named after HMS Royal Sovereign which was wrecked on the reef in 1757. As a hazard to shipping the shoal has been marked by light vessels (1875-1971), a lighthouse (1971-2022) and now by buoys.

== The shoal ==
=== Geology ===
The Royal Sovereign shoal comprises Upper Greensand sandstone with an outcrop of chalk in the north west. The reef rises from the seabed of gravel, mud and sand with a water depth of 15 m below chart datum to a depth of 3.5 m below datum. At the shallowest part it comprises bedrock slabs and flat top boulders. At the south end it comprises smooth un-fissured bedrock. To the west other sandstone shoals are Horse of Willingdon, Elphick Tree and Long Shoal. The Royal Sovereign shoal experiences tidal currents of up to 2.6 knots (1.3 m/s).

=== Biology ===
Animals on the reef include sponges, sea squirt, Nemertesia, bryozoans, starfish, tubeworm, soft coral, cuckoo wrasse, ballan wrasse, bib, blenny, poor cod and anemones.

== The name ==
The shoal is reputedly named after HMS Royal Sovereign which was wrecked on the reef in 1757. However, there is evidence that HMS Royal Sovereign was in Chatham dockyard at the time, the identity of the wrecked ship is unknown.

Another account states that HMS Victory, returning from the battle of Trafalgar, was nearly wrecked on the reef, which was given the name Royal Sovereign after Admiral Collingwood’s flag ship HMS Royal Sovereign.

It is also known as the Wide Mouth shoal.

== Navigation aids ==
It is estimated that during the eighteenth and nineteenth centuries 600 ships were wrecked on the Royal Sovereign shoal. The effective marking of the shoal for navigation was essential.

Prior to 1875 the shoal was marked by a bell buoy.

A light vessel named Royal Sovereign was established on the shoal in 1875. The vessel was of steel and timber composite construction. It was the first light vessel to have a flashing light, there were three successive flashes at a one-minute interval, in 1877 this was changed to three quick flashes every 45 seconds. A new light vessel on the Royal Sovereign shoal was commissioned on 25 September 1928.

=== Lighthouse ===
The increasing cost of maintaining light vessels led Trinity House to examine other options. The use of a light tower for Royal Sovereign was considered and designs prepared 1966-68. The lighthouse was commissioned on 6 September 1971 and was staffed until it was automated in 1994. The lighthouse was located 2.0 km south of the shoal.

The lighthouse was decommissioned in 2022 and has been removed to onshore for recycling and reuse. There are plans to build a Maritime Centre in Bexhill with the Royal Sovereign lantern tower as a focal point.

=== Buoys ===
Since the decommissioning of the lighthouse in 2022 the Royal Sovereign shoal is marked by a South Cardinal buoy Q(6)+LF1.5s Bell Racon(T), and the Royal Sovereign red can buoy Q.R.

== See also ==
- Lightvessel stations of Great Britain
