= Lightvessels in Ireland =

Lightvessels in Ireland describes any lightvessel or light float previously stationed off the coast of Ireland. The Commissioners of Irish Lights are responsible for the majority of marine navigation aids around the whole of the island of Ireland.

== Lightvessels ==
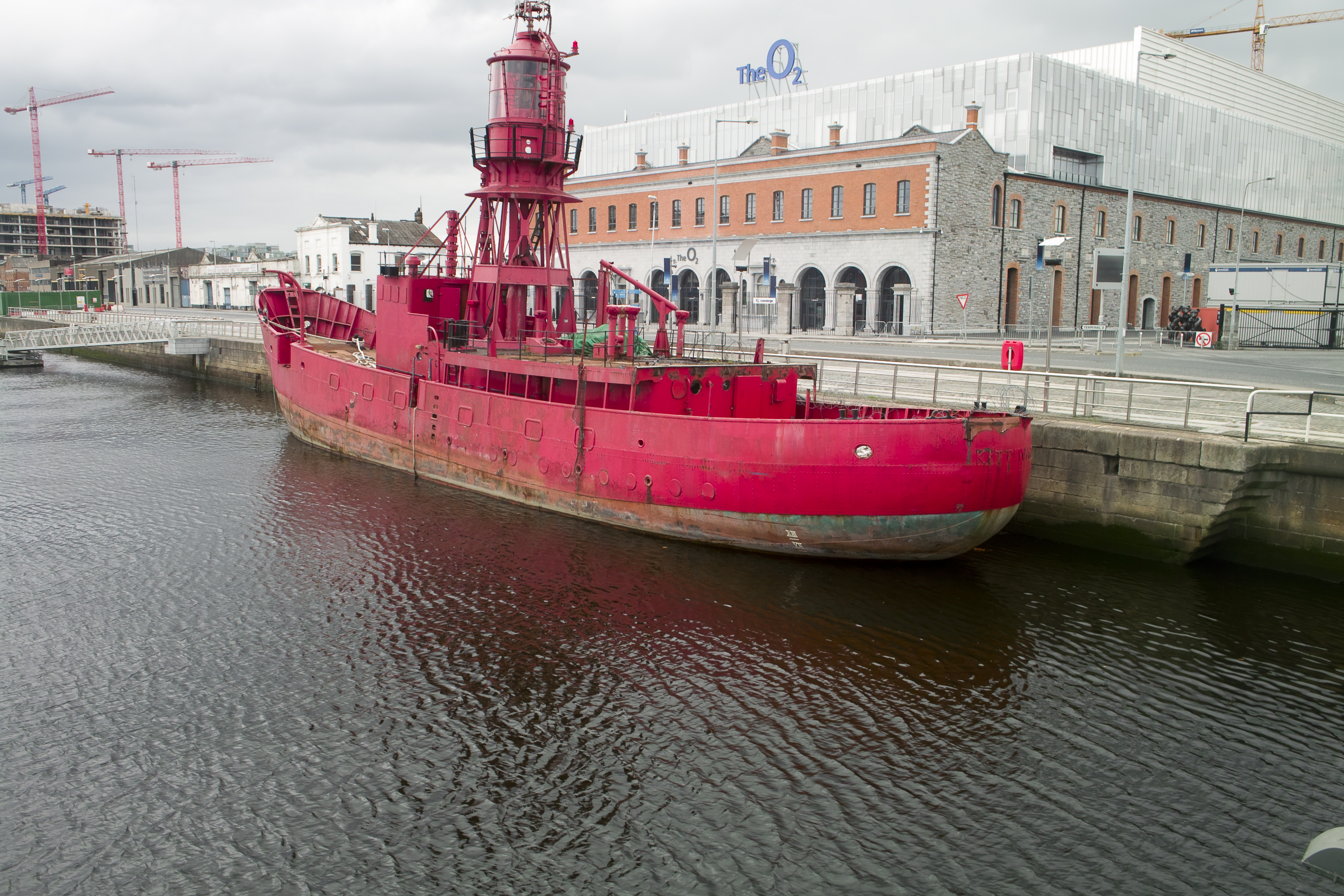
Kittiwake lightvessel for sale in 2009 moored in River Liffey

- Guillemot: built 1921-23 – sold 1968 – set in concrete as the Kilmore Quay Maritime Museum retains much original equipment and fittings. Scrapped during 2011.
- Kittiwake: built 1955 – Removed from station in 2009 and replaced with a superbuoy. Sold, then docked in Dublin's River Liffey and in 2022 removed from Alexandra Basin to be restored and placed on public display in a new docklands heritage project.
- Osprey: built 1953-55 – sold 1975 – now known as Le Batofar, a nightclub/pub moored on the Seine in Paris
- Petrel: built 1913-15 – sold 1968 – club house for Down Cruising Club in Ballydorn
- Puffin Lightvessel, Roche's Point, County Cork – washed away in 1896

Name	Built	By	Where	Length	Breadth	Depth	Frame	Decks	Cost £	Withdrawn	Fate	Notes
Palmer's Light	1735	—	—	—	—	—	—	—	—	1768		Replaced by Poolbeg Lighthouse
Richmond	1806	—	—	—	—	—	Oak	Oak, teak and elm	1,500	1826	Broken up	
Seagull	1824	W. Roberts	Milford Haven	67	20	9 1/2	Oak	Oak, teak and elm	1,659	1864	Sold	First purpose-built lightvessel
Star	1825	W. Roberts	Milford Haven	67	20	9	Oak	Oak, teak and elm	1,841	1855	sold	
Relief	1826	W. Roberts	Milford Haven	67	20	9 1/2	Oak	Oak, teak and elm	1,841	1867	Sold	
Brilliant	1832	Brady's	Dublin	67	20	9 1/2	Oak	Oak, teak and elm	1,983	1867	Sold	
Seagull II	1853	Charles Hill & Sons	Bristol	82	21	11	Oak	Oak, teak and elm	3,651	1867	Sold.	
Petrel	1854	Charles Hill & Sons	Bristol	82	21	11	Oak	Oak, teak and elm	3,800	1867	Sold.	
Brilliant II	1856	Wheeler	Cork	82	21	11	Oak	Oak, teak and elm	3,200	1913	Sold.	
Star II	1857	Wheeler	Cork	82	21	11	Oak	Oak, teak and elm	3,200	1862	Sold.	
Star III	1862	Charles Hill & Sons	Bristol	91	21	10	Oak	Oak, teak and elm	4,189	1911	Sold and scrapped.	
Relief II	1863	Charles Hill & Sons	Bristol	91	21	10	Oak	Oak, teak and elm	4,189	1925	Sold.	
Gannet	1865	Charles Hill & Sons	Bristol	91	21	10	Oak	Oak, teak and elm	4,189	1928	Sold and scrapped.	when stationed at DAUNT, run into by Largo Bay, in 1884
Comet	1867	J & W Dudgeon	Cubitt Town, London	91	21	10	Composite ship Wrought iron	Teak	5,750	1905	Sold and scrapped.	
Shamrock	1867	Walpole, Webb & Bewley	Dublin	96	21	10	Oak	Oak, teak and elm sheathed with muntz metal.	5,125	1936	Sold	day markers were introduced
Osprey	1868	Walpole, Webb & Bewley	Dublin	96	21	10	Wood	Wood	5,125	1915	Sold.	
Albatross	1875	Fletcher & Farnall, Millwall	London	91	21	10	Wood	Wood	5,625	8 September 1902	Salvaged and sold.	Run down and sunk on Kish by RMS Leinster.
Cormorant	1878	Victoria Shipbuilding Co	Passage West, Cork	91	21	11	Iron	Two thicknesses of 3-inch (76 mm) teak, sheathed with muntz metal	7,500	1942	Salvaged and sold.	Renamed Lady December and moored at Hoo, Near Rochester, Kent.
Torch	1881	Milford Haven Co	Milford Haven	91	21	11	Iron	Two thicknesses of 3-inch (76 mm) teak, sheathed with muntz metal	8,100	1945	Sold and scrapped.	
Puffin	1887	Schlesinger Davis & Co	Wallsend	91	21	11 1/4	composite	composite	6,000	8 October 1896	Salvaged, beached at Rushbrooke, scrapped on beach.	Sank during storm on Daunt, 8 October 1896, crew of 7 lost.
Shearwater	1894	Allsup & Sons	Preston	96	22 2/3	11 3/4	Steel sheathed with teak	Teak sheathed with muntz metal;	7,900	1955	Sold and scrapped.	watertight bulkhead
Guillemot	1894	Allsup & Sons	Preston	96	22 2/3	11 3/4	Steel sheathed with teak	Teak sheathed with muntz metal;	7,900	28 March 1917	Sunk by a German submarine	crew survived
Kittiwake	1898	Allsup & Sons	Preston	96	24	12	Steel sheathed with teak	Teak sheathed with muntz metal;	7,900	1956	Sold and scrapped.	first to have an engine to work the windlass and the first fitted with oil engines for the siren
Seagull	1901	Allsup & Sons	Preston	96	24	12	Steel sheathed with teak	Teak sheathed with muntz metal;	7,900	28 March 1917	Sunk by a German submarine	Crew survived
Fulmar	1904	J. Reid	Glasgow	96	23	12 1/4	Steel	Iron	6,600	1964	Sold for scrap	Five watertight bulkheads
Comet II	1904	J. Reid	Glasgow	96	23	12 1/4	Steel	Iron	6,740	1965	Became Radio Scotland	Crew rescued by RNLB Mary Stanford 1936
Penguin	1910	Dublin Dockyard	Dublin	100	24	12 1/4	Steel	Iron	7,230	1966	renamed Hallowe'en, as a Youth Adventure Sea Training Vessel	1995 Maritime Museum at Inveraray Pier
Tern	1912	L. Hawthorn & Co	Leith	102	24	13 1/4	Steel	Iron	7,420	1967	Sold and scrapped	Wireless
Petrel	1915	Dublin Dockyard	Dublin	102	24	13 1/4	Steel	Iron	10,310	1968	Club House for Down Cruising Club, Strangford Lough	now privately owned
Guillemot	1923	Cran & Somerville	Leith	102	24	12 1/2	Steel	Steel	17,700	1968	now Wexford Maritime Museum	Set in concrete at Kilmore Quay. Scrapped in 2011.
Albatross	1925	H. Robb Ltd	Leith	102	24	13 1/4	Steel	Iron	15,650	1970	sold to Scouting Association of Ireland	now privately owned in Arklow
Gannet	1954	Philip and Son	Dartmouth	134	25	15	Steel	Steel	95,200	still in service	as an automatic light float	
Osprey	1955	Philip & Son	Dartmouth	134	25	15	Steel	Steel	98,100	1975	Sold	Moored on the Seine, Paris as the Batofar Restaurant
Shearwater	1955	Philip & Son	Dartmouth	134	25	15	Steel	Steel	98,100	1976	Sold for scrap	
Kittiwake	1959	Philip & Son	Dartmouth	134	25	15	Steel	Steel	124,128	2005	Sold	moored beside O2 (Point Depot), Dublin
Skua	1960	Philip & Son	Dartmouth	134	25	15	Steel	Steel	124,128	2005	Rotting at the North Quay of Arklow Harbour	The "Blue Planet" charity are seeking restoration funds
Cormorant	1964	Charles Hill & Sons	Bristol	133	26 1/2	19 1/2	Steel	Steel	145,750	1983	Sold	

== Lightvessel stations ==
- Coningbeg, off the Saltee Islands, 14 km from the County Wexford coast, was established in 1824 and replaced on 26 February 2007 with a "Superbuoy"

== See also ==
- Lighthouses in Ireland
- Lightvessel stations of Great Britain
- List of lightvessels of Great Britain
- List of lighthouses and lightvessels

== Gallery ==
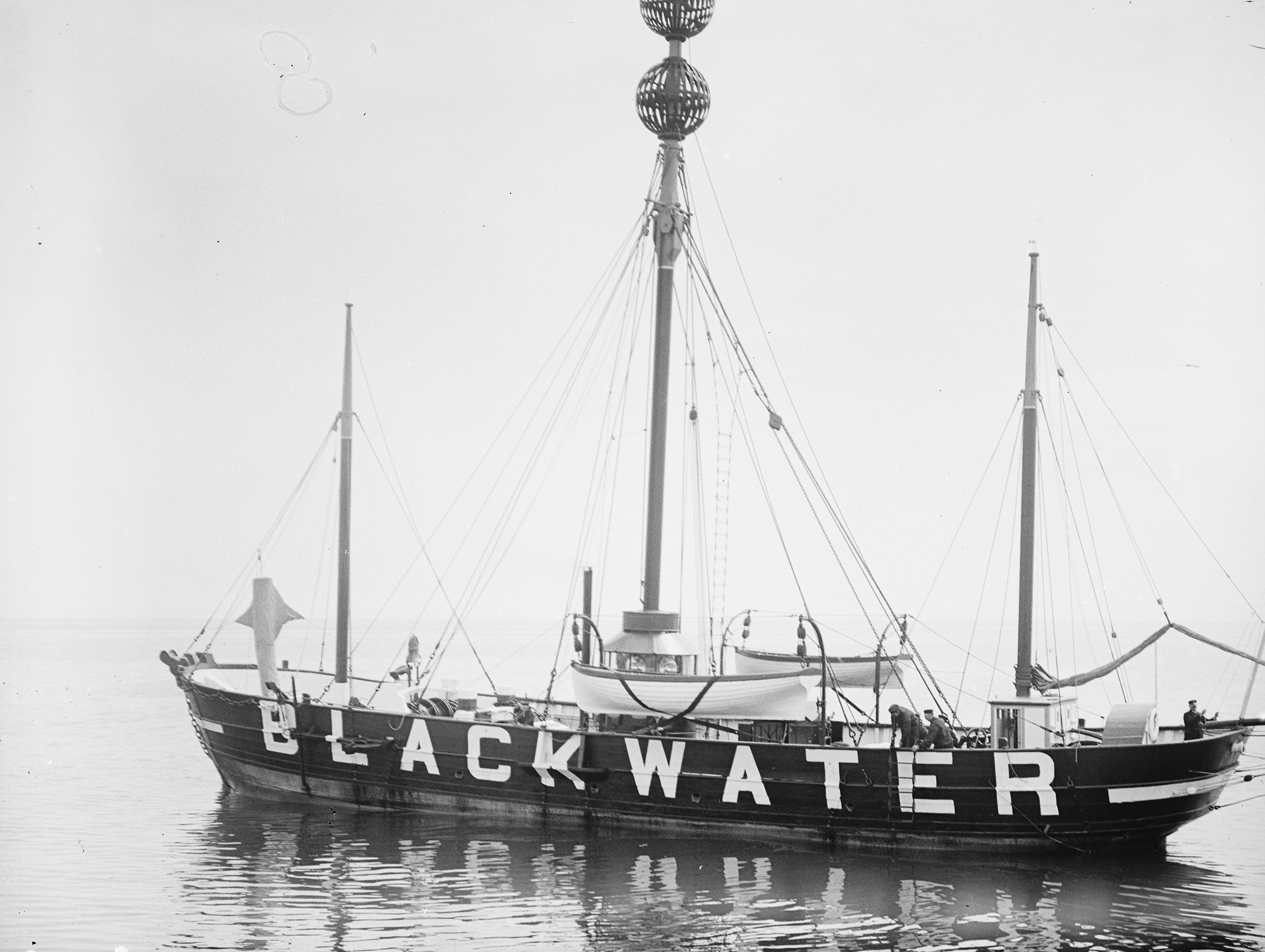
Lightvessel on the Blackwater station, c.1890-1909

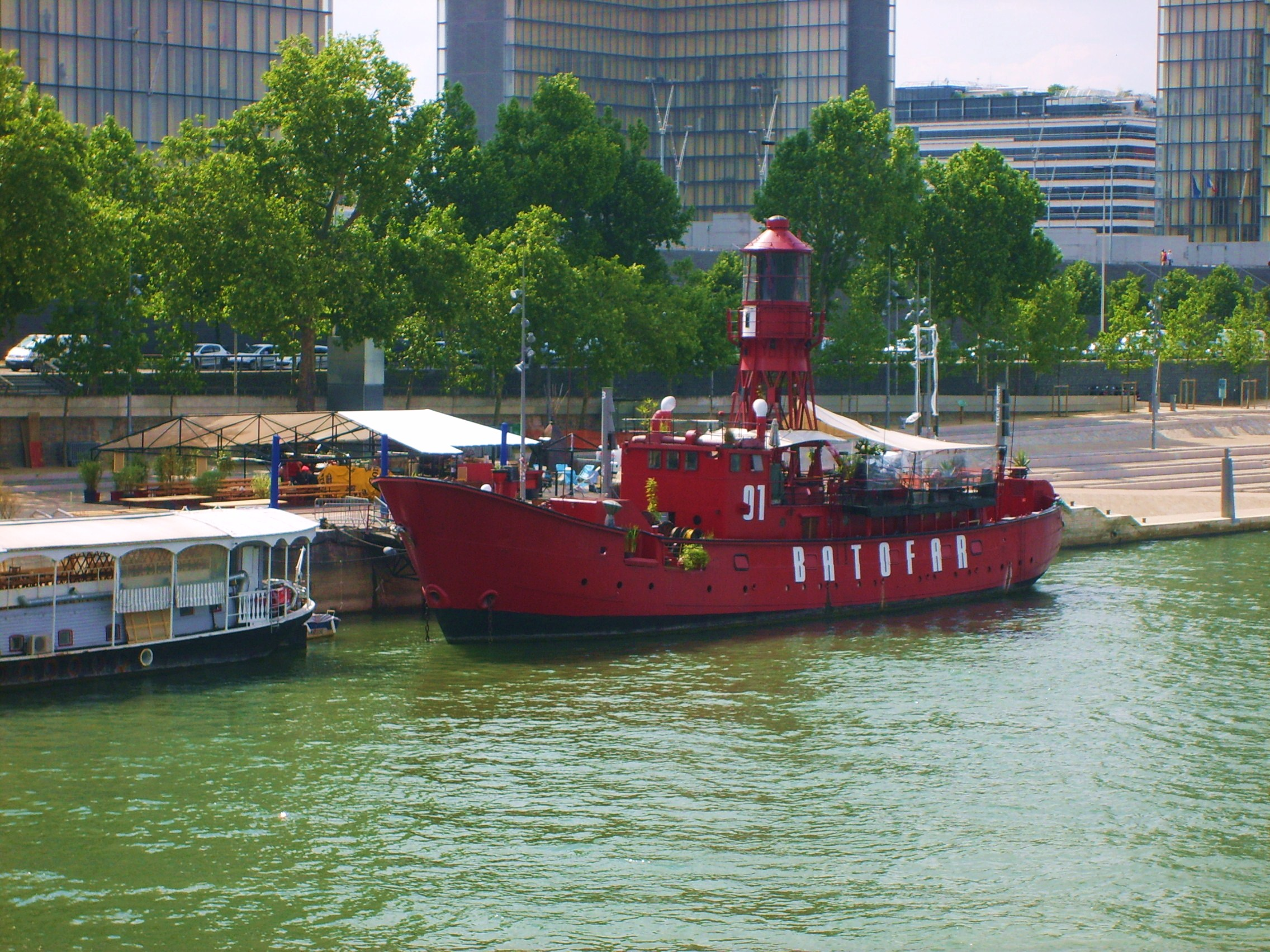
LV Osprey, now a Parisian nightclub moored on the Seine, Paris

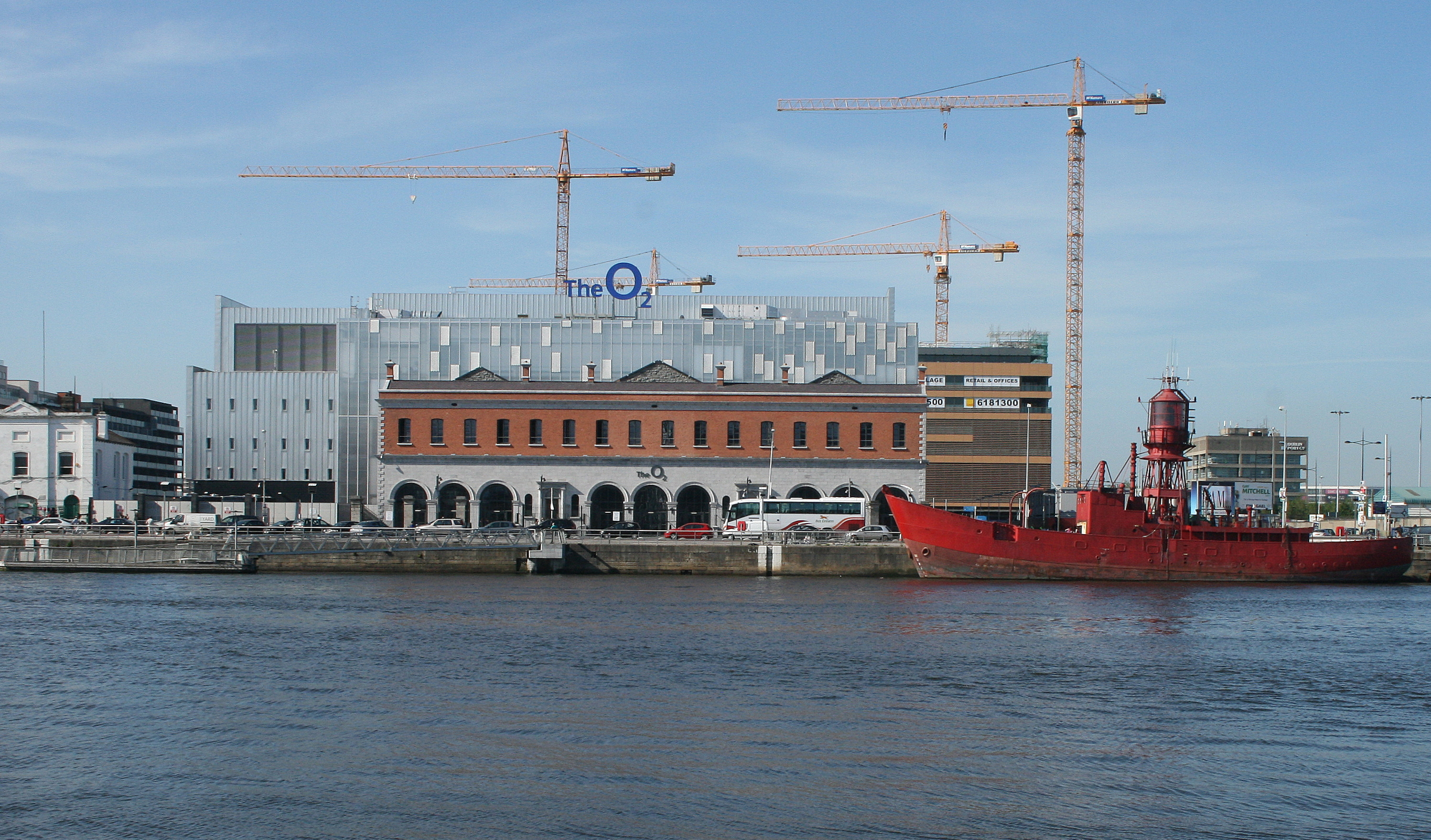
LV Kittiwake, moored on the Liffey, Dublin

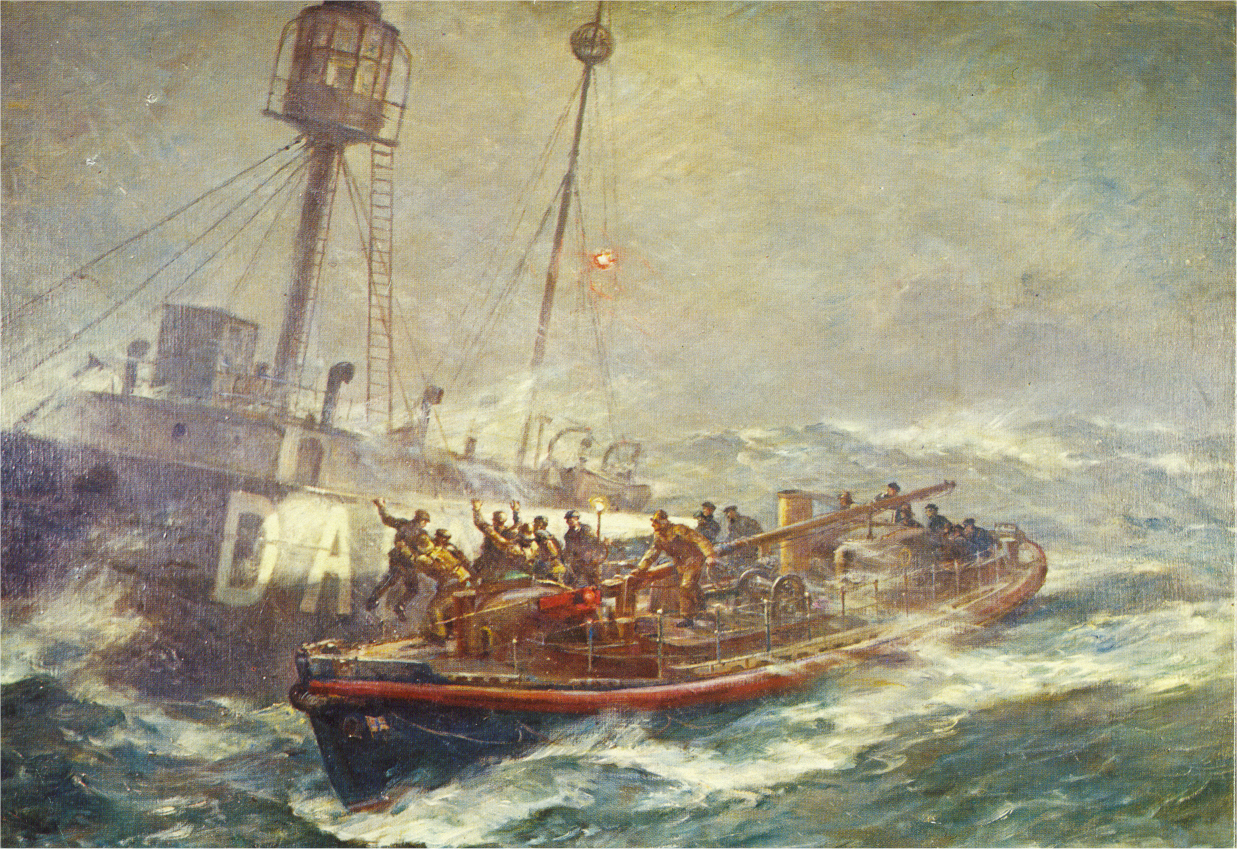
Oil painting by Bernard Finnigan Gribble of the rescue of the crew of LV Comet by RNLB Mary Stanford 1936

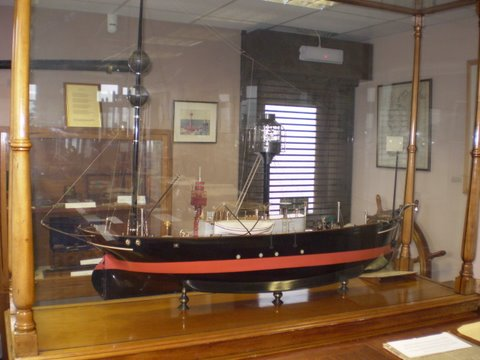
A model of LV Petrel.
Note the day marker on the mast.

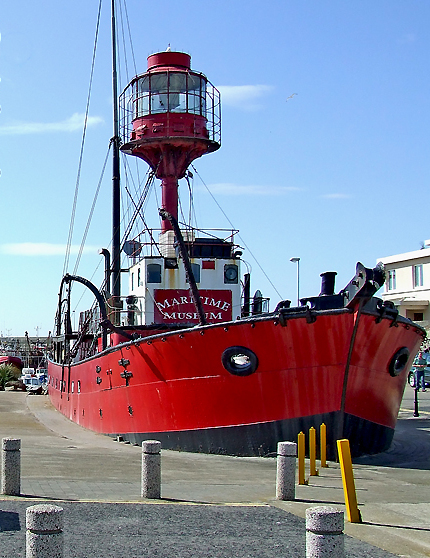
LV Guillemot 'berthed' in concrete at Kilmore Quay as a maritime museum.
