= RNLB Mary Stanford =

RNLB Mary Stanford may refer to:

- RNLB Mary Stanford (ON 661), based at Rye Harbour, Sussex, 1916 - 1028
- RNLB Mary Stanford (ON 733), based at Ballycotton, County Cork, 1930 - 1959
