= Naomh Éanna =

Naomh Éanna may refer to:

- Enda of Aran, or Saint Enda (Irish: Naomh Éanna)
- MV Naomh Éanna, a former Irish ferry
- Naomh Éanna GAA (Gorey), an Irish hurling, Gaelic football and camogie club

== See also ==
- Saint Enda's Park, in Dublin, Ireland
- St Enda's GAA (disambiguation)
