= RNLB Mary Stanford (ON 733) =

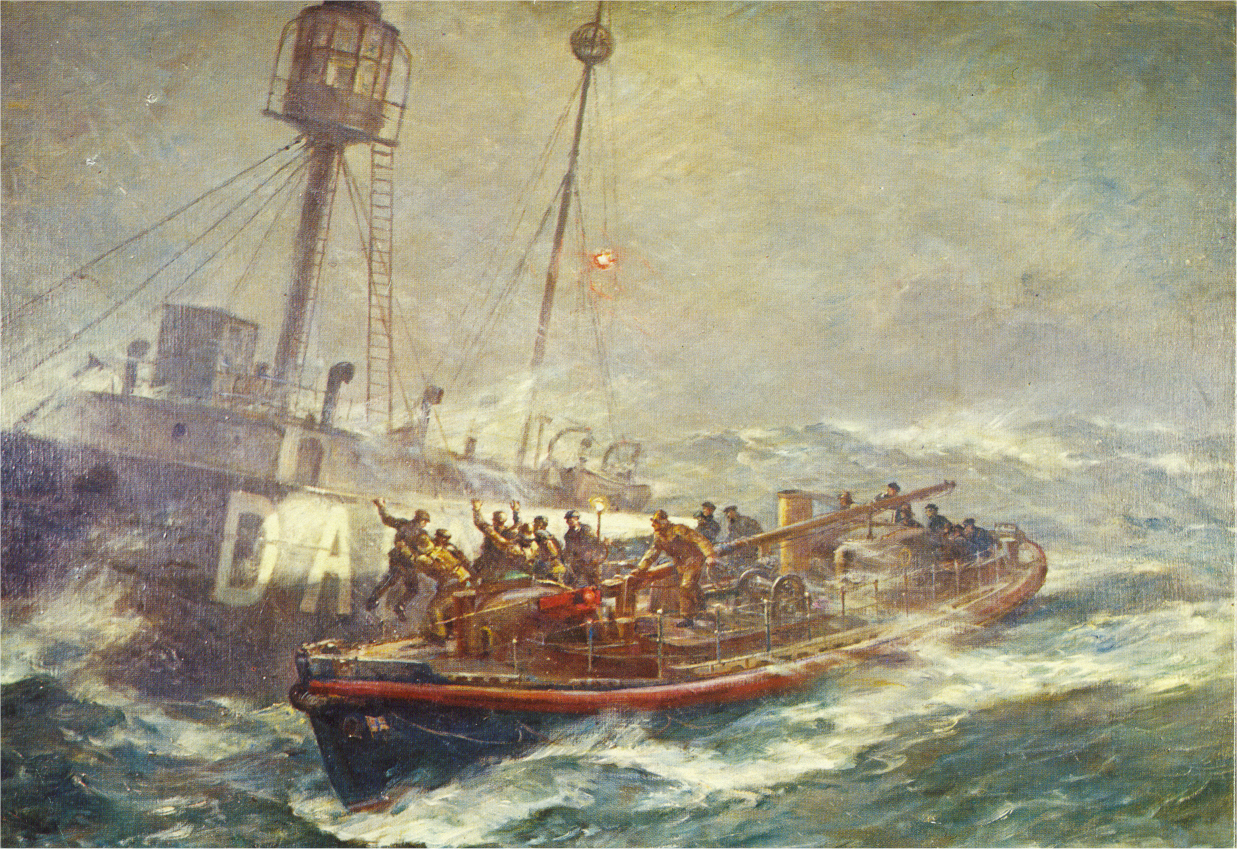
- Oil painting by B. F. Gribble of the rescue of the crew of the Daunt Lightship by the Mary Stanford. It was depicted on a 1974 Irish postage stamp marking the RNLI's 150th anniversary

History

RNLI Flag
- Name: Mary Stanford
- Owner: RNLI
- Builder: Saunders Roe Ltd, Cowes.
- Cost: £9,402-15s–11d
- Christened: 7 July 1931
- Completed: 22 July 1930
- Maiden voyage: 17 September 1931
- In service: 1930
- Out of service: 1959
- Identification: ON733
- Fate: Restored by The Mary Stanford Project
- Donor: John Frederick Stanford, London.
- Station: Ballycotton

General characteristics
- Class & type: Barnett
- Tonnage: 2
- Length: 51 ft
- Installed power: 2 x six-cylinder 60hp Weybury C.6 petrol engines running at 1,200 rpm
- Sail plan: Auxiliary sail
- Speed: 8.88 knots
- Capacity: 100
- Crew: 12
- Notes: Saved over 100 lives

RNLB Mary Stanford (ON 733) was the Ballycotton Lifeboat from 1930 to 1959. Ballycotton is on Ireland's southern coast, a trade route to the Americas. There are many dangerous rocks and shallows with on-shore prevailing winds. Ballycotton has a long tradition of life-saving. Mary Stanford had 41 rescues, or "shouts", and saved 122 lives. She performed the notable Daunt Lightship rescue on 11 February 1936. After her withdrawal from service she lay for some years in a backwater of Dublin's Grand Canal Dock, but has now been returned to Ballycotton and restored.

== Ballycotton ==
The Royal National Lifeboat Institution (RNLI) established a lifeboat station in Ballycotton in 1858. There is a long history of life saving at Ballycotton. The first acknowledged by the Royal National Institution for the Preservation of Life from Shipwreck, as the RNLI was then called, was when they awarded a silver medal in 1826. On 21 December 1825, the vessel Britannia was wrecked in Ballycotton Bay. Her master, the only survivor, lashed himself to a rock. There he remained for seven hours. In spite of the danger, a local man, Dennis Cronen rowed out and rescued him and then sheltered him in his cottage for four days.

There were many early rescues by coastguards.

== RNLI ==
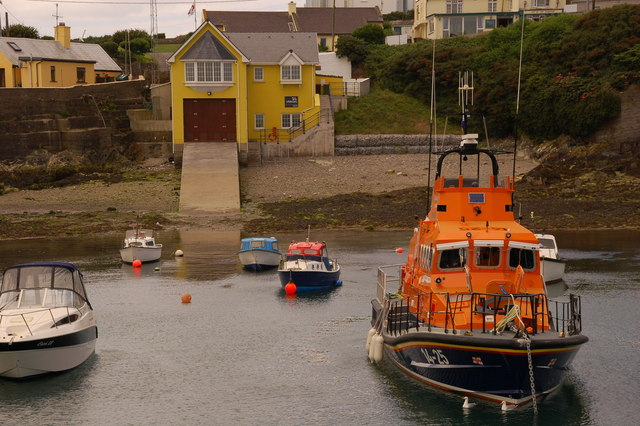
The lifeboat Austin Lidbury in 2006, and lifeboat station opened in 2002

The need for a purpose-built lifeboat was evident. The boat was delivered in time for the visit of the Prince of Wales, Albert Edward in 1858. The lifeboats prior to the Mary Stanford were all powered by oars and sail. As ships became larger the need for a motorised craft was realised. On 12 December 1928, the RMS Celtic was wrecked at Roche's Point, Queenstown (later Cobh). At the time of her launch in 1901, she was the largest ship in her day, one of the "Big Four", the first to exceed 20,000 tons, dwarfing the Ballycotton Lifeboat, which came to the rescue.

The Mary Stanford was named on 7 July 1930 by Mrs. Louisa Cosgrave, wife of President Cosgrave. The cost, £11,000, was covered by a donation from John Frederick Stanford of London. There was a previous lifeboat, named Mary Stanford. Two years earlier, it had capsized with the loss of all 17 crew in Rye Harbour, England. The new Mary Stanford would be more fortunate. She would save many lives, including the famous rescue of the Daunt Lightship.

== Daunt Lightship Puffin ==
Daunt Rock has always been a hazard to shipping. The first lightship was stationed there by the Irish Lights Board in 1864 following the wreck of the City of New York on the rock. Lightvessel Puffin took up this duty. There was a severe gale on 8 October 1896 and the Puffin vanished. The wreck was not found until a month later, on 5 November 1896. The remains of the crew were never located. In folklore they remain at their post, as a ghost ship, appearing to warn of impending danger.

== Daunt rescue ==
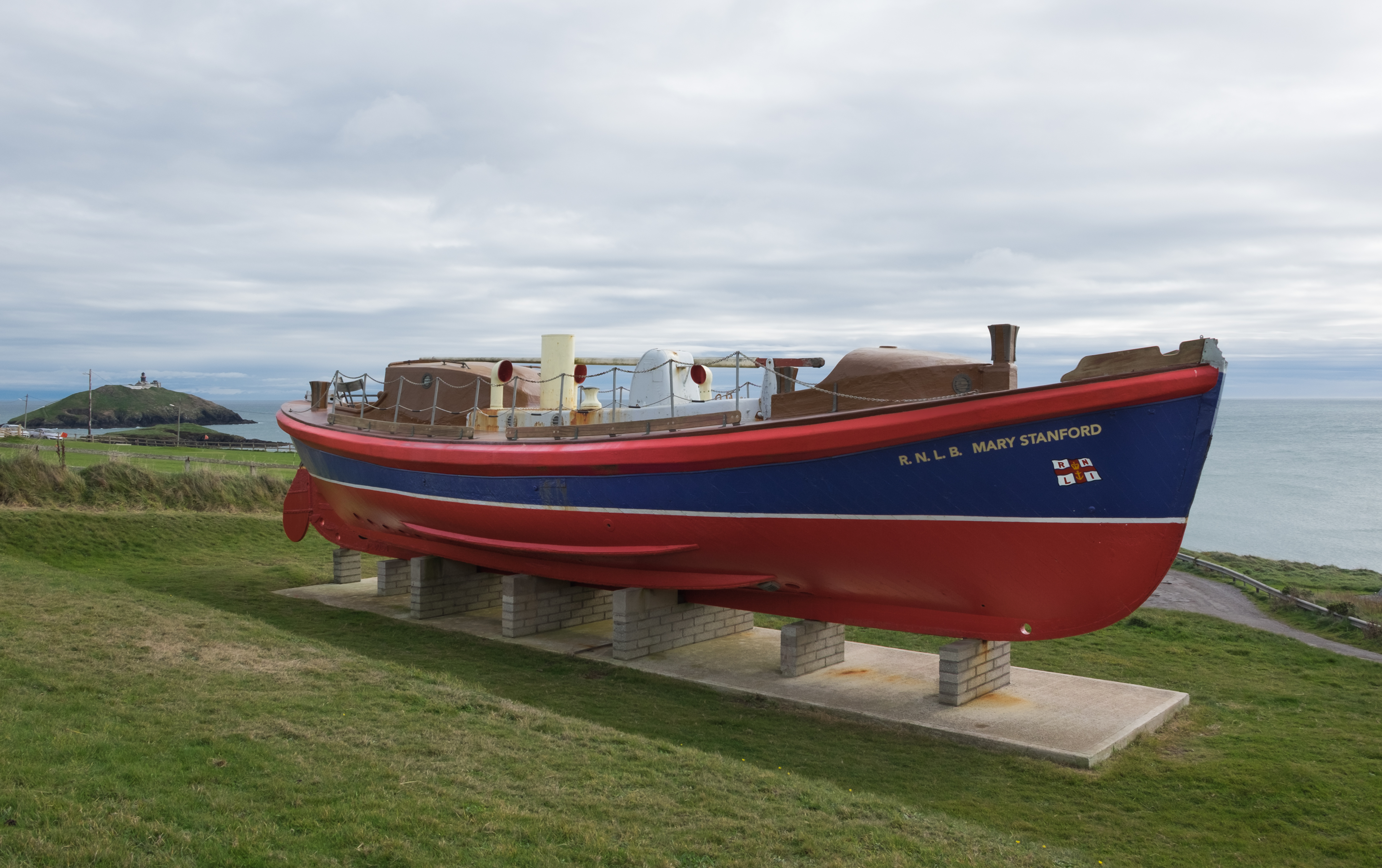
The preserved Mary Stanford in Ballycotton in 2018

On 10 February 1936 a south-eastern gale, with rain and snow, developed into a hurricane. Mountainous waves were crashing over the pier and breakwater transforming the harbour into a seething cauldron, the spray was flying over the lantern of the 196-foot-high (60 m) lighthouse; "stones, some a ton in weight, were being torn from the quay and flung about like sugar lumps". At 8 am next morning an SOS was received: the LV Comet, on station at Daunt rock, had broken from her moorings and was drifting dangerously. Without waiting for orders, in horrendous conditions, Coxswain Patrick ("Patsy") Sliney took Mary Stanford to sea. Comet was not at Daunt rock, she was riding at anchor a quarter-mile away. Other ships arrived, but dared not approach the Comet in such conditions. Although heavy and built for endurance, the Comet was being tossed around by the waves and was risk to other ships.

Mary Stanford made several attempts to get a steel cable aboard the Comet. Every time they did, a large wave crashed the ships further apart and the cable snapped. When darkness fell, Mary Stanford headed for Cobh to get stronger cables. The Innisfallen (1930–1940) and HMS Tenedos (H04) stood by. The Lifeboat crew had been all day without food. They ate, slept for three hours and received a change of clothing. Early next morning (Wednesday) Mary Stanford returned to Daunt rock. The sea was just as stormy. It was now enveloped by a thick fog, and it was impossible to effect a rescue. The lifeboat remained in the storm all day and all night. The Commissioners of Irish Lights vessel ILV Isolda had arrived and stood by while Mary Stanford went to Cobh at 7 am to refuel, and promptly returned.

That evening, the storm increased. Comet drifted closer to Daunt rock. When she was 60 yards from the rock, as darkness approached, the Coxswain decided the only option was to try to get alongside and for the crew to jump for the lifeboat. He knew the dangers. On the first attempt, one man got on board, on the second attempt no one jumped; a third time, and five men were safe. The lifeboat went in a fourth and fifth time, but no more were able to make it. Two men were still on board, clinging to the rails, too exhausted to jump. On the sixth attempt, as the Mary Stanford came alongside, the two were seized by the lifeboat crew and dragged aboard. (This moment was depicted on an Irish postage stamp)

They then went to Cobh and disembarked the rescued at 11 pm and then returned to Ballycotton. Mary Stanford had been away for 79 hours. The crew had only three hours sleep during the 63-hour rescue (from leaving Ballycotton to disembarking Comet's crew at Cobh), they all suffered from colds, saltwater burns and hunger.

An RNLI Gold Medal was awarded to Coxswain Patrick Sliney, Silver Medals to Second Coxswain John Lane Walsh and Motor Mechanic Thomas Sliney, and Bronze Medals to Crew Members Michael Coffey Walsh, John Shea Sliney, William Sliney and Thomas Walsh. This rescue became famous, and was depicted by marine artists. and featured in popular books.

=== Commemorative postage stamp ===
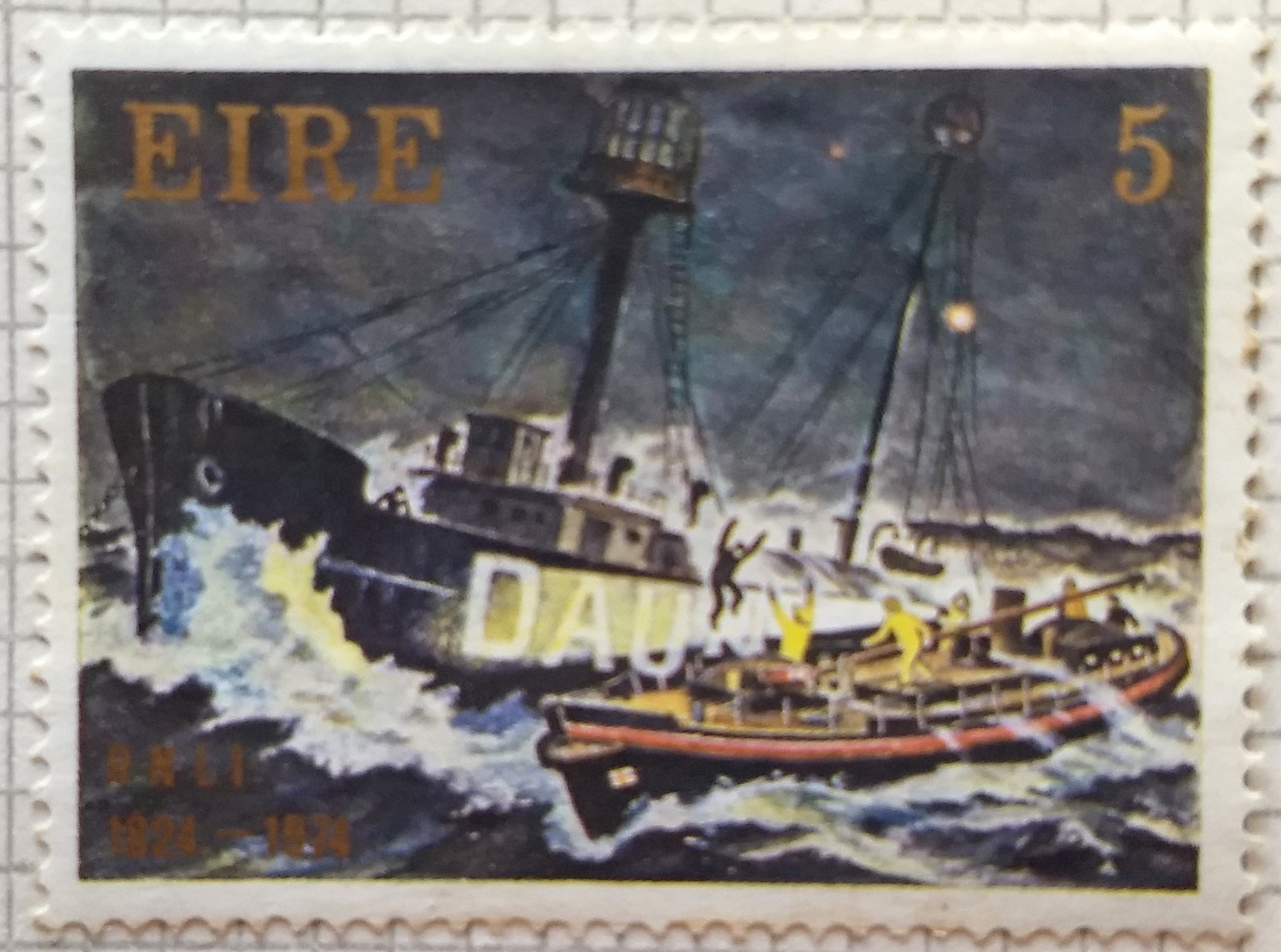
Ballycotton lifeboat Mary Stanford commemorated on an Irish postage stamp issued in 1974

When a postage stamp was issued by the Irish postal service to commemorate the 150th anniversary of the RNLI, a portrait of this rescue was chosen. The design of the stamp was based on the painting by Bernard Gribble, which depicts the last two lightshipmen being pulled onto the lifeboat.

== Other rescues ==
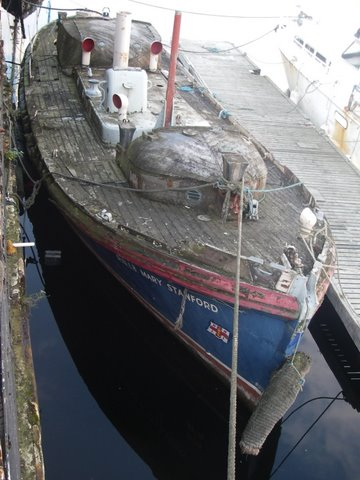
Languishing in Grand Canal Dock

Mary Stanford had many other rescues to her credit. The years of the Emergency during World War II were difficult. There was a serious risk from drifting mines. On 27 January 1941 a mine exploded on the Ballycotton shore, demolishing the curate's house and smashing the windows in the church.

Rescues which merited RNLI medal were:

- On 30 January 1941, there was a strong wind, thick fog and drifting mines. The eight-man crew of the SS Primrose of Liverpool were rescued just as she was sinking. A bronze medal was awarded.
- On 23 December 1943, the Irish Ash was in difficulties. This rescue took 30 hours. They managed to bring the ship to safety in Cobh. One silver and two bronze medals were awarded.

Some rescues involved the Cliff Rescue Team. On 1 February 1947, the Irish Plane was driven onto rocks below cliffs, west of Ballyshane. The Mary Stanford did not launch that as little could be done in the weather conditions so close to the shore. The crew of the Irish Plane were rescued by the Cliff Rescue Team.

== Epilogue ==
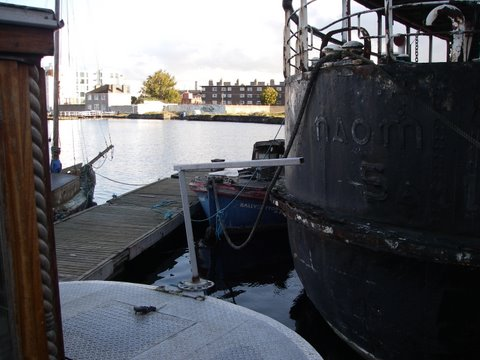
Naomh Éanna and Mary Stanford

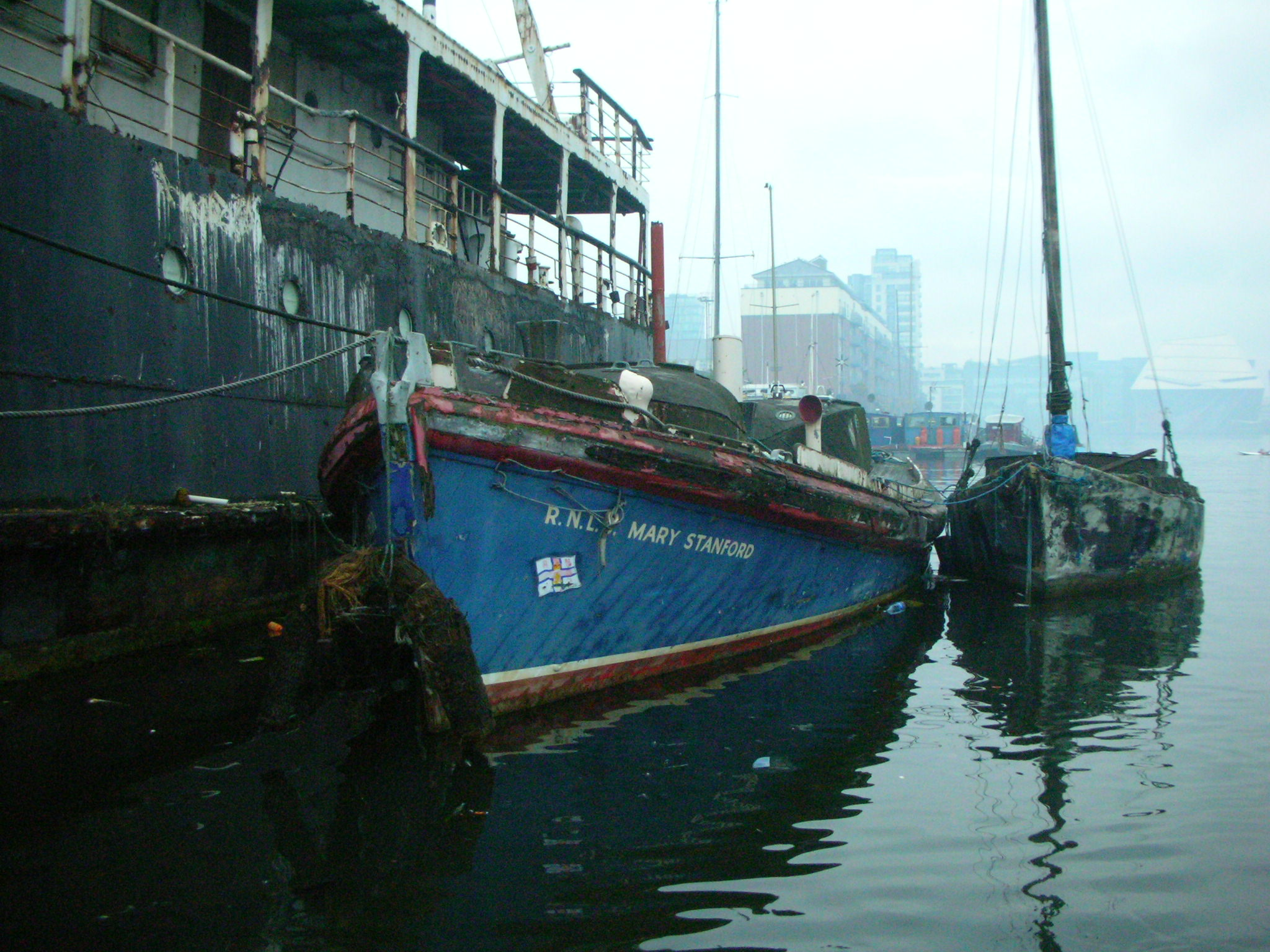
Mary Stanford, October 2011

Mary Stanford retired and on 16 September 1959 and was replaced by Ethel Mary. Lifesaving continues at Ballycotton; there have been many callouts, including during the 1979 Fastnet race. Up to 2002, seventeen RNLI Medals have been awarded to Ballycotton lifeboatmen; two gold, seven silver, and eight bronze. Since March 1998, Ballycotton has been served by Trent Class lifeboat Austin Lidbury.

The Daunt Lightship Comet survived. After she was sold, she became Radio Scotland, a Pirate radio station.

Coxswain Patsy Sliney retired in 1950, he had taken part in the rescue of 114 lives and was awarded Gold, Silver and bronze medals.

Mary Stanford was a reserve lifeboat from 1959 until 1969 when she was sold to the Limerick Harbour Commissioners, where she served as a harbour pilot launch until the mid-1980s. An organisation called the "Irish Nautical Trust" announced plans to establish a floating museum in Grand Canal Dock. They were given a number of historic craft on the understanding that they would be preserved. Without funding the work was abandoned. Subsequently, further boats were refused admission to the dock without assurance that they would be preserved. Mary Stanford lay for some years in Hanover Dock, a backwater of Grand Canal Dock, beside Naomh Éanna which served the Aran Islands.

A group was formed to return Mary Stanford to Ballycotton by April 2014 where, after restoration work, she was put on display.

== Effective services ==
Effective Services
Date	ship	home port	action	saved
17 September 1930	Fishing Yawl Boozer	Ballycotton	saved yawl	2
19 October 1930	Steam Trawler Phineas Beard	London	assistance	
10 August 1931	Yacht Ailsa	Southampton	assisted to harbour	
26 March 1932	Steam Trawler Macaw	Milford	stood by	
27 October 1932	Fishing Boat St. Mary and a punt	Ballycotton	escorted	
15 December 1934	Steamship Lady Martin	Dublin	escorted	
11 February 1936	Daunt Rock lightvessel Comet			8
2 May 1936	Steam Trawler Evaristo Perez	Vigo	assistance	
2 May 1936	Steam Trawler Teresa Camposa	Vigo	assistance	
16 May 1937	Ketch Garlingstone	Milford Haven	stood by	
2 January 1939	Motor Drifter Yankee Girl	Ballycotton	escorted	
30 July 1939	Motor Fishing Boat Point Girl	Ballycotton	saved boat &	4
23 August 1940	Motor Fishing Boat Point Girl	Ballycotton	saved boat &	4
19 November 1940	Steamship Nestlea	Newcastle	landed	22
20 November 1940	Steamship Nestlea	Newcastle	helped	
20 November 1940	Steamship Nestlea	Newcastle	saved a boat	
30 January 1941	Steamship Primrose	Liverpool	saved	8
29 April 1941	Ship's boat		saved boat	
12 March 1942	Ship's raft		saved raft	
15 December 1942	Steam Trawler Dereske	Milford Haven	assisted	
23 December 1942	Steamship Irish Ash	Dublin	saved vessel &	35
23 January 1943	Fishing Boat Emily	Ballycotton	saved boat &	4
15 January 1945	Drifter Ptide of Rosslare	Dunmore East	escorted	
26 April 1945	Fishing Boat Emily	Ballycotton	saved boat &	2
6 November 1947	Steam Trawler East Coast	Milford Haven	assisted to save vessel &	9
12 September 1949	Yacht Betty	Cork	escorted	
11 October 1949	Daunt Rock lightvessel		landed injured man	
10 January 1950	Irish torpedo boat M4		gave help	
8 February 1950	Steamship Joseph Mitchell	London	saved	13
11 December 1950	Fishing punt	Ballycotton	saved boat &	2
13 March 1952	Motor punt	Ballycotton	escorted	
6 August 1952	Fishing boat Rapid	Ballycotton	gave help	
10 September 1952	Fishing boat Irish Leader	Dublin	saved boat &	2
10 September 1952	Fishing boat St Mary	Ballycotton	gave help	
9 July 1953	Fishing boat Irish Leader	Dublin	gave help	
26 October 1954	Schooner Windermere	Dublin	escorted	
4 June 1955	Fishing boat Inis Caol	Dublin	saved boat &	2
16 November 1955	Fishing boat Maid of Loughshinney	Dublin	saved boat &	2
15 January 1956	Fishing boat St Mary	Cork	saved boat &	2
4 April 1958	Fishing boat Pride	Helvick	saved boat &	3
10 June 1958	Fishing boat	Ballycotton	saved boat &	1
10 June 1967	Fishing boat Cait	Schull	gave help	
Source: appendix 3 Leach, Nicholas (2009). Ballycotton Lifeboats. Landmark Publishing. ISBN 978-1-84306-472-5.

== Bibliography ==
- Leach, Nicholas (1 May 2005). The Lifeboat Service in Ireland. The History Press. ISBN 0-7524-3509-4.
- Leach, Nicholas; O'Driscoll, Brendan (June 2009). Ballycotton Lifeboats – 150 Years of gallantry. Landmark Publishing. ISBN 978-184306-472-5.
