= Ballycotton =

Coastal village in County Cork, Ireland

Ballycotton Baile Choitín
- Village
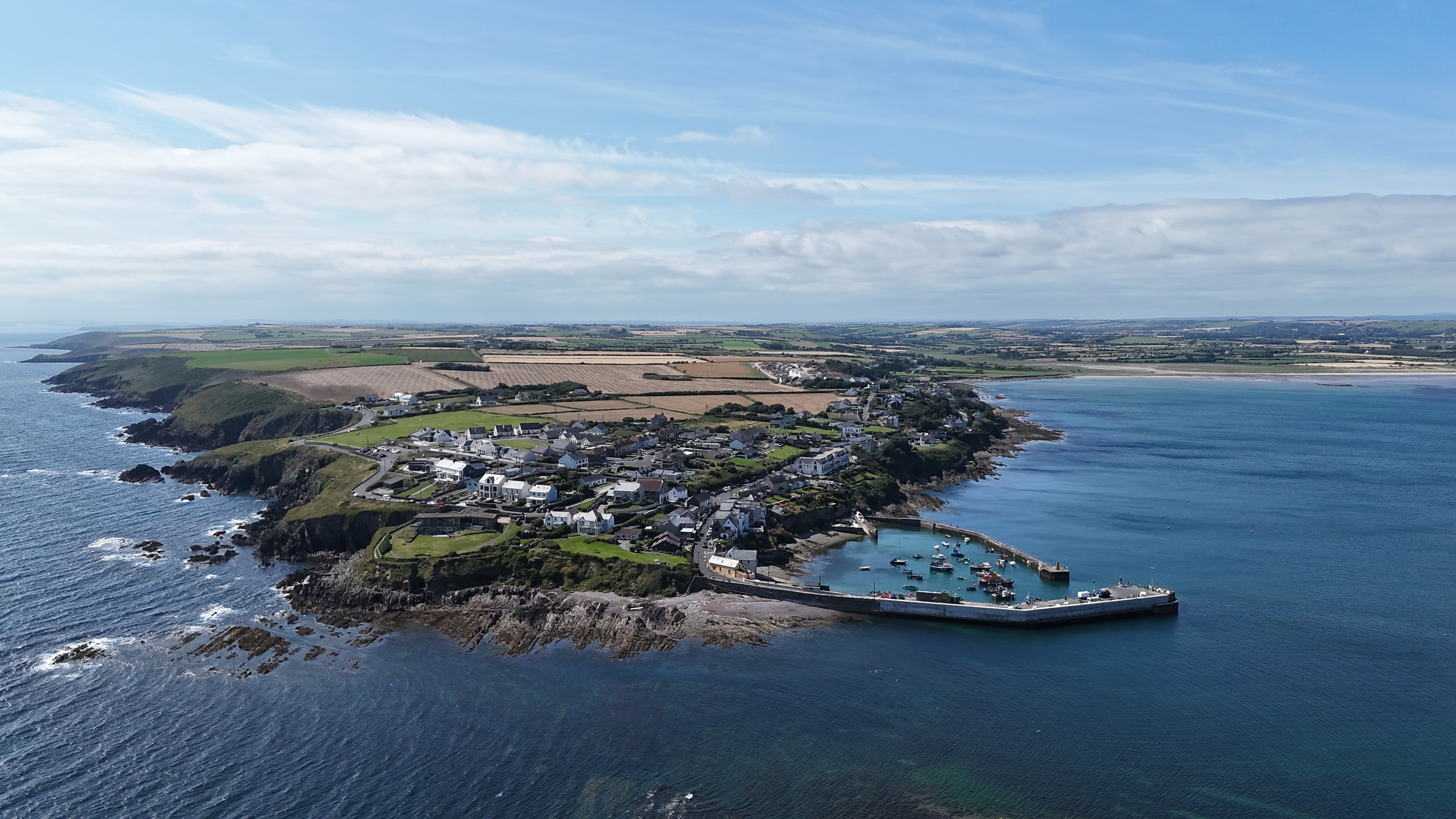
- Ballycotton in August 2025.

- Location in Ireland
- Coordinates: 51°49′37″N 08°00′11″W
- Country: Ireland
- Province: Munster
- County: County Cork

Population (2022)
  - Total: 544
- Time zone: UTC+0 (WET)
  - Summer (DST): UTC-1 (IST (WEST))
- Irish Grid Reference: W992640

Ballycotton (Irish: Baile Choitín) is a coastal village in County Cork, Ireland, situated about 25 miles (40 km) east of Cork city. It is a fishing village that sits on a rocky ledge overlooking Ballycotton Bay and has a sandy beach that stretches for about 25 kilometres (16 mi) east to Knockadoon Head. The current village is actually a re-settlement of an older village which is now entirely underwater. Ballycotton experiences severe coastal erosion with metres of land crumbling into the sea every few years. It is a site of international research interest on coastal erosion.

== Lifeboat ==
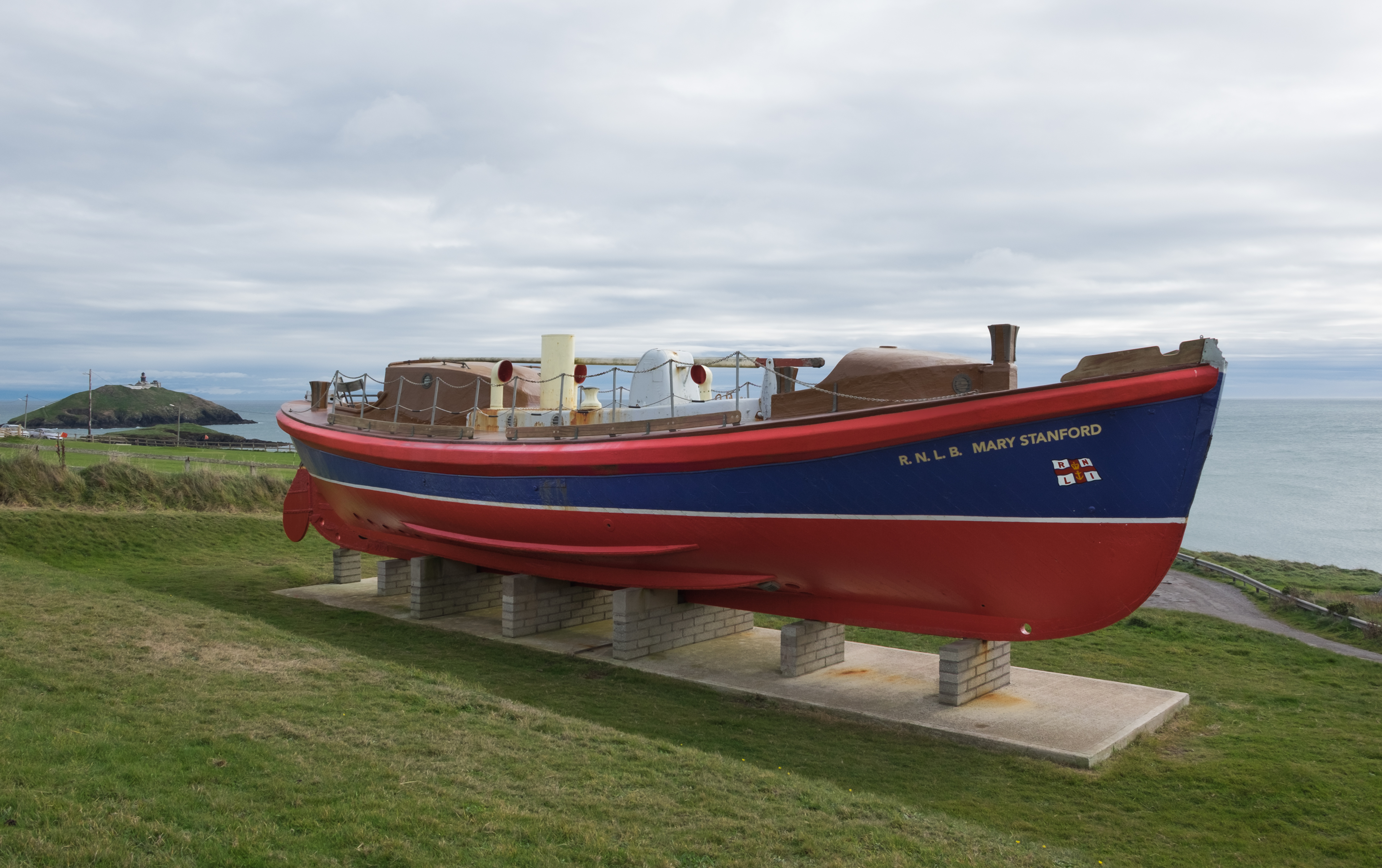
The preserved RNLB Mary Stanford (ON 733) in Ballycotton

The Royal National Lifeboat Institution (RNLI) lifeboat station was established in 1858, although medals had been awarded for rescues that took place in 1826 and 1829. The most famous rescue by the Ballycotton lifeboat took place in 1936. An RNLI gold medal was awarded to Coxswain Patrick Sliney, with silver medals to Second Coxswain John Lane Walsh and Motor Mechanic Thomas Sliney, and bronze medals to crew members Michael Coffey Walsh, John Shea Sliney, William Sliney and Thomas Walsh for the service on 11 February when the Daunt Rock lightship broke away from her moorings. The seas were so mountainous that spray was flying over the lantern of the lighthouse 196 feet (60 m) high. The Barnett-class lifeboat, RNLB Mary Stanford (ON 733) was away from the station for 79 hours and at sea for 49 hours; the crew had no food for 25 hours and they only had three hours sleep. The eight crew were rescued after the lifeboat went alongside the vessel more than a dozen times. This was one of the most exhausting and gallant services in the history of the RNLI.

== Lighthouse ==
Situated on the steep sloped Ballycotton Island approximately 2 km (1.2 mi) from the village, the Ballycotton lighthouse was commissioned in 1851 when the keeper and his family lived on the island and their children rowed to school, weather permitting. By 1899 the four keepers were housed in the town with keepers rotating duty at the lighthouse. In 1975 the light was converted to electricity and it was automated on 28 March 1992 when the lighthouse keepers were withdrawn.

== Amenities and tourism ==
Ballycotton has a number of public houses, restaurants and a hotel. There is a pitch and putt course, tennis and squash courts, and beaches nearby. Ballycotton pier and breakwater are used for fishing, with common catches including mackerel, black sole and plaice.

Ballycotton was used as a location for a film called Divine Rapture during the summer of 1995. Although the film starred Marlon Brando, Johnny Depp and Debra Winger, the production company went bankrupt after just 2 weeks and the movie was never completed.

First run in 1977, the annual Ballycotton Road Race attracted runners from around Ireland and abroad to its 10-mile circuit of country backroads. After 40 years, in October 2017, it was announced that the 2017 event was to be the last.

The broad area around Ballycotton is home to a number of artists and craftspeople, including woodworkers, painters, photographers, potters, writers and musicians. Robert Ballagh bought a holiday home in one nearby townland, which later became the home and workplace of Rachel Ballagh. Some local artists exhibit at the Stephen Pearce Gallery in Shanagarry. Ballycotton has a 13 km cliff walk which leads westward to Ballytrasna.

Wildlife in the area includes seals and dolphins, and whales are sometimes visible from the cliffs in December and January. The nearby beach at Ballynamona is on a wildlife sanctuary and herons, oystercatchers and sandhoppers. It is also possible to spot peregrine falcons near the rocky inlets at dawn and dusk.

== Ballycotton cross ==
In 1875 a local antiquarian, Philip T. Gardner, donated the Ballycotton cross (also known as the Ballycottin cross) to the British Museum. It is a 9th-century jewelled Celtic cross with a centre glass jewel with an inscription of the Bismillah in Kufic script which may be interpreted as As God wills, In the name of Allah or We have repented to God. It is held in the British Museum's brooch collection, and the provenance is: "said to have been found in or near Ballycottin Bog". As an early indicator of possible links between Ireland and early Islam, the cross has been cited in academic papers and histories of Islam's presence in Northern Europe in the late Dark Ages, and on speculative history websites and forums.

== See also ==
- List of lighthouses in Ireland
- List of towns and villages in the Republic of Ireland
- List of RNLI stations
