= Divine Rapture =

Unfinished film

Divine Rapture is an uncompleted 1995 American-Irish film with Marlon Brando, Johnny Depp, Debra Winger, and John Hurt.

== Background ==
Divine Rapture is the story of a set of miracles in a small 1950s Irish community. The town of Ballycotton in County Cork, where filming took place in the summer of 1995, expected to generate significant revenue from the project. Two weeks into production, however, filming stopped abruptly as the finances of the production company, CineFin, collapsed. Most cast and crew were unpaid, along with local suppliers of accommodation, catering and other services. After shooting for two weeks, the crew ended the shoot.. Some sources say they had only captured 29 minutes of footage.

== Documentary ==
In 2009, Hot Shot Films produced the documentary Ballybrando, recounting the story with interviews of cast, crew and production team including producer Barry Navidi, who had worked for six years to get Divine Rapture made. The documentary also includes scenes from the film. A headstone stands in Ballycotton's Main Street erected by local potter Stephen Pearce marking the event. It reads "Divine Rapture, born 10th July 1995, died 23rd July 1995, RIP". Ballybrando ends with the news that Navidi is reworking the script under a new title, Holy Mackerel, and that he hopes to film it in Ireland.
