= Rachel Ballagh =

Irish artist (born 1968)

- Born: 1968 (age 57–58)
- Education: National College of Art and Design
- Occupation: Artist

Rachel Ballagh is an Irish artist, working with photography, drawing and painting. From Dublin, she now lives and works in south-eastern County Cork. She has exhibited since the mid-1990s, and her work is held in a number of private collections, and was added to Ireland's National Collection in 2023.

== Early life and education ==
Rachel Ballagh was born to artist Robert Ballagh and his wife Betty (née Carabini, 1950–2011) in 1968; she has a younger brother. She grew up in Broadstone in north inner city Dublin, and attended a local Catholic school but was asked to leave as she refused to recite daily prayers. She later attended the National College of Art and Design a short distance away, graduating in 1992. She was a member of Militant Labour Youth. She featured in a number of her father's paintings.

== Career ==
Ballagh worked at Temple Bar Gallery and Studios, and also taught photography on the Youthreach programme. Both of these concluded in 2002, and her home was needed for renovation, so she moved to coastal County Cork, with her work changing focus as a result. She commented: "I found my work shifted from mainly lens based, to drawing... line, shape, structure and colour of the flora and fauna, ... drawings capture a sense of ordered chaos." In drawing, she works with graphite pencil, charcoal, paint chalk and watercolours, with added organic material, and also produces digital modifications of her physical works.

Rachel and her father have on occasion worked together. They had a joint show, Ballagh & Ballagh ... On Paper, at the Kenny Gallery in Galway in 2013.

=== Exhibitions, holdings and recognition ===
Ballagh had her first solo exhibition, Flock, at Temple Bar Gallery and Studio in Dublin in 1997. In advance news of the show, she participated in an exhibition called Signals at the Gallery of Photography, while seeking animal skeletons as she prepared Flock.

She has participated in multiple group shows, including one at the Stephen Pearce Emporium in Shanagarry, Dublin: In the Palm in 2021, and as one of two main artists at an exhibition in Castletownbere in 2019. Her work is held by a number of private collectors, and is within the Gordon Lambert (Trust) Art Collection, and in 2023 one of her compositions, Three Days after Day Fifteen (2022), was purchased for the Irish state's National Collection, to be held at the Crawford Art Gallery in Cork.

Ballagh's Back Garden (2021) was shortlisted for the Zurich Portrait Prize in 2022, following the shortlisting of her High Anxiety from more than a thousand entries for the same prize in 2020. She has been awarded bursaries from the Arts Council (of Ireland).

== Personal life ==
In 2002, Ballagh moved to the family's holiday home near Ballycotton, County Cork, and while she initially meant to stay briefly, as of 2022, she still lives and works there. Around 2012, she survived a severe bout of diverticulitis (a condition which contributed to her mother's death in 2011) and related complications, had another serious medical incident involving an induced coma in 2015, and later had to have radiotherapy; she has mentioned that mortality is a major theme in her work.
