= Le Batofar =

Theatre boat moored in Paris, France; originally an Irish lighthouse boat

Coordinates: 48°50′00″N 2°22′45″E

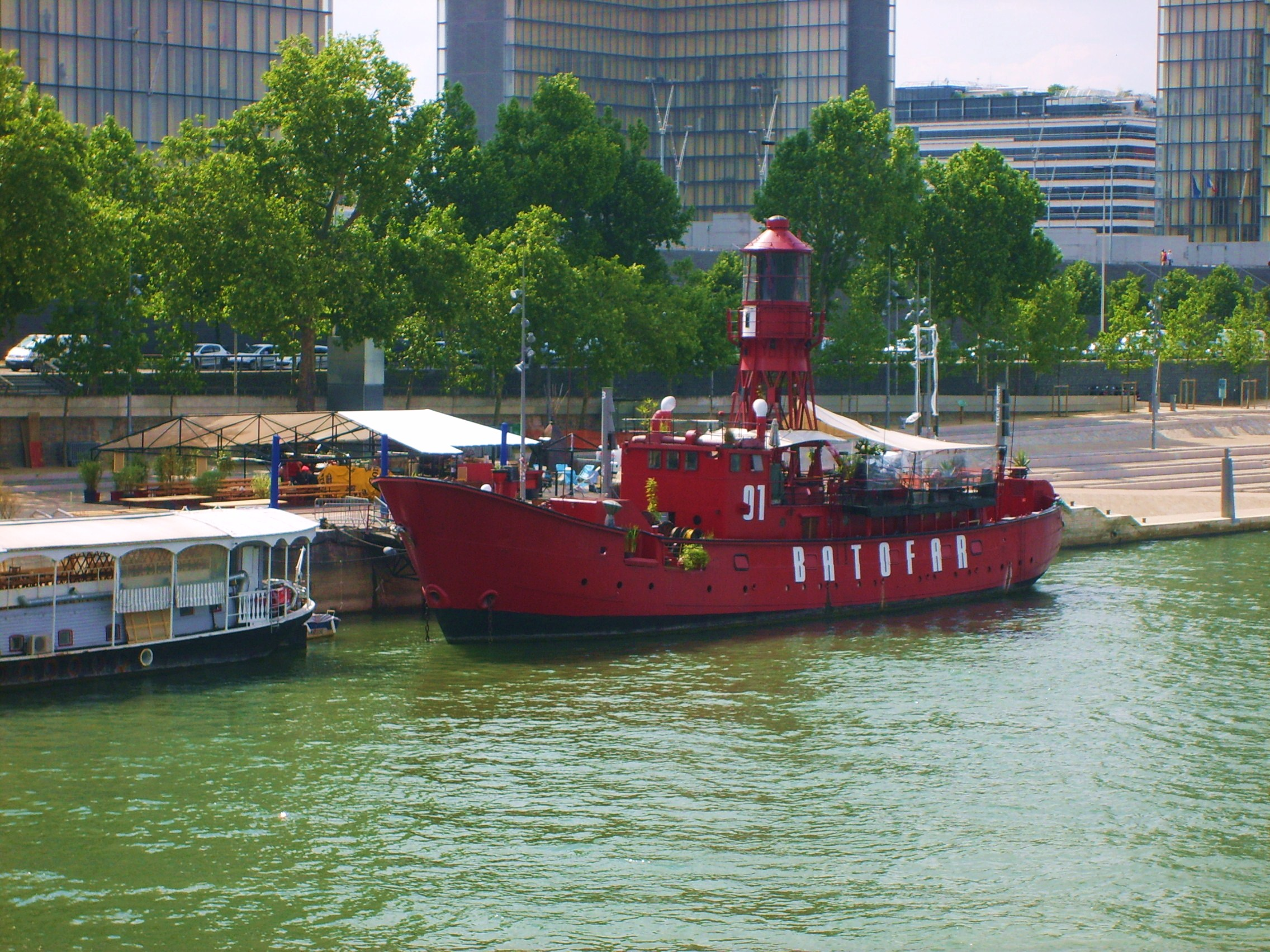
- Batofar

History

Ireland, sold to France
- Name: Osprey
- Owner: Irish Lights
- Ordered: 1953
- Builder: Philip and Son, Dartmouth
- Cost: £98,100
- Laid down: 1953
- Completed: 1955
- Renamed: Batofar (?-2018), Bateau Phare (2024-)
- Reclassified: Night Club

General characteristics
- Length: 134 feet
- Beam: 25 feet
- Depth: 15 feet

LV Osprey entered service as a Light Vessel for the Commissioners of Irish Lights in 1955. On 9 May 1975 she was sold to the New Ross Harbour Commissioners for use as a floating oil berth, pilot station and harbour store. In March 1998, she was sold again and moored on the Seine.

Le Batofar ignited the "night club on boat" trend in Paris. This lighthouse boat (in French bateau-phare) offers an original setting on the bank of the Seine in the 13th arrondissement. It is known for its progressive musical programming which champions cutting edge electro bands live, and its renowned DJ-driven afterhours dance parties. During the day, Batofar is also a community gathering that serves as a restaurant, café and a summertime "beach" hang-out (Paris-Beach).

The boat-club closed in 2018. It was renovated, however, and returned to service in 2024 as "Le Bateau Phare."
