= St Enda's GAA =

St Enda's GAA may refer to:

- Ballyboden St Enda's GAA, a sports club in Knocklyon, South Dublin, Ireland
- Omagh St Enda's GAA, a sports club
- St Enda's GAC, a sports club

== See also ==
- Naomh Éanna GAA (Gorey), a sports club
