= MV Naomh Éanna =

Decommissioned Irish ferry vessel

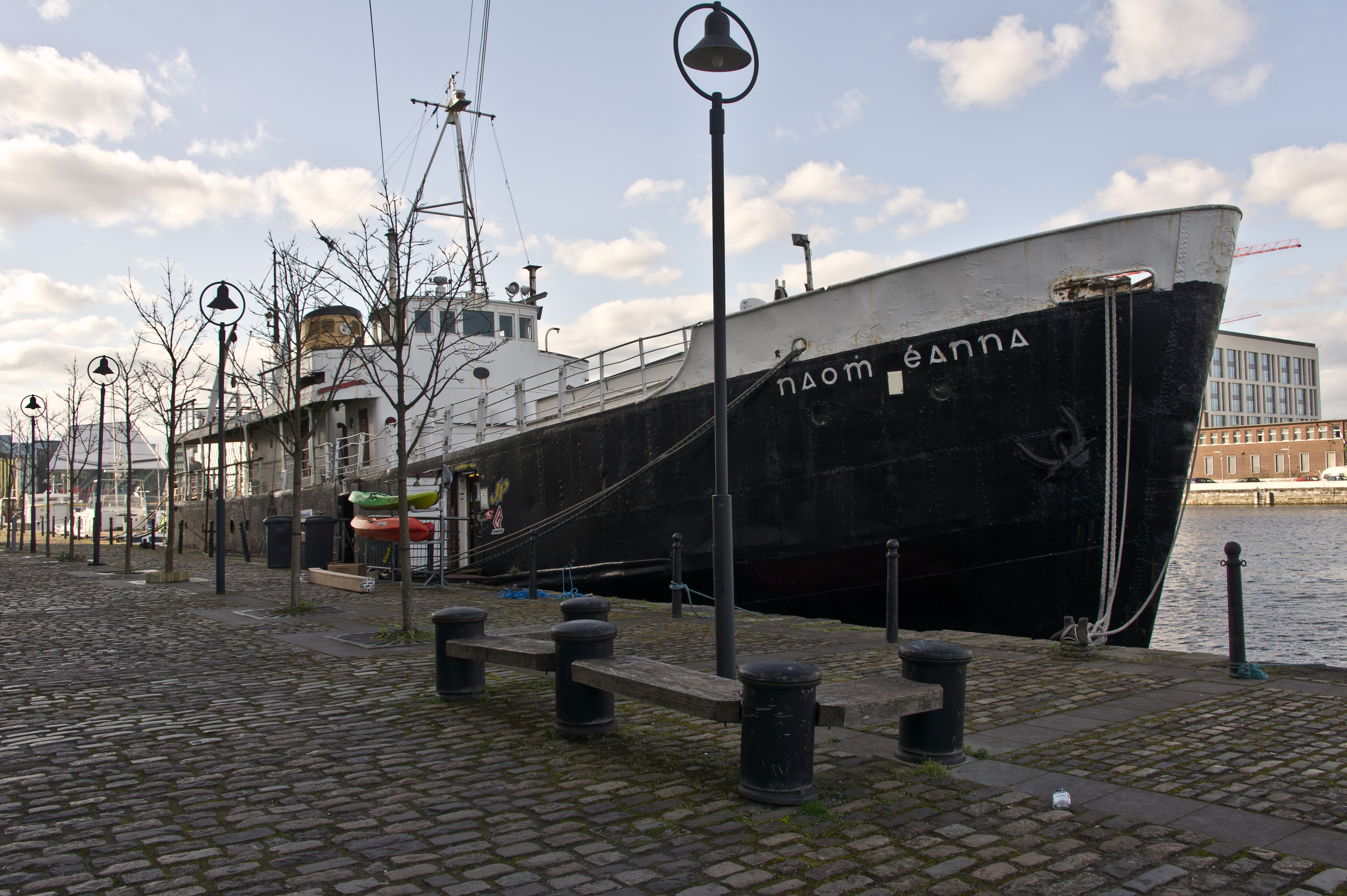
- MV Naomh Éanna in the Grand Canal Docks, 2011

History
- Name: MV Naomh Éanna
- Namesake: St Enda of Aran
- Owner: Irish Ship & Barge Fabrication Co
- Operator: Córas Iompair Éireann
- Route: Aran Islands, Ireland
- Builder: Liffey Dockyard, Dublin
- Yard number: 176
- Launched: 26 October 1957
- Completed: April 1958
- Fate: Scrapped

General characteristics
- Tonnage: 483 GRT

MV Naomh Éanna ("St Enda") was a ferry which historically operated as the primary connection on the Galway to Aran Islands route for Córas Iompair Éireann (CIÉ), remaining in service for 30 years. After decommissioning various plans were proposed for her preservation; However nothing came of this and she was dismantled in January 2024.

== Construction ==
The Naomh Éanna was constructed in 1958 at the Liffey Dockyard in Dublin and as of 2014 was one of the oldest Irish-built ships remaining in Ireland.

Along with similar vessels the MV Cill Airne and its exact replica, the MV Blarna (both commissioned 1961), she was one of the last riveted-hull ships built in Europe and one of the last ships to be built in the Liffey Dockyards.

== Service ==
Naomh Eanna entered service in the summer of 1958, replacing the SS Dun Aengus.

In August 1958, three months after entering service, she was among the ships to respond to the loss of KLM Flight 607-E.

After 30 years service she was decommissioned in 1986.

== Later use ==
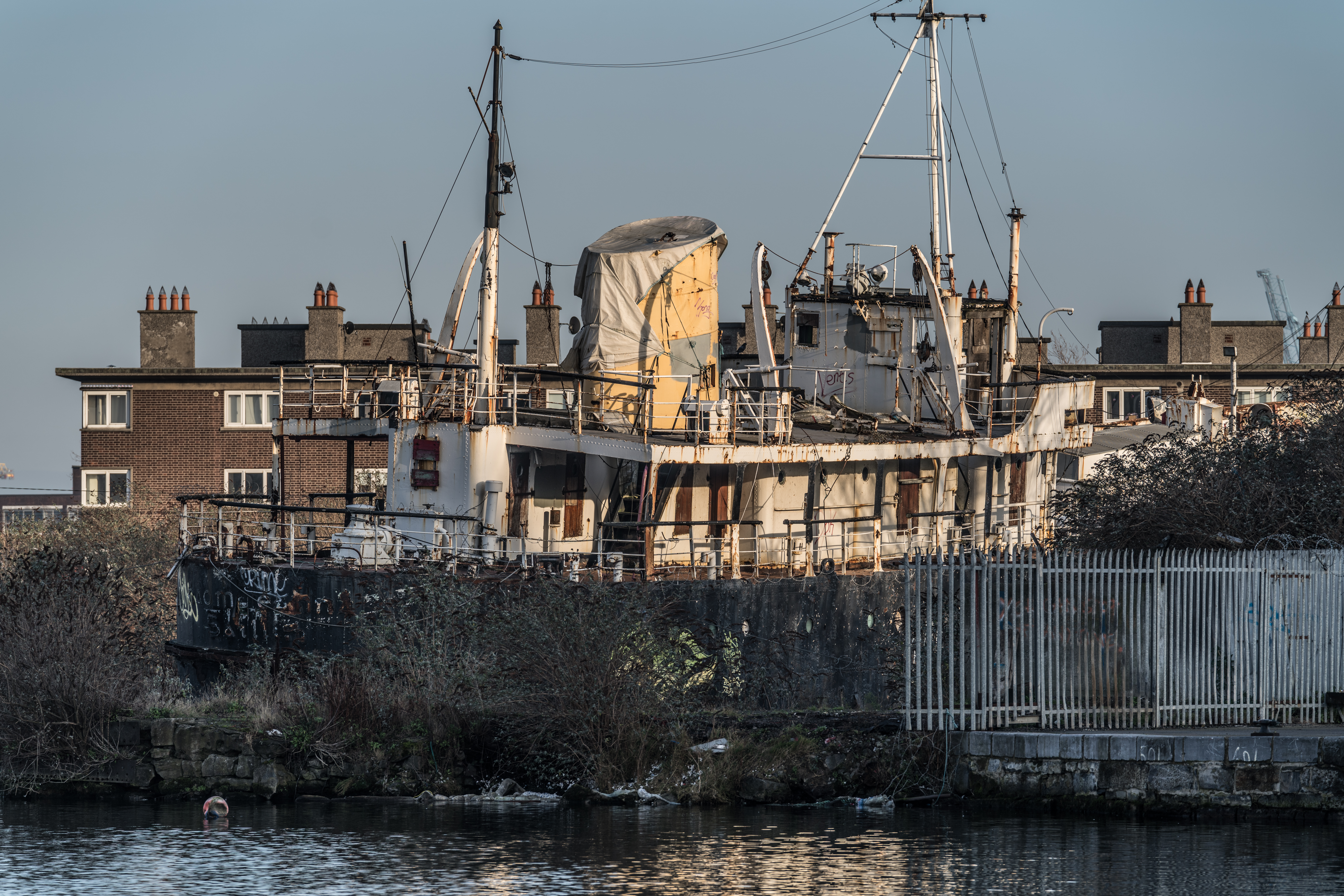
Naomh Éanna in graving dock, 2018

In 1989, she was acquired by the Irish Nautical Trust and moved to Dublin's Grand Canal Dock. In this location she housed a surf shop and sailmakers, and until 2014 was proposed to become the centrepiece of a "maritime quarter" in the Grand Canal Docks.

In February 2014 she was moved by Waterways Ireland to the Grand Canal Docks' graving dock for deconstruction, but the break-up was postponed due to public opposition and eventually dropped as a plan materialized to convert her to a tourist attraction in her original home Port of Galway. In 2014, she was the subject of a TV documentary directed by Donncha Mac Con Iomaire on TG4.

In 2018 she has been proposed to be converted into a five-star hotel on the River Liffey. The conversion plan never came to fruition and in summer 2021 the ship remained in a deteriorated state. On January 18, 2023, whilst at Dublin Docks, she capsized.

== Disposal ==
On January 12, 2024, having been righted in previous months, the ship was dismantled at Grand Canal Dock.

She was purged of asbestos and scrapped by Marine Contractors, Cunningham Civil & Marine who donated a number of artifacts for historic interest. The bow was donated to Galway Port Company.

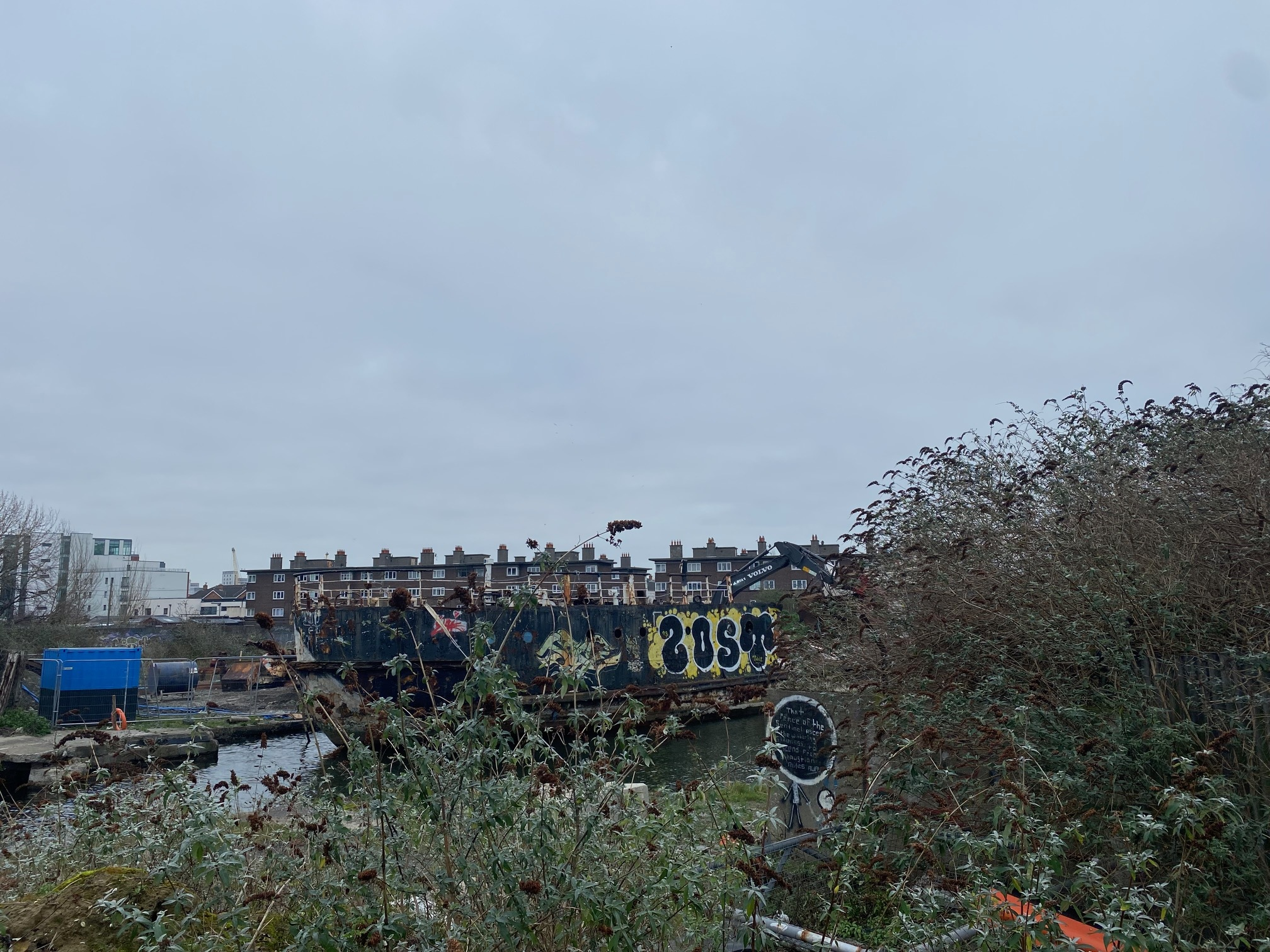
Nibbler dismantles the Naoimh Eanna
