= Puffin (lightvessel) =

The Puffin was a British-built lightvessel situated at Daunt Rock, five miles southwest of Roche's Point near the entrance to Cork Harbour, and was in the care of the Commissioners of Irish Lights.

The ship was built in 1887 by Schlesinger Davis & Co. in Wallsend, with yard number 144. Built of iron, it was 28.5 m long and 7.3 m wide, had a draught of 3.4 m and displaced 150 tons.

It sank on 8 October 1896 in a hurricane. The entire crew of eight was lost. In August 1897, the wreck of the Puffin was towed into Cobh harbour.
