= RNLB Mary Stanford (ON 661) =

Royal National Lifeboat Institution lifeboat; sank during a rescue mission in 1928

History
- Name: RNLB Mary Stanford
- Owner: RNLI
- Operator: Royal National Lifeboat Institution
- Builder: S. E. Saunders
- Launched: 1916
- Home port: Rye Harbour
- Official Number: ON 661

General characteristics
- Class & type: Liverpool Pulling & Sailing
- Type: Lifeboat
- Length: 39 ft (12 m)
- Beam: 10 ft 9 in (3.28 m)
- Installed power: 14 oars & sail

RNLB Mary Stanford (ON 661) was a Royal National Lifeboat Institution (RNLI) Liverpool-class pulling and sailing type lifeboat stationed in Rye Harbour. On 15 November 1928 the Mary Stanford capsized, drowning the entire crew of 17.

== Incident ==
The lifeboat was launched in a south-west gale with heavy rain squalls and heavy seas to the vessel Alice of Riga. News was received that the crew of the Alice had been rescued by another vessel and the recall signal was fired three times. Apparently, the lifeboat crew had not seen it. As the lifeboat finally came back into harbour she was seen to capsize and the whole of the crew perished.

The lifeboat house from which the Mary Stanford was launched

On Tuesday 20 November the funeral was held of fifteen of the crew, buried in a communal grave. Hundreds of mourners from all over the country attended. Members of the Latvian Government were among the dignitaries present, recognising that the men had lost their lives going to the assistance of a Latvian vessel. When Henry Cutting's body was found at Eastbourne 3 months later, it was bought back home and interred with his fellow crew members. John Head's body was never recovered.

The Mary Stanford remained at Rye Harbour until the inquiry was over. In January 1929 she was taken to the RNLI depot at Poplar in east London, where she was broken up.

The dependants of those who died were pensioned by the RNLI, with the local fund raising over £35,000.

== Memorials ==
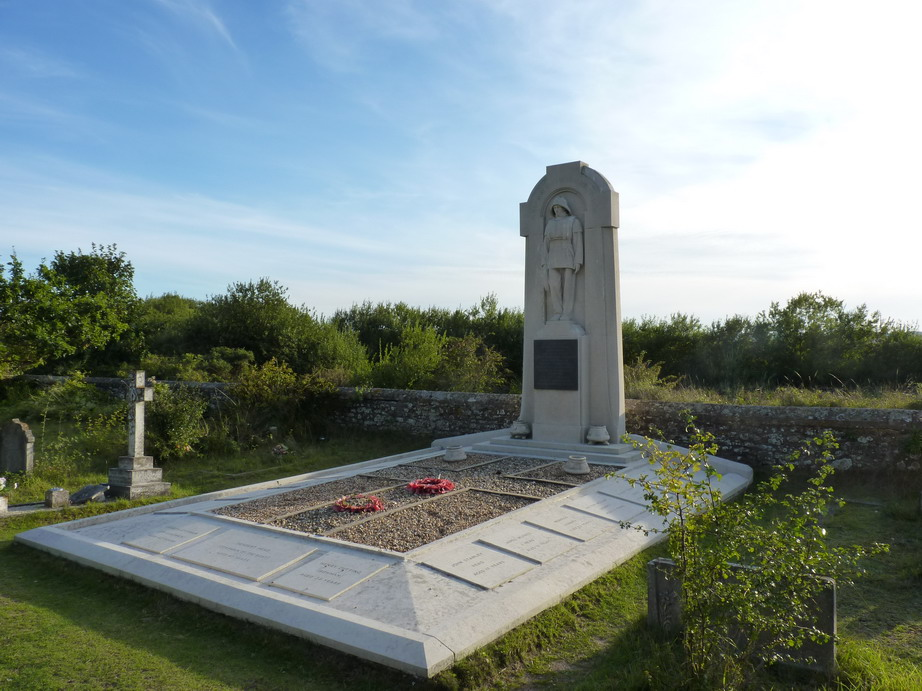
The Mary Stanford Lifeboat Memorial

A memorial tablet made of Manx stone was presented to Rye Harbour by the people of the Isle of Man.

A memorial stained glass window was placed in Winchelsea Church (50°55′27″N 0°42′33″E). It depicts a lifeboat putting out to a ship in distress while figures on the shore watch as it goes.

The seventeen men who lost their lives were Herbert Head (47), coxswain, and two sons James Alfred (19) and John Stanley (17); Joseph Stonham (43), 2nd Coxswain; Henry Cutting (39), Bowman and his two brothers Roberts Redvers (28) and Albert Ernest (26); Charles Frederick David (28), Robert Henry (23) and Lewis Alexander (21) Pope, three brothers; William Thomas Albert (27) and Leslie George (24) Clark, brothers; Arthur George (25) and Maurice James (23) Downey, cousins; Albert Ernest Smith (44), Walter Igglesden (37) and Charles Southerden (22).

Allen Maslen of Warwickshire folk rock band Meet on the Ledge wrote a song dedicated to the Mary Stanford, "The Mary Stanford of Rye".
