= Gloucester City Council elections =

Local government elections in Gloucestershire, England

Gloucester City Council is the local authority for the non-metropolitan district of Gloucester, in Gloucestershire, England.

== Election results ==
Composition of the council
Year	Conservative	Labour	Liberal Democrats (Note: Includes totals for the predecessors of the Liberal Democrats, the Liberal Party and SDP (both of which participated in the Alliance).)	Independents & Others	Council control after election
Local government reorganisation; council established (33 seats)
1973	21	12	0	0	Conservative
1976	27	5	1	0	Conservative
New ward boundaries (33 seats)
1979	25	7	1	0	Conservative
1980	21	9	3	0	Conservative
1982	19	8	6	0	Conservative
1983	17	11	5	0	Conservative
1984	16	11	6	0	No overall control
1986	15	12	5	1	No overall control
1987	17	10	5	1	Conservative
1988	17	9	6	1	Conservative
1990	11	14	7	1	No overall control
New ward boundaries (35 seats)
1991	10	17	7	1	No overall control
1992	13	16	5	1	No overall control
1994	11	17	7	0	No overall control
1995	7	20	8	0	Labour
1996	2	25	8	0	Labour
New ward boundaries (39 seats)
1998	6	25	8	0	Labour
1999	8	23	8	0	Labour
2000	11	19	8	1	Labour
New ward boundaries (36 seats)
2002	11	19	7	2	No overall control
2003	14	11	11	0	No overall control
2004	16	8	12	0	No overall control
2006	16	8	12	0	No overall control
2007	15	9	12	0	No overall control
2008	18	8	10	0	No overall control
2010	17	8	11	0	No overall control
2011	19	7	10	0	Conservative
2012	18	9	9	0	No overall control
2014	18	9	9	0	No overall control
2015	20	9	7	0	Conservative
New ward boundaries (39 seats) (Note: Changed from one-third to whole council elections.)
2016	22	10	7	0	Conservative
2021	26	3	10	0	Conservative
2024	11	7	17	4	No overall control

== Results maps ==
2002 results map

2003 results map

2004 results map

2006 results map

2007 results map

2008 results map

2010 results map

2011 results map

2012 results map

2014 results map

2015 results map

2016 results map

2021 results map

2024 results map

== By-election results ==
=== 2016-2021 ===
Longlevens by-election 3 November 2016
Party	Candidate	Votes	%	±%
Conservative	Clive Walford	1,066	46.2	+3.7
Liberal Democrats	Linda Castle	852	36.9	+23.7
Labour	Terry Haines	223	9.7	−8.2
UKIP	Daniel Woolf	167	7.2	−6.6
Majority		214	9.3	
Turnout		2,311	31	
Conservative hold		Swing		

=== 2021-2024 ===
Longlevens by-election 4 November 2021
Party	Candidate	Votes	%	±%
Liberal Democrats	Sarah Sawyer	1,520	60.3	
Conservative	Julie Evans	781	31.0	
Labour	Alfie Harrison	135	5.4	
Green	Claire Carter	86	3.4	
Majority		739	29.3	
Turnout		2,522		
Liberal Democrats gain from Conservative		Swing		

Tuffley by-election 13 October 2022
Party	Candidate	Votes	%	±%
Conservative	Lorraine Campbell	502	34.9	
Liberal Democrats	Caroline Courtney	487	33.8	
Labour	Tracy Millard	451	31.3	
Majority		15	1.0	
Turnout		1,440		
Conservative hold		Swing		

Westgate by-election 30 March 2023
Party	Candidate	Votes	%	±%
Liberal Democrats	Rebecca Trimnell	658	43.2	
Conservative	Peter Sheehy	455	29.9	
Labour	Trevor Howard	351	23.0	
Reform	Gill White	37	2.4	
Monster Raving Loony	Benjamin Baker	22	1.4	
Majority		203	13.3	
Turnout		1,523		
Liberal Democrats gain from Conservative		Swing		
