= 2015 Gloucester City Council election =

UK local election

← 2014	7 May 2015	2016 →

11 seats of 36 on council 19 seats needed for a majority
	First party	Second party	Third party
Leader	Paul James	Kate Haigh	Jeremy Hilton
Party	Conservative	Labour	Liberal Democrats
Seats before	18	8	10
Seats after	20	8	8
Seat change	▲2	Steady	▼2
- Results of the 2015 Gloucester City Council election

The 2015 Gloucester City Council election took place on 7 May 2015 to elect members of Gloucester City Council in England. Eleven of the 36 seats on the council were up for election, being a nominal third of the council. This was the last year of Gloucester electing its council by thirds, with elections from 2016 onwards being whole council elections every four years instead. The 2015 election was held on the same day as other local elections. The Conservatives gained two seats, giving them control of the council, which had previously been under no overall control. Paul James, the Conservative leader, continued to serve as leader of the council, but with his party having a majority.

== Results ==
The overall results were as follows:

Gloucester City Council election, 2015
Party	Seats	Gains	Losses	Net gain/loss	Seats %	Votes %	Votes	+/−
Conservative	8	2		+2	73%	42%	19,843	+4.4
Labour	2				18%	26%	12,083	-0.1
Liberal Democrats	1		2	-2	9%	15%	6,819	-4.0
UKIP	0					13%	6,107	-1.5
Green	0					4%	2,035	+1.3
TUSC	0					0%	140	-0.1

== Ward results ==
The results in each ward were as follows (candidates with an asterisk* were the previous incumbent standing for re-election):

Abbey ward
Party	Candidate	Votes	%	±%
Conservative	Laura Suzanne Pearsall	2,745	62%	
Labour	Bernard James Mundy	1154	26%	
Liberal Democrats	Howard Hyman	276	6%	
Green	Dominic Marsh	225	5%	
Turnout		4400	59%	
Conservative hold		Swing		

Barnwood ward
Party	Candidate	Votes	%	±%
Conservative	Tarren Anne Randle*	1,960	40%	
Liberal Democrats	Joanne Marie Brown	1089	22%	
Labour	Tom Coole	989	20%	
UKIP	Bob Mace	693	14%	
Green	Brendan Baker	190	4%	
Turnout		4921	63%	
Conservative hold		Swing		

Barton and Tredworth ward
Party	Candidate	Votes	%	±%
Conservative	Sajid Patel*	1,653	42%	
Labour	Ismail Ali	1342	34%	
UKIP	Phillip Nash	497	13%	
Green	Eva Langrock-Bircher	231	6%	
Liberal Democrats	Paul Harries	148	4%	
TUSC	John Henry Ewers	71	2%	
Turnout		3942	52%	
Conservative hold		Swing		

Hucclecote ward
Party	Candidate	Votes	%	±%
Conservative	Chris Etheridge	1,867	36%	
Liberal Democrats	Declan Wilson*	1766	34%	
Labour	Roger John Martin	747	14%	
UKIP	Stephen Pottage	628	12%	
Green	Simon Michael Robinson	166	3%	
Turnout		5174	73%	
Conservative gain from Liberal Democrats		Swing		

Kingsholm and Wotton ward
Party	Candidate	Votes	%	±%
Liberal Democrats	Sebastian Richard Seymour Field*	1,082	35%	
Conservative	Matthew Mark Stevens	777	25%	
Labour	Jonathan Richard Hoad	758	24%	
UKIP	Mike Smith	283	9%	
Green	Jonathan Cecil Ingleby	225	7%	
Turnout		3125	57%	
Liberal Democrats hold		Swing		

Longlevens ward
Party	Candidate	Votes	%	±%
Conservative	Kathy Williams*	2,870	53%	
Labour	Terry Haines	955	18%	
UKIP	Susannah Collier	815	15%	
Liberal Democrats	Diana Docksey	548	10%	
Green	Christopher David Britton	262	5%	
Turnout		5450	72%	
Conservative hold		Swing		

Matson and Robinswood ward
Party	Candidate	Votes	%	±%
Labour	Kate Haigh*	1,527	38%	
Conservative	Andrew Gilbert Miller	1252	31%	
UKIP	Gary Frederick Cleaver	874	22%	
Green	Roslyn Margaret Durrant	207	5%	
Liberal Democrats	Paul Harris	163	4%	
TUSC	Sue Powell	40	1%	
Turnout		4063	53%	
Labour hold		Swing		

Moreland ward
Party	Candidate	Votes	%	±%
Labour	Neil Hampson	1,577	37%	
Conservative	Lyn Ackroyd	1480	34%	
UKIP	Tony Hubble	700	16%	
Green	Matthew Sidford	338	8%	
Liberal Democrats	Fiona Margaret Bromby	192	4%	
TUSC	Caty Bailey	29	1%	
Turnout		4316	58%	
Labour hold		Swing		

Quedgeley Fieldcourt ward
Party	Candidate	Votes	%	±%
Conservative	Deb Llewellyn*	2,408	47%	
Labour	Dave Talbot	1473	29%	
UKIP	Alex McKee	784	15%	
Liberal Democrats	Kira Barnes-Moffatt	429	8%	
Turnout		5094	60%	
Conservative hold		Swing		

Quedgeley Severn Vale ward
Party	Candidate	Votes	%	±%
Conservative	Hannah Norman	1,460	42%	
Labour	Sian Lonia Krotiuk	786	22%	
Liberal Democrats	Anna Mozol*	778	22%	
UKIP	Dave Rowe	481	14%	
Turnout		3505	64%	
Conservative gain from Liberal Democrats		Swing		

Westgate ward
Party	Candidate	Votes	%	±%
Conservative	Paul Geoffrey Toleman*	1,371	45%	
Labour	Emma Jane Clifford	775	26%	
UKIP	Scott William Adair	352	12%	
Liberal Democrats	Isabel Mellonie Brazil	348	11%	
Green	Craig Higley	191	6%	
Turnout		3037	54%	
Conservative hold		Swing		
