= 2012 Gloucester City Council election =

UK local election

← 2011	3 May 2012	2014 →

10 seats of 36 on council 19 seats needed for a majority
	First party	Second party	Third party
Leader	Paul James	Kate Haigh	Jeremy Hilton
Party	Conservative	Labour	Liberal Democrats
Seats before	19	7	10
Seats after	18	8	10
Seat change	▼1	▲1	Steady
- Results of the 2012 Gloucester City Council election

The 2012 Gloucester City Council local elections took place on 3 May 2012 to elect members of Gloucester City Council in Gloucester, England. This was on the same day as other United Kingdom local elections were taking place across the country. The Conservatives lost one seat to Labour, leaving the Conservatives with exactly half the seats on the council, putting it under no overall control. The Conservatives continued to run the council, with their leader Paul James remaining leader of the council after the election.

== Results ==
The overall results were as follows:

Gloucester City Council election, 2012
Party	Seats	Gains	Losses	Net gain/loss	Seats %	Votes %	Votes	+/−
Conservative	4		1	-1	40%	37%	7,852	
Labour	4	1		+1	40%	33%	7,064	
Liberal Democrats	2				20%	23%	4,956	
UKIP	0					4%	874	
Green	0					2%	338	
TUSC	0					1%	170	

Turnout for the election was 32%, down 7% from the previous year.

== Results by ward ==
The results, by ward (candidates with an asterisk* were the previous incumbent standing for re-election):

Abbey ward
Party	Candidate	Votes	%	±%
Conservative	Gordon Taylor*	1,131	49%	
Labour	Jean Grigg	670	29%	
UKIP	Danny Sparkes	291	13%	
Liberal Democrats	Mike Anderton	141	6%	
Green	Charley Bircher	92	4%	
Turnout		2,325	31%	
Conservative hold		Swing		

Barnwood ward
Party	Candidate	Votes	%	±%
Conservative	Lise Noakes*	1,050	42%	
Liberal Democrats	Peter Richard Barnes	955	38%	
Labour	Shaun James Shute	519	21%	
Turnout		2,524	32%	
Conservative hold		Swing		

Barton and Tredworth ward
Party	Candidate	Votes	%	±%
Labour	Usman Bhaimia*	1,323	59%	
Conservative	Nasreen Akhtar	616	28%	
TUSC	Catherine Abigail Bailey	170	8%	
Liberal Democrats	Paul Harris	121	5%	
Turnout		2,230	28%	
Liberal Democrats hold		Swing		

Elmbridge ward
Party	Candidate	Votes	%	±%
Liberal Democrats	Susan Witts*	791	52%	
Conservative	Joseph Laxton McAleer	417	27%	
Labour	David Hitchings	316	21%	
Turnout		1,524	33%	
Liberal Democrats hold		Swing		

Grange ward
Party	Candidate	Votes	%	±%
Labour	Christopher Harry Chatterton	729	44%	
Conservative	Steve Morgan*	702	42%	
UKIP	Steve Carl Roffey	166	10%	
Liberal Democrats	Stephen John Power	57	3%	
Turnout		1,654	36%	
Labour gain from Conservative		Swing		

Hucclecote ward
Party	Candidate	Votes	%	±%
Liberal Democrats	David Brown*	1,448	59%	
Conservative	Chris Etheridge	628	26%	
Labour	Daniel Edward King	362	15%	
Turnout		2,438	34%	
Liberal Democrats hold		Swing		

Longlevens ward
Party	Candidate	Votes	%	±%
Conservative	Jim Porter*	1,425	47%	
Liberal Democrats	Di Docksey	1,111	37%	
Labour	Terry Haines	372	12%	
Green	Eva Langrock-Bircher	127	4%	
Turnout		3,035	40%	
Conservative hold		Swing		

Matson and Robinswood ward
Party	Candidate	Votes	%	±%
Labour	Mary Smith*	1,219	59%	
Conservative	Rebecca Lianne Byczok	472	23%	
UKIP	Gary Frederick Cleaver	274	13%	
Liberal Democrats	Derek Golightly	108	5%	
Turnout		2,073	27%	
Labour hold		Swing		

Moreland ward
Party	Candidate	Votes	%	±%
Labour	Mark Hobbs*	931	49%	
Conservative	Lyn Ackroyd	655	34%	
UKIP	Richard John Edwards	143	7%	
Green	Matthew John Sidford	119	6%	
Liberal Democrats	Timothy Robin Beck	59	3%	
Turnout		1,907	26%	
Labour hold		Swing		

Tuffley ward
Party	Candidate	Votes	%	±%
Conservative	Gerald Dee*	756	49%	
Labour	Maria Louise Griffin	623	40%	
Liberal Democrats	Matthew Eade	165	11%	
Turnout		1,544	33%	
Conservative hold		Swing		
