= 2021 Gloucester City Council election =

UK local election

← 2016	6 May 2021	2024 →

All 39 seats to Gloucester City Council 20 seats needed for a majority

	First party	Second party	Third party
Party	Conservative	Liberal Democrats	Labour
Last election	22 seats, 45.0%	7 seats, 16.5%	10 seats, 27.1%
Seats won	26	10	3
Seat change	▲4	▲3	▼7
Popular vote	31,278	18,505	11,839
Percentage	47.1%	27.9%	17.8%
Swing	▲2.1%	▲11.4%	▼9.3%
- Map showing the results of the 2021 Gloucester City Council election
Council control before election
Conservative
Council control after election
Conservative

The 2021 Gloucester City Council election took place on 6 May 2021 to elect members of Gloucester City Council in England. This was on the same day as other local elections. There were held elections for all 39 of the City Council’s seats, Quedgeley Town Council and for the Police and Crime Commissioner for Gloucestershire, all of which were postponed from May 2020 due to the COVID-19 pandemic.

== Summary ==
=== Election result ===
2021 Gloucester City Council election
Party	Candidates	Seats	Gains	Losses	Net gain/loss	Seats %	Votes %	Votes	+/−
Conservative	39	26	6	2	▲4	66.7	47.1	31,278	+2.1
Liberal Democrats	29	10	3	0	▲3	25.6	27.9	18,505	+11.4
Labour	22	3	0	7	▼7	7.7	17.8	11,839	–9.3
Independent	19	0	0	0	Steady	0.0	4.4	2,910	+3.9
Green	8	0	0	0	Steady	0.0	2.3	1,515	–2.8
Libertarian	1	0	0	0	Steady	0.0	0.3	204	N/A
TUSC	2	0	0	0	Steady	0.0	0.2	157	–0.4
SDP	1	0	0	0	Steady	0.0	<0.1	32	N/A

== Ward results ==
=== Abbeydale ===
Abbeydale
Party	Candidate	Votes	%	±%
Conservative	Andrew Gravells*	1,358	66.5	+8.0
Conservative	Collette Finnegan*	997	48.8	+3.5
Liberal Democrats	Abigail Wilson	501	24.5	+16.8
Liberal Democrats	James Cargill	403	19.7	N/A
Turnout		2,043	41.3	
Conservative hold		Swing		
Conservative hold		Swing		

=== Abbeymead ===
Abbeymead
Party	Candidate	Votes	%	±%
Conservative	Laura Brooker*	958	55.1	−2.0
Conservative	Gordon Taylor*	705	40.6	−6.4
Liberal Democrats	Isabel Brazil**	478	27.5	+2.6
Liberal Democrats	Alwin Wiederhold	475	27.3	+5.1
Labour	Christopher Rawlins	278	16.0	−0.5
SDP	Sadia Hameed	32	1.8	N/A
Turnout		1,738	38.9	
Conservative hold		Swing		
Conservative hold		Swing		

Isabel Brazil was a sitting councillor in Kingsholm & Wotton ward.

=== Barnwood ===
Barnwood
Party	Candidate	Votes	%	±%
Liberal Democrats	Joanne Brown*	928	42.0	+7.7
Liberal Democrats	Ashley Bowkett*	821	37.2	+7.5
Conservative	Fred Ramsey	782	35.4	−8.4
Conservative	Louise Walker	654	29.6	−4.5
Labour	Trevor Howard	255	11.6	+0.4
Green	Frances Griffiths	174	7.9	+2.0
Independent	Peter Barnes	144	6.5	N/A
Independent	Jim Woods	120	5.4	N/A
Turnout		2,207	44.3	
Liberal Democrats gain from Conservative		Swing		
Liberal Democrats hold		Swing		

=== Barton and Tredworth ===
Barton and Tredworth
Party	Candidate	Votes	%	±%
Conservative	Sajid Patel*	1,607	57.5	+10.7
Conservative	Shamsuz Zaman	1,212	43.4	+17.0
Labour	Usman Bhaimia*	1,108	39.7	−12.1
Labour	Ahmed Hansdot*	1,014	36.3	−10.9
Conservative	Jirka Pavelka	927	33.2	+8.8
Labour	Val Simms	814	29.1	−4.3
Green	Kate Ingleby	292	10.5	+3.0
Liberal Democrats	Sandra Adams	166	5.9	+0.2
TUSC	James Collett	85	3.0	−1.9
TUSC	Tony Hodges	72	2.6	−0.6
Turnout		2,794	39.4	
Conservative hold		Swing		
Conservative gain from Labour		Swing		
Labour hold		Swing		

=== Coney Hill ===
Coney Hill
Party	Candidate	Votes	%	±%
Conservative	James Durdey	269	38.3	+19.7
Labour	Sam Maynard	207	29.4	−7.8
Liberal Democrats	Luke Shervey	152	21.6	−8.8
Independent	Robert McCormick	50	7.1	N/A
Green	Adam Shearing	27	3.8	N/A
Turnout		703		
Conservative gain from Labour		Swing		

=== Elmbridge ===
Elmbridge
Party	Candidate	Votes	%	±%
Liberal Democrats	Anne Radley	815	42.1	−5.9
Liberal Democrats	Howard Hyman*	777	40.1	+1.7
Conservative	David Bucknell	598	30.9	+3.9
Conservative	Simon Locke	535	27.6	+2.7
Labour	Karen James	342	17.7	−0.3
Green	Jonathan Ingleby	217	11.2	+3.8
Turnout		1,936	40.7	
Liberal Democrats hold		Swing		
Liberal Democrats hold		Swing		

=== Grange ===
Grange
Party	Candidate	Votes	%	±%
Conservative	Steve Morgan*	854	48.4	+5.7
Conservative	Sylv Evans	742	42.1	−9.2
Independent	Nigel Hanman*	556	31.5	−19.8
Labour	Cilla Woodman	368	20.9	−15.0
Independent	Debbie Hill	221	12.5	N/A
Liberal Democrats	Karen Minchin	110	6.2	N/A
Turnout		1,764	34.8	
Conservative hold		Swing		
Conservative hold		Swing		

=== Hucclecote ===
Hucclecote
Party	Candidate	Votes	%	±%
Liberal Democrats	David Brown*	1,586	67.8	+11.0
Liberal Democrats	Declan Wilson*	1,164	49.8	+1.1
Conservative	Simon Nelmes	633	27.1	−6.3
Conservative	Jane Young	597	25.5	+2.0
Turnout		2,339	46.9	
Liberal Democrats hold		Swing		
Liberal Democrats hold		Swing		

=== Kingsholm and Wotton ===
Kingsholm and Wotton
Party	Candidate	Votes	%	±%
Liberal Democrats	Jeremy Hilton*	988	58.7	+8.7
Liberal Democrats	Angela Conder	806	47.9	+6.5
Labour	Ola Kareem	367	21.8	+0.4
Conservative	Peter Sheehy	361	21.4	+1.4
Conservative	James Strafford	262	15.6	−2.2
Independent	John McStay	131	7.8	N/A
Independent	Lynne Bisset	82	4.9	N/A
Turnout		1,683	36.0	
Liberal Democrats hold		Swing		
Liberal Democrats hold		Swing		

=== Kingsway ===
Kingsway
Party	Candidate	Votes	%	±%
Conservative	Richard Cook*	582	53.7	+1.5
Conservative	Jaro Kubaszczyk	439	40.5	−11.1
Labour	James Hoddy	359	33.1	−4.7
Liberal Democrats	Paul Caiden	209	19.3	N/A
Turnout		1,083	26.7	
Conservative hold		Swing		
Conservative hold		Swing		

=== Longlevens ===
Longlevens
Party	Candidate	Votes	%	±%
Conservative	Kathy Williams*	1,645	49.7	−7.6
Liberal Democrats	Linda Castle	1,523	46.0	+28.2
Conservative	Clive Walford*	1,312	39.6	−17.0
Liberal Democrats	Sarah Sawyer	1,250	37.8	N/A
Liberal Democrats	Jade Emraz	1,147	34.7	N/A
Conservative	Julie Evans	1,129	34.1	−14.6
Libertarian	Matthew Young	204	6.2	N/A
Turnout		3,310	44.7	
Conservative hold		Swing		
Liberal Democrats gain from Conservative		Swing		
Conservative hold		Swing		

=== Matson and Robinswood ===
Matson and Robinswood
Party	Candidate	Votes	%	±%
Conservative	Alastair Chambers	952	47.9	+20.1
Conservative	Raymond Padilla	777	39.1	+18.2
Conservative	Brendon O'Donnell	722	36.4	+16.3
Labour	Jen Cole	662	33.3	−13.5
Labour	Sandy Brammer	608	30.6	−12.8
Labour	Garry Mills	555	27.9	−12.5
Green	Anthony Bergonzi	228	11.5	−4.0
Independent	Gary Cleaver	212	10.7	−18.8
Independent	Simon Collins	131	6.6	N/A
Liberal Democrats	David Gayler	120	6.0	N/A
Independent	Stuart Love	78	3.9	N/A
Turnout		1,986	30.8	
Conservative gain from Labour		Swing		
Conservative gain from Labour		Swing		
Conservative gain from Labour		Swing		

=== Moreland ===
Moreland
Party	Candidate	Votes	%	±%
Conservative	Lyn Ackroyd	947	42.8	+2.9
Labour	Tree Chambers-Dubus	876	39.6	−10.5
Labour	Terry Pullen*	744	33.6	−6.8
Labour	Kevin Stephens*	739	33.4	−7.4
Conservative	Victoria Gladstone	710	32.1	+8.6
Conservative	Andrew Miller	697	31.5	+10.1
Green	Sharon Byfield	303	13.7	−3.7
Liberal Democrats	Caroline Courtney	266	12.0	N/A
Independent	Daniel Woolf	208	9.4	N/A
Independent	Neil Hampson*	134	6.1	−44.0
Turnout		2,214	32.9	
Conservative gain from Labour		Swing		
Labour hold		Swing		
Labour hold		Swing		

=== Podsmead ===
Podsmead
Party	Candidate	Votes	%	±%
Liberal Democrats	Sebastian Field*	365	39.8	N/A
Conservative	Byron Davis	335	36.5	−11.5
Labour	Lisa Jevins	162	17.6	−34.4
Green	Mike Byfield	35	3.8	N/A
Independent	Philip Nash	24	2.6	N/A
Turnout		918	40.3	
Liberal Democrats gain from Labour		Swing		

=== Quedgeley Fieldcourt ===
Quedgeley Fieldcourt
Party	Candidate	Votes	%	±%
Conservative	Stephanie Chambers	1,000	63.3	+15.3
Conservative	Hannah Norman**	839	53.1	+9.1
Liberal Democrats	Timothy Houlihan	562	35.5	+24.2
Turnout		1,581	30.5	
Conservative hold		Swing		
Conservative hold		Swing		

Hannah Norman was a sitting councillor in Quedgeley Severn Vale ward.

=== Quedgeley Severn Vale ===
Quedgeley Severn Vale
Party	Candidate	Votes	%	±%
Conservative	Justin Hudson	742	42.5	+7.6
Conservative	Andrew Lewis*	658	37.7	−6.3
Liberal Democrats	Liam Harries	630	36.1	+2.4
Liberal Democrats	David Bebbington	545	31.2	+12.7
No Description	Anna Mozol	350	20.0	−13.7
Turnout		1,746	37.7	
Conservative hold		Swing		
Conservative hold		Swing		

=== Tuffley ===
Tuffley
Party	Candidate	Votes	%	±%
Conservative	Colin Organ*	760	44.4	+6.2
Conservative	Paula Dee	678	39.6	+0.4
Labour	Tracy Millard	534	31.2	+2.6
Labour	John Jones	499	29.1	+7.6
Independent	John Rogers	190	11.1	N/A
Independent	Scott Clacher	135	7.9	N/A
Liberal Democrats	Joshua Taylor	86	5.0	N/A
Turnout		1,712	39.4	
Conservative hold		Swing		
Conservative hold		Swing		

=== Westgate ===
Westgate
Party	Candidate	Votes	%	±%
Conservative	Pam Tracey*	969	43.1	−15.6
Conservative	Paul Toleman*	814	36.2	−13.4
Conservative	Dawn Melvin*	793	35.3	−8.8
Liberal Democrats	Rebecca Trimnell	666	29.6	+16.0
Liberal Democrats	Farook Mota	501	22.3	+9.0
Labour	Emily Hoddy	477	21.2	−5.1
Liberal Democrats	George Barwood	465	20.7	+8.6
Labour	Jack Fayter	441	19.6	−4.4
Labour	Jake Pier	430	19.1	N/A
Green	Eva-Maria Langrock-Bircher	239	10.6	−7.3
Independent	Patricia Ullrich	59	2.6	N/A
Independent	Gayle Rutherford	55	2.4	N/A
Independent	Edit Kovacs	30	1.3	N/A
Turnout		2,247	35.8	
Conservative hold		Swing		
Conservative hold		Swing		
Conservative hold		Swing		

== By-Elections ==
=== Longlevens ===
A by-election was held in Longlevens ward on 4 November 2021 following the resignation of Clive Walford.

Longlevens: 4 November 2021
Party	Candidate	Votes	%	±%
Liberal Democrats	Sarah Sawyer	1,520	60.2	+15.1
Conservative	Julie Evans	781	30.9	−17.8
Labour	Alfie Harrison	135	5.3	N/A
Green	Claire Carter	86	3.4	N/A
Turnout		2,527	34.7	−10.0
Liberal Democrats gain from Conservative		Swing	16.4	

=== Tuffley ===
A by-election was held in Tuffley ward on 13 October 2022 following the death of Colin Organ.

Tuffley: 13 October 2022
Party	Candidate	Votes	%	±%
Conservative	Lorraine Campbell	502	34.9	−9.5
Liberal Democrats	Caroline Courtney	487	33.8	+28.8
Labour	Tracy Millard	451	31.3	+0.1
Turnout		1,445	32.4	−7.0
Conservative hold		Swing	▼19.2	

=== Westgate ===
A by-election was held in Westgate ward on 30 March 2023 following the resignation of Dawn Melvin.

Westgate: 30 March 2023
Party	Candidate	Votes	%	±%
Liberal Democrats	Rebecca Trimnell	658	43.2	+13.6
Conservative	Peter Sheehy	455	29.9	−5.4
Labour	Trevor Howard	351	23.0	+1.8
Reform UK	Gill White	37	2.4	N/A
Monster Raving Loony	Benjamin Baker	22	1.4	N/A
Turnout		1,523	23.4	−12.4
Liberal Democrats gain from Conservative		Swing	9.0	
