= 2003 Gloucester City Council election =

UK local election

← 2002	1 May 2003	2004 →

11 seats of 36 on the council 19 seats needed for a majority
	First party	Second party	Third party
Leader	Mark Hawthorne	Kevin Stephens	Bill Crowther
Party	Conservative	Labour	Liberal Democrats
Seats before	14	12	10
Seats after	14	11	11
Seat change	Steady	▼1	▲1
- Results of the 2003 Gloucester City Council election

The 2003 Gloucester City Council election took place on 1 May 2003 to elect members of Gloucester City Council in England. The council remained under no overall control. The leader of the council, Kevin Stephens of Labour, lost his seat. The leader of the Liberal Democrats group, Bill Crowther, became leader of the council after the election.

== Results ==
Gloucester City Council election, 2003
Party	Seats	Gains	Losses	Net gain/loss	Seats %	Votes %	Votes	+/−
Conservative	5	1	1	0		40.0	7620	
Liberal Democrats	4	1		1		35.9	6833	
Labour	4		1	-1		21.6	4110	
UKIP	0					1.1	201	
Green	0					1.0	195	
Socialist	0					0.5	98	

== Ward results ==
=== Abbey ===
Abbey 2003
Party	Candidate	Votes	%	±%
Conservative	Michael Rentell	1,302	65.6	
Liberal Democrats	David Brown	305	15.4	
Labour	Donald Duncan	303	15.3	
Green	Stuart Croft	76	3.8	
Turnout				
Conservative hold		Swing		

=== Barnwood ===
Barnwood 2003
Party	Candidate	Votes	%	±%
Liberal Democrats	Stephen Reeve	901	47.9	
Conservative	Kenneth Mitchell	585	31.1	
Labour	John Carr	394	21.0	
Turnout				
Liberal Democrats hold		Swing		

=== Barton and Tredworth ===
Barton and Tredworth 2003
Party	Candidate	Votes	%	±%
Labour	Harjit Gill	850	56.1	
Liberal Democrats	Thomas Croucher	304	20.1	
Conservative	Leonard Proctor	262	17.3	
Socialist	John Ewers	98	6.5	
Turnout				
Labour hold		Swing		

=== Hucclecote ===
Hucclecote 2003
Party	Candidate	Votes	%	±%
Liberal Democrats	Declan Wilson	1,583	62.0	
Conservative	Maurice Barrett	719	28.2	
Labour	Rosalind Onians	250	9.8	
Turnout				
Liberal Democrats hold		Swing		

=== Kingsholm and Wotton ===
Kingsholm and Wotton 2003
Party	Candidate	Votes	%	±%
Liberal Democrats	Michael Power	925	55.6	
Conservative	Robert Moreland	544	32.7	
Labour	Terence Haines	142	8.5	
UKIP	Richard Edwards	52	3.1	
Turnout				
Liberal Democrats hold		Swing		

=== Longlevens ===
Longlevens 2003
Party	Candidate	Votes	%	±%
Conservative	Mark Hawthorne	1,506	49.2	
Liberal Democrats	Lucy Nethsingha	1287	42.0	
Labour	David Cook	269	8.8	
Turnout				
Conservative hold		Swing		

=== Matson and Robinswood ===
Matson and Robinswood 2003
Party	Candidate	Votes	%	±%
Conservative	Stuart Wilson	730	42.5	
Labour	Kevin Stephens	696	40.5	
Liberal Democrats	Jonathon Trigg	205	11.9	
UKIP	Terence Lines	88	5.1	
Turnout				
Conservative gain from Labour		Swing		

=== Moreland ===
Moreland 2003
Party	Candidate	Votes	%	±%
Labour	Geraldene Gillespie	656	45.4	
Conservative	Terence King	509	35.2	
Liberal Democrats	David Gamble	160	11.1	
Green	Daryl Lines	119	8.2	
Turnout				
Labour hold		Swing		

=== Quedgeley Fieldcourt ===
Quedgeley Fieldcourt 2003
Party	Candidate	Votes	%	±%
Conservative	Susan Lewis	442	44.8	
Liberal Democrats	Julian Powell	281	28.5	
Labour	Redvers Thomas	203	20.6	
UKIP	Adrian Webb	61	6.2	
Turnout				
Conservative hold		Swing		

=== Quedgeley Severn Vale ===
Quedgeley Severn Vale 2003
Party	Candidate	Votes	%	±%
Conservative	Martyn White	510	52.4	
Liberal Democrats	Helen Powell	249	25.6	
Labour	Alan Trigg	215	22.1	
Turnout				
Conservative hold		Swing		

=== Westgate ===
Westgate 2003
Party	Candidate	Votes	%	±%
Liberal Democrats	Gordon Heath	633	49.6	
Conservative	Stephen Morgan	511	40.0	
Labour	Steven Richards	132	10.3	
Turnout				
Liberal Democrats gain from Conservative		Swing		
