= 2010 Gloucester City Council election =

UK local election

← 2008	6 May 2010	2011 →

15 seats of 36 on council 19 seats needed for a majority
	First party	Second party	Third party
Leader	Paul James
Party	Conservative	Labour	Liberal Democrats
Seats before	17	8	11
Seats after	17	8	11
Seat change	Steady	Steady	Steady
- Results of the 2010 Gloucester City Council election

The 2010 Gloucester City Council election took place on 6 May 2010 to elect members of Gloucester City Council in England. Although two wards changed parties, one went from Labour to Conservative and the other went from Conservative to Labour, so there was no net change in the overall number of seats held by each party. The council remained under no overall control. After the election, Paul James continued to serve as leader of the council, leading a Conservative minority administration.

== Results ==
Gloucester City Council election, 2010
Party	Seats	Gains	Losses	Net gain/loss	Seats %	Votes %	Votes	+/−
Conservative	8	1	1	0		36%		
Liberal Democrats	4					31%		
Labour	3	1	1	0		27%		
Conservative	0					2%		
UKIP	0					2%		
Green	0					1%		
English Democrat	0					<1%		

== Ward results ==
=== Abbey ===
Abbey 2010
Party	Candidate	Votes	%	±%
Conservative	Andrew Gravells	2,876	56	
Labour	Bernie Mundy	1151	22	
Liberal Democrats	John McFeely	924	18	
UKIP	Danny Sparkes	206	4%	
Turnout		5157		
Conservative hold		Swing		

=== Barnwood ===
Barnwood 2010
Party	Candidate	Votes	%	±%
Liberal Democrats	Philip Stuart McLellan	2,502	52	
Conservative	Tarren Anne Randle	1359	28	
Labour	Jean Grigg	955	20	
Turnout		4816		
Liberal Democrats hold		Swing		

=== Barton and Tredworth ===
Barton and Tredworth 2010
Party	Candidate	Votes	%	±%
Labour	Said Hansdot	1,677	43	
Conservative	Sajid Patel	1079	28	
Liberal Democrats	Verona Vidal	909	23	
Green	Robin Paul Saunders	228	6	
Turnout		3893		
Labour gain from Conservative		Swing		

=== Elmbridge ===
Elmbridge 2010
Party	Candidate	Votes	%	±%
Liberal Democrats	Chris Witts	1,523	48	
Conservative	Pat Bibby	878	27	
Labour	Terry Haines	632	20	
UKIP	Bob Mace	161	5	
Turnout		3194		
Liberal Democrats hold		Swing		

=== Grange ===
Grange 2010
Party	Candidate	Votes	%	±%
Conservative	Nigel Joseph Hanman	1,415	46	
Labour	Andy Jones	1103	36	
Liberal Democrats	Paul Harris	553	18	
Turnout		3071		
Conservative hold		Swing		

=== Hucclecote ===
Hucclecote 2010
Party	Candidate	Votes	%	±%
Liberal Democrats	Jim Beeley	2,797	55	
Conservative	Luke Nathan Hindhaugh	1,563	31	
Labour	Roger Mills	738	14	
Turnout		5098		
Liberal Democrats hold		Swing		

=== Kingsholm and Wotton ===
Kingsholm and Wotton 2010
Party	Candidate	Votes	%	±%
Liberal Democrats	Jeremy Eric Hilton	1,394	46	
Conservative	Matthew Mark Stevens	840	27	
Labour	David Hitchings	692	23	
Green	Jonathan Cecil Ingleby	132	4	
Turnout		3058		
Liberal Democrats hold		Swing		

=== Longlevens ===
Longlevens 2010
Party	Candidate	Votes	%	±%
Conservative	Paul Simon James	2,958	54	
Liberal Democrats	Jayna Elizabeth Tyler	1686	31	
Labour	Danny King	863	16	
Turnout		5507		
Conservative hold		Swing		

=== Matson and Robinswood ===
Matson and Robinswood 2010
Party	Candidate	Votes	%	±%
Labour	Jan Lugg	1,703	40	
Conservative	Andrew Gilbert Miller	1423	33	
Liberal Democrats	Mike Anderton	689	16	
UKIP	Richard John Edwards	262	6	
English Democrat	Alan Arthur Platt	127	3	
Green	Carol Jane Pediani	76	2	
Turnout				
Labour hold		Swing		

=== Moreland ===
Moreland 2010
Party	Candidate	Votes	%	±%
Labour	Nick Durrant	1,725	41	
Conservative	Lyn Ackroyd	1403	33	
Liberal Democrats	Guy Thomas Powell	625	15	
UKIP	Stan Parker	270	6	
Green	Jennifer Maureen Hume	168	4	
Turnout				
Labour hold		Swing		

=== Podsmead ===
Podsmead 2010
Party	Candidate	Votes	%	±%
Conservative	Jennie Rutheva Dallimore	526	39	
Labour	Kay Frances Mills	500	37	
Liberal Democrats	Thomas Partington	188	14	
UKIP	Tone Woodman	120	9	
Green	Matthew John Sidford	29	2	
Turnout		1363		
Conservative gain from Labour		Swing		

=== Quedgeley Fieldcourt ===
Quedgeley Fieldcourt 2010
Party	Candidate	Votes	%	±%
Conservative	Frederick Charles Wood	1,694	43	
Labour	Barry Peter Kirby	1211	30	
Liberal Democrats	David Robert Southgate	1068	27	
Turnout		3973		
Conservative hold		Swing		

=== Quedgeley Severn Vale ===
Quedgeley Severn Vale 2010
Party	Candidate	Votes	%	±%
Conservative	Andrew Steven Lewis	1,458	43%	
Liberal Democrats	Anna Mozol	1175	34%	
Labour	Molly Mahon-Creasey	690	20%	
Green	Charley Bircher	86	3%	
Turnout		3,409		
Conservative hold		Swing		

=== Tuffley ===
Tuffley 2010
Party	Candidate	Votes	%	±%
Conservative	Colin Adrian Organ	1,257	42	
Labour	Tony Lewis	1109	37	
Liberal Democrats	Andrew George Meads	597	20	
Turnout		2963		
Conservative hold		Swing		

=== Westgate ===
Westgate 2010
Party	Candidate	Votes	%	±%
Conservative	Pam Tracey	1,113	46	
Liberal Democrats	Kelsa Jayne Rowlands-Evans	724	30	
Labour	Kate Tildsley	460	19	
Green	Eva Langrock	98	4	
Turnout		2395		
Conservative hold		Swing		
