= 1983 Gloucester City Council election =

UK local election

The 1983 Gloucester City Council election took place on 5 May 1983 to elect members of Gloucester City Council in England.

== Results ==
Gloucester City Council election, 1983
Party	Seats	Gains	Losses	Net gain/loss	Seats %	Votes %	Votes	+/−
Conservative	17				51.5			
Labour	11				33.3			
Alliance	5				15.2			

== Ward results ==
=== Barnwood ===
Barnwood 1983
Party	Candidate	Votes	%	±%
Conservative	Hartshorne A.	1,818	49.2	
Labour	Ms. J. Morgan	1,329	36.0	
Alliance	C. Cole	545	14.8	
Turnout		3,692	45.9	
Conservative hold		Swing		

=== Barton ===
Barton 1983
Party	Candidate	Votes	%	±%
Labour	D. Cosstick	1,137	46.7	
Conservative	Ms. H. Lane	970	39.8	
Alliance	J. Holmes	328	13.5	
Turnout		2,435	42.7	
Labour gain from Conservative		Swing		

=== Eastgate ===
Eastgate 1983
Party	Candidate	Votes	%	±%
Labour	T. Ayland	1,243	41.8	
Conservative	C. Peak	1,047	35.2	
Alliance	Ms. M. Wells	682	22.9	
Turnout		2,972	48.4	
Labour hold		Swing		

=== Hucclecote ===
Hucclecote 1983
Party	Candidate	Votes	%	±%
Conservative	T.* Wathen	1,630	47.1	
Alliance	A. Cox	1,266	36.6	
Labour	Ms. K. Mills	562	16.3	
Turnout		3,458	55.5	
Conservative hold		Swing		

=== Kingsholm ===
Kingsholm 1983
Party	Candidate	Votes	%	±%
Conservative	E. Ede	1,271	36.4	
Alliance	Ms. J. Warlow	1,151	32.9	
Labour	Ms. J. Kirby	600	17.2	
Ind. Conservative	R.* Langston	472	13.5	
Turnout		3,494	59.0	
Conservative gain from Alliance		Swing		

=== Linden ===
Linden 1983
Party	Candidate	Votes	%	±%
Labour	K. Lee	1,053	38.0	
Conservative	Ms. B. Grimshaw	924	33.3	
Alliance	G. Martin	796	28.7	
Turnout		2,773	47.6	
Labour gain from Conservative		Swing		

=== Longlevens ===
Longlevens 1983
Party	Candidate	Votes	%	±%
Conservative	N.* Partridge	1,843	52.2	
Labour	T. Sherwood	868	24.6	
Alliance	M. Butler	822	23.3	
Turnout		3,533	57.2	
Conservative hold		Swing		

=== Matson ===
Matson 1983
Party	Candidate	Votes	%	±%
Labour	K. Stephens	1,263	53.0	
Conservative	Ms. J. Bracey	733	30.7	
Alliance	H. James	388	16.3	
Turnout		2,384	36.7	
Labour hold		Swing		

=== Podsmead ===
Podsmead 1983
Party	Candidate	Votes	%	±%
Alliance	D.* Halford	1,923	63.5	
Conservative	F. Stephens	557	18.4	
Labour	R. Thomas	546	18.0	
Turnout		3,026	51.4	
Alliance hold		Swing		

=== Tuffley ===
Tuffley 1983
Party	Candidate	Votes	%	±%
Conservative	T. Phillips	1,378	43.2	
Labour	R. Smith	1,314	41.2	
Alliance	S. O'Connor	497	15.6	
Turnout		3.189	53.4	
Conservative hold		Swing		

=== Westgate ===
Westgate 1983
Party	Candidate	Votes	%	±%
Conservative	Ms.* F. Wilton	1,074	44.2	
Alliance	R. Welshman	863	35.5	
Labour	F. Stevens	492	20.3	
Turnout		2,429	45.3	
Conservative hold		Swing		
