= 2008 Gloucester City Council election =

UK local election

← 2007	1 May 2008	2010 →

12 seats of 36 on the council 19 seats needed for a majority
	First party	Second party	Third party
Leader	Paul James
Party	Conservative	Labour	Liberal Democrats
Seats before	15	9	12
Seats after	17	8	11
Seat change	▲2	▼1	▼1
- Results of the 2008 Gloucester City Council election

The 2008 Gloucester City Council election took place on 1 May 2008 to elect members of Gloucester City Council in England. Twelve of the 36 seats on the council were up for election, ten of which were the usual nominal third of the council. The other two were by-elections, being one in Barnwood ward (following the resignation of Phil Taylor of the Liberal Democrats) and the other in Barton and Tredworth ward (following the resignation of Carol Francis of Labour). The council remained under no overall control. Paul James continued to serve as leader of the council after the election, leading a minority Conservative administration.

== Results summary ==
Gloucester City Council election, 2008
Party	Seats	Gains	Losses	Net gain/loss	Seats %	Votes %	Votes	+/−
Conservative	6	2		+2		44		
Liberal Democrats	4		1	-1		32		
Labour	2		1	-1		19		
Independent	2					2		
UKIP	0					2		
Green	0					1		

== Ward results ==
=== Abbey ===
Abbey 2008
Party	Candidate	Votes	%	±%
Conservative	Gordon Taylor	1,649	66	
Labour	Bernard James Mundy	411	16	
Liberal Democrats	John McFeely	305	12	
UKIP	Danny Sparkes	145	6	
Turnout		2510		
Conservative hold		Swing		

=== Barnwood ===
Barnwood 2008
Party	Candidate	Votes	%	±%
Conservative	Lise Noakes	1,311	47	
Liberal Democrats	John David McLellan	1,285	46	
Conservative	Eileen Margaret Barnes	1,158	41	
Liberal Democrats	Val O'Connor	1,034	37	
Labour	Jean Grigg	260	9	
Labour	John Garwood	223	8	
Turnout		2800		
Conservative hold		Swing		
Liberal Democrats hold		Swing		

=== Barton and Tredworth ===
Barton and Tredworth 2008
Party	Candidate	Votes	%	±%
Liberal Democrats	Usman Gani Bhaimia	937	40	
Conservative	Yakub Pandor	899	38	
Labour	Sonia Louise Friend	767	32	
Labour	Shaun James Shute	604	26	
Conservative	Tarren Anne Randle	495	21	
Liberal Democrats	Martin Bryan Ronald Horton	463	20	
Green	Jennifer Maureen Hume	164	7	
Turnout		2362		
Liberal Democrats hold		Swing		
Conservative gain from Labour		Swing		

=== Elmbridge ===
Elmbridge 2008
Party	Candidate	Votes	%	±%
Liberal Democrats	Susan Angela Jones	940	55	
Conservative	Vic Rice	590	34	
Labour	David Hitchings	184	11	
Turnout		1714		
Liberal Democrats hold		Swing		

=== Grange ===
Grange 2008
Party	Candidate	Votes	%	±%
Conservative	Steve Morgan	1,042	64	
Labour	Matthew William Gilson	357	22	
Liberal Democrats	Kevin Norman Daws	14	34	
Turnout		1636		
Conservative hold		Swing		

=== Hucclecote ===
Hucclecote 2008
Party	Candidate	Votes	%	±%
Liberal Democrats	David John Brown	1,636	57	
Conservative	Brian Stanley Edge	1015	36	
Labour	Roger Alfred James Mills	206	7	
Turnout		2857		
Liberal Democrats hold		Swing		

=== Longlevens ===
Longlevens 2008
Party	Candidate	Votes	%	±%
Conservative	Jim Porter	1,819	52	
Liberal Democrats	Di Phillips	1537	44	
Labour	Steve Richards	172	5	
Turnout		3528		
Conservative gain from Liberal Democrats		Swing		

=== Matson and Robinswood ===
Matson and Robinswood 2008
Party	Candidate	Votes	%	±%
Labour	Mary Denise Smith	982	42	
Conservative	Ruth Lesley Jacobs	896	38	
UKIP	Mike Smith	243	10	
Liberal Democrats	Jonathon Christopher Trigg	237	10	
Turnout		2358		
Labour hold		Swing		

=== Moreland ===
Moreland 2008
Party	Candidate	Votes	%	±%
Labour	Mark Anthony Hobbs	772	40	
Conservative	Lyn Cinderey	729	38	
Liberal Democrats	Andrew George Meads	155	8	
Green	Bryan John Meloy	130	7	
UKIP	Richard John Edwards	122	6	
Turnout		1908		
Labour hold		Swing		

=== Tuffley ===
Tuffley 2008
Party	Candidate	Votes	%	±%
Conservative	Gerald Charles Dee	781	44	
Independent	Phil Jordan	594	33	
Labour	Steve Lugg	327	18	
Liberal Democrats	Michael Power	74	4	
Turnout		1776		
Conservative hold		Swing		
