= 1973 Gloucester City Council election =

UK local election

The 1973 Gloucester City Council election took place on 5 May 1973 to elect members of Gloucester City Council in England.

== Results ==
Gloucester City Council election, 1973
Party	Seats	Gains	Losses	Net gain/loss	Seats %	Votes %	Votes	+/−
Conservative	21				63.6			
Labour	12				36.4			
Liberal	0				0.0			

== Ward results ==
=== Barnwood ===
Barnwood 1973 (3)
Party	Candidate	Votes	%	±%
Conservative	K. Hyett	1,110	46.2	
Conservative	M. Smith	1,025		
Conservative	H. Phillips	1,023		
Labour	F. Gibbs	980	40.8	
Labour	C. Barnfield	977		
Labour	Ms. R. Layton	889		
Liberal	N. Drinan	313	13.0	
Turnout			42.1	
Conservative win (new seat)				
Conservative win (new seat)				
Conservative win (new seat)				

=== Barton ===
Barton 1973 (3)
Party	Candidate	Votes	%	±%
Labour	H. Worrall	892	47.0	
Labour	Ms. R. Layton	876		
Labour	R. Palmer	800		
Liberal	R. Best	558	29.4	
Liberal	R. Adlan	558		
Conservative	Newman C	446	23.5	
Democratic Liberal	A. Gee	434		
Turnout		4,564	33.1	
Conservative win (new seat)				
Labour win (new seat)				
Labour win (new seat)				

=== Eastgate ===
Eastgate 1973 (3)
Party	Candidate	Votes	%	±%
Conservative	G. Williams	989	41.3	
Labour	R. Dwyer	981	41.0	
Conservative	H. Harrison	965		
Conservative	J. Stanley	943		
Labour	Ms. M. Barber	913		
Labour	M. Layton	882		
Liberal	Ms. E. Sheppard	290	12.1	
Independent	E. Race	132	5.5	
Turnout		6,095	39.5	
Conservative win (new seat)				
Labour win (new seat)				
Conservative win (new seat)				

=== Hucclecote ===
Hucclecote 1973 (3)
Party	Candidate	Votes	%	±%
Conservative	R. Ashley	1,295	45.4	
Conservative	T. Wathen	1,259		
Conservative	P. Arnold	1,246		
Labour	D. Ferguson	1,036	36.4	
Labour	F. Henderson	845		
Labour	G. Heath	785		
Liberal	D. Gibbard	519	18.2	
Liberal	L. Liddington	499		
Turnout		7,484	43.8	
Conservative win (new seat)				
Conservative win (new seat)				
Conservative win (new seat)				

=== Kingsholm ===
Kingsholm 1973 (3)
Party	Candidate	Votes	%	±%
Conservative	P. Robins	1,165	54.0	
Conservative	F. King	1,156		
Conservative	R. Langston	1,136		
Liberal	Ms. M. Harris	581	26.9	
Labour	F. Davenport	412	19.1	
Turnout		4,450	33.5	
Conservative win (new seat)				
Conservative win (new seat)				
Conservative win (new seat)				

=== Linden ===
Linden 1973 (3)
Party	Candidate	Votes	%	±%
Labour	E. Davies	1,105	42.4	
Labour	C. Collins	1,101		
Conservative	L. Jones	1,011	38.8	
Labour	Ms. L. Steers	926		
Conservative	R. Readdie	923		
Conservative	Ms. L. Reeves	833		
Liberal	Ms. E. Drinan	492	18.9	
Turnout		6,391	41.3	
Conservative win (new seat)				
Labour win (new seat)				
Conservative win (new seat)				

=== Longlevens ===
Longlevens 1973 (3)
Party	Candidate	Votes	%	±%
Conservative	N. Partridge	1,430	47.5	
Conservative	G.* Goodwin	1,811		
Conservative	J. Robins	1,395		
Conservative	G. Goodwin	1,294		
Labour	F. Kelly	990	32.9	
Labour	J. Wilks	883		
Labour	D. Middlecote	817		
Liberal	P. Lukins	590	19.6	
Turnout		7,399	44.9	
Conservative win (new seat)				
Labour win (new seat)				
Conservative win (new seat)				

=== Matson ===
Matson 1973 (3)
Party	Candidate	Votes	%	±%
Labour	W. Goodenough	1,000	49.0	
Labour	A. Walters	984		
Labour	H. Morgan	980		
Conservative	S. Moreland	588	28.8	
Liberal	Ms. G. Halford	454	22.2	
Turnout		4,006	29.6	
Labour win (new seat)				
Labour win (new seat)				
Labour win (new seat)				

=== Podsmead ===
Podsmead 1973 (3)
Party	Candidate	Votes	%	±%
Labour	P. Harris	935	41.8	
Labour	W. Finch	928		
Labour	D. Toomey	871		
Liberal	D. Halford	813	36.4	
Liberal	R. Barber	679		
Liberal	D. Gardner	657		
Conservative	Ms. S. Lawless	488	21.8	
Conservative	D. Knight	485		
Conservative	F. Stephens	453		
Turnout		6,309	37.9	
Conservative win (new seat)				
Labour win (new seat)				
Labour win (new seat)				

=== Tuffley ===
Tuffley 1973 (3)
Party	Candidate	Votes	%	±%
Conservative	F. Price	1,215	41.8	
Conservative	R. Pitkin-Cocks	1,191		
Conservative	S. Smith	1,183		
Labour	E. Clayton	1,131	38.9	
Labour	B. Adlam	1,088		
Labour	T. Miles	1,013		
Liberal	J. Beard	564	19.4	
Liberal	Ms. D. Martin	441		
Turnout		7,826	52.3	
Conservative win (new seat)				
Conservative win (new seat)				
Conservative win (new seat)				

=== Westgate ===
Westgate 1973 (3)
Party	Candidate	Votes	%	±%
Conservative	Ms. F. Wilton	1,062	50.9	
Conservative	H. Fisher	1,057		
Conservative	P. Jones	974		
Labour	J. Paton	538	25.8	
Liberal	Ms. M. Warlow	485	23.3	
Labour	F. Stevens	473		
Turnout		4,589	31.1	
Conservative win (new seat)				
Conservative win (new seat)				
Conservative win (new seat)				
