= 1998 Gloucester City Council election =

UK local election

The 1998 Gloucester City Council election took place on 7 May 1998 to elect members of Gloucester City Council in England. Several new wards were created due to a boundary review.

== Results ==
Gloucester City Council election, 1998
Party	Seats	Gains	Losses	Net gain/loss	Seats %	Votes %	Votes	+/−
Conservative	4					35.6		
Labour	10				50.0	38.3		
Liberal Democrats	6					26.0		
Green	0					0.0		
Independent	0					0.0		
Other	0					0.1		

== Ward results ==
=== Abbeymead ===
Abbeymead (3) 1998
Party	Candidate	Votes	%	±%
Liberal Democrats	Ms. R. Holman	1,178	51.7	
Liberal Democrats	P. Lush	1,119		
Liberal Democrats	S. Reeve	1,013		
Conservative	A. Gravells	720	31.6	
Conservative	M. Rentell	598		
Conservative	M. Richings	582		
Labour	Ms. J. Grigg	381	16.7	
Labour	T. Smith	357		
Labour	M. Shepstone	315		
Turnout		7091		
Liberal Democrats win (new seat)				

=== Barnwood ===
Barnwood (3)1998
Party	Candidate	Votes	%	±%
Labour	A. Hanks	818	52.7	
Labour	D. Mockridge	711		
Labour	M. Lawlor	624		
Conservative	P. Beer	560	36.1	
Conservative	Ms. N. Richings	507		
Conservative	M. Day	491		
Liberal Democrats	K. Mitchell	174	11.2	
Liberal Democrats	Ms. N. West	157		
Liberal Democrats	U. Bhaimia	113		
Turnout		6033		
Labour hold		Swing		

=== Barton ===
Barton 1998
Party	Candidate	Votes	%	±%
Labour	T. Haines	638	71.4	
Conservative	L. Proctor	177	19.8	
Liberal Democrats	Ms. V. Ellis	78	8.7	
Turnout		4901		
Labour hold		Swing		

=== Eastgate ===
Eastgate 1998
Party	Candidate	Votes	%	±%
Labour	D. Duncan	943	64.3	
Conservative	H. Harrison	378	25.8	
Liberal Democrats	M. Ginwalla	146	10.0	
Turnout		5979		
Labour hold		Swing		

=== Hucclecote ===
Hucclecote (3) 1998
Party	Candidate	Votes	%	±%
Liberal Democrats	Ms. S. Blakeley	1,542	47.4	
Liberal Democrats	W. Crowther	1,472		
Liberal Democrats	P. McLellan	1,457		
Conservative	C. Pullon	1176	36.1	
Conservative	Ms. E. Noakes	983		
Conservative	A. Franklin	887		
Labour	M. Dempsey	536	16.5	
Labour	Ms. C. Knapman	503		
Labour	M. Ferguson	476		
Turnout		7471		
Liberal Democrats win (new seat)				

=== Kingsholm ===
Kingsholm 1998
Party	Candidate	Votes	%	±%
Conservative	M. Hawthorne	1,250	52.1	
Liberal Democrats	D. Evans	734	30.6	
Labour	P. Barker	416	17.3	
Turnout		6453		
Conservative hold		Swing		

=== Linden ===
Linden 1998
Party	Candidate	Votes	%	±%
Labour	Ms. M. Smith	922	63.6	
Conservative	M. Taylor	401	27.7	
Liberal Democrats	Ms. V. Wilcox	126	8.7	
Turnout				
Labour hold		Swing		

=== Longlevens ===
Longlevens 1998
Party	Candidate	Votes	%	±%
Labour	D. Cook	828	38.9	
Conservative	Ms. S. McClung	757	35.6	
Liberal Democrats	Ms. Phillips V.	541	25.4	
Turnout		6695		
Labour hold		Swing		

=== Matson ===
Matson 1998
Party	Candidate	Votes	%	±%
Labour	K. Stephens	649	62.9	
Conservative	R. Cooke	246	23.9	
Liberal Democrats	G. Phillips	102	9.9	
Socialist	R. Frost	34	3.3	
Turnout		5495		
Labour hold		Swing		

=== Podsmead ===
Podsmead 1998
Party	Candidate	Votes	%	±%
Labour	A. Meredith	714	54.0	
Conservative	K. Moran	343	26.0	
Liberal Democrats	G. Slatter	264	20.0	
Turnout				
Labour hold		Swing		

=== Quedgeley ===
Quedgeley (2) 1998
Party	Candidate	Votes	%	±%
Conservative	G. Thompson	883	47.0	
Conservative	M. White	850		
Labour	A. McGonigle	581	30.9	
Liberal Democrats	D. Brearey	416	22.1	
Liberal Democrats	A. Balsham	413		
Labour	C. Clarke	412		
Turnout		7532		
Conservative hold		Swing		

=== Tuffley ===
Tuffley 1998
Party	Candidate	Votes	%	±%
Labour	N. Durrant	1,098	53.0	
Conservative	T. Leach	741	35.8	
Liberal Democrats	Ms. A. Evans	232	11.2	
Turnout		6161		
Labour hold		Swing		

=== Westgate ===
Westgate 1998
Party	Candidate	Votes	%	±%
Conservative	S. Morgan	664	41.8	
Liberal Democrats	Ms. B. Caldwell	519	32.7	
Labour	B. Large	406	25.6	
Turnout		5196		
Conservative hold		Swing		
