= 2007 Gloucester City Council election =

UK local election

← 2006	3 May 2007	2008 →

11 seats of 36 on the council 19 seats needed for a majority
	First party	Second party	Third party
Leader	Mark Hawthorne
Party	Conservative	Labour	Liberal Democrats
Seats before	16	8	12
Seats after	15	9	12
Seat change	▼1	▲1	Steady
- Results of the 2007 Gloucester City Council election

The 2007 Gloucester City Council election took place on 3 May 2007 to elect members of Gloucester City Council in England. The council remained under no overall control. Prior to the election the leader of the council was Mark Hawthorne, a Conservative, but he chose not to stand for re-election. Paul James was appointed leader after the election, continuing to lead a Conservative minority administration.

== Results summary ==
Gloucester City Council election, 2007
Party	Seats	Gains	Losses	Net gain/loss	Seats %	Votes %	Votes	+/−
Conservative	4					43		
Liberal Democrats	4					30		
Labour	3					22		
UKIP	0					3		
Green	0					3		

== Ward results ==
=== Abbey ===
Abbey 2007
Party	Candidate	Votes	%	±%
Conservative	Norman John Ravenhill	1,614	63	
Labour	Bernard James Mundy	497	19	
Liberal Democrats	Jason Dunsford	314	12	
UKIP	Danny Sparkes	135	5	
Turnout		2560		
Conservative hold		Swing		

=== Barnwood ===
Barnwood 2007
Party	Candidate	Votes	%	±%
Liberal Democrats	Phillip Taylor	1,151	42	
Conservative	Gordon Taylor	1090	39	
Labour	Jean Grigg	352	13	
UKIP	Mike Smith	108	4	
Green	Dee Kyne	66	2	
Turnout		2767		
Liberal Democrats hold		Swing		

=== Barton and Tredworth ===
Barton and Tredworth 2007
Party	Candidate	Votes	%	±%
Labour	Harjit Gill	1,012	41	
Liberal Democrats	Ahmed Shabbir Bham	813	33	
Conservative	Tarren Randle	449	18	
Green	Jennifer Maureen Hume	184	7	
Turnout		2458		
Labour hold		Swing		

=== Hucclecote ===
Hucclecote 2007
Party	Candidate	Votes	%	±%
Liberal Democrats	Declan Wilson	1,678	56	
Conservative	Malcolm Edwin Ogden	1049	35	
Labour	Roger Alfred James Mills	260	9	
Turnout		2987		
Liberal Democrats hold		Swing		

=== Kingsholm and Wotton ===
Kingsholm and Wotton 2007
Party	Candidate	Votes	%	±%
Liberal Democrats	Sebastian Richard Seymour Field	949	53	
Conservative	Robert Gough	599	33	
Labour	Judith Christine Robinson	255	14	
Turnout		1803		
Liberal Democrats hold		Swing		

=== Longlevens ===
Longlevens 2007
Party	Candidate	Votes	%	±%
Conservative	Kathy Williams	1,884	60	
Liberal Democrats	David John Brown	822	26	
Labour	Steve Frederick Richards	272	9	
UKIP	Frank Moran	158	5	
Turnout		3136		
Conservative hold		Swing		

=== Matson and Robinswood ===
Matson and Robinswood 2007
Party	Candidate	Votes	%	±%
Labour	Kate Haigh	1,066	43	
Conservative	Stuart Gavin Wilson	944	38	
Liberal Democrats	David Young	222	9	
UKIP	John George Todd	172	7	
Green	Anna Patricia Buckland	92	4	
Turnout		2496		
Labour gain from Conservative		Swing		

=== Moreland ===
Moreland 2007
Party	Candidate	Votes	%	±%
Labour	Geraldene Lilian Gillespie	881	42	
Conservative	Gerald Charles Dee	716	34	
Green	Bryan John Meloy	206	10	
Liberal Democrats	Paul Harries	180	9	
UKIP	Richard John Edwards	113	5	
Turnout		2096		
Labour hold		Swing		

=== Quedgeley Fieldcourt ===
Quedgeley Fieldcourt 2007
Party	Candidate	Votes	%	±%
Conservative	Debbie Llewellyn	728	58	
Labour	Gary Davis	246	20	
Liberal Democrats	Jonathan Christopher Trigg	164	13	
UKIP	Peter Gilmartin	113	9	
Turnout		1251		
Conservative hold		Swing		

=== Quedgeley Severn Vale ===
Quedgeley Severn Vale 2007
Party	Candidate	Votes	%	±%
Conservative	Martyn White	840	61	
Labour	Margaret Onians	306	22	
Liberal Democrats	Andrew George Meads	238	17	
Turnout		1384		
Conservative hold		Swing		

=== Westgate ===
Westgate 2007
Party	Candidate	Votes	%	±%
Liberal Democrats	Gordon Heath	692	50	
Conservative	Marilyn Anne Champion	498	36	
Labour	Peter Reed	130	9	
Green	Jack Martin Hallett	62	4	
Turnout		1382		
Liberal Democrats hold		Swing		
