= 1979 Gloucester City Council election =

UK local election

The 1979 Gloucester City Council election took place on 5 May 1979 to elect members of Gloucester City Council in England.

== Results ==
Gloucester City Council election, 1979
Party	Seats	Gains	Losses	Net gain/loss	Seats %	Votes %	Votes	+/−
Conservative	25				75.5			
Labour	7				21.2			
Liberal	1				3.0			

== Ward results ==
=== Barnwood ===
Barnwood 1979 (3)
Party	Candidate	Votes	%	±%
Conservative	B. Mason	2,436	45.2	
Conservative	M. Smith	2,421		
Conservative	M. Wooltorton	2,269		
Labour	D. Cosstick	1,989	36.9	
Labour	Ms. E. Hedge	1,963		
Labour	T. Rippin			
Liberal	M. Leach	969	18.0	
Turnout		13,798	79.5	
Conservative hold		Swing		

=== Barton ===
Barton 1979 (3)
Party	Candidate	Votes	%	±%
Labour	P. Collins	1,953	45.4	
Labour	D. Ferguson	1,850		
Labour	P. Harris	1,764	13.5	
Conservative	Ms. G. Hyett	1,671	38.8	
Conservative	A. Gravells	1,640		
Conservative	Ms. M. Gorton	1,277		
Liberal	W. Paterson	682	15.8	
Turnout		10,777	71.3	
Labour gain from Conservative		Swing		

=== Eastgate ===
Eastgate 1979 (3)
Party	Candidate	Votes	%	±%
Conservative	G. Williams	1,920	43.9	
Conservative	Ms. I. Fowler	1,866		
Conservative	Ms. J. Bracey	1,795		
Labour	C. Edgington	1,716	39.3	
Conservative	Ms. I. Cosstick	1,619		
Labour	B. Randell	1,613		
Liberal	Ms. W. Steele	734	16.8	
Liberal	Ms. M. Carter	711		
Liberal	Ms. S. Hutchinson	634		
Turnout		12,608	73.9	
Conservative hold		Swing		

=== Hucclecote ===
Hucclecote 1979 (3)
Party	Candidate	Votes	%	±%
Conservative	T. Wathen	2,998	54.3	
Conservative	P. Arnold	2,930		
Conservative	C. Pullon	2,749		
Labour	F. Henderson	1,387	25.1	
Labour	J. Curtis	1,374		
Labour	G. Heath	1,336		
Liberal	Cox R.	1,134	20.5	
Turnout		13,908	84.4	
Conservative hold		Swing		

=== Kingsholm ===
Kingsholm 1979 (3)
Party	Candidate	Votes	%	±%
Conservative	R. Langston	2,708	52.9	
Conservative	P. Robins	2,518		
Conservative	L. Journeaux	2,329		
Labour	M. Williams	1,350	26.4	
Labour	Ms. C. Lomas	1,206		
Labour	P. Smith	1,157		
Liberal	Ms. G. Halford	1,059	20.7	
Turnout		12,327	81.9	
Conservative hold		Swing		

=== Linden ===
Linden 1979 (3)
Party	Candidate	Votes	%	±%
Conservative	Ms. M. Lewis	2,064	45.4	
Conservative	L. Jones	1,967		
Conservative	P. Lever	1,802		
Labour	Ms. S. Edgington	1,728	38.0	
Labour	G. Melton	1,659		
Labour	M. Hyde	1,647		
Liberal	Ms. E. Drinan	752	16.5	
Turnout		11,619	78.7	
Conservative hold		Swing		

=== Longlevens ===
Longlevens 1979 (3)
Party	Candidate	Votes	%	±%
Conservative	N. Partridge	2,654	45.5	
Conservative	G. Goodwin	2,579		
Conservative	J. Robins	2,557		
Labour	Ms. S. Day	1,594	27.3	
Labour	Ms. A. Kelly	1,428		
Labour	Ms. J. Feher	1,378		
Liberal	D. Hodges	811	13.9	
Independent	M. Butler	774	13.3	
Turnout		13,775	84.3	
Conservative hold		Swing		

=== Matson ===
Matson 1979 (3)
Party	Candidate	Votes	%	±%
Labour	Ms. M. Barber	2,233	49.2	
Labour	H. Morgan	2,198		
Labour	A. Walters	2,136		
Conservative	P. Tartaglia	1,567	34.5	
Conservative	G. Marsh	1,412		
Conservative	I. Blakeley	1,409		
Liberal	T. Mulvey	737	16.2	
Turnout		11,692	76.5	
Labour hold		Swing		

=== Podsmead ===
Podsmead 1979 (3)
Party	Candidate	Votes	%	±%
Liberal	D. Halford	2,219	43.9	
Labour	D. Toomey	1,427	28.2	
Conservative	D. Knibbs	1,408	27.9	
Conservative	F. Stephens	1,381		
Conservative	L. Jones	1,312		
Liberal	Barber R.	1,258		
Liberal	R. Gibbs	1,246		
Labour	C. Barnfield	1,165		
Labour	Ms. L. Steers	1,099		
Turnout		12,515	81.9	
Liberal gain from Labour		Swing		
Labour gain from Liberal		Swing		
Conservative hold		Swing		

=== Tuffley ===
Tuffley 1979 (3)
Party	Candidate	Votes	%	±%
Conservative	S. Smith	2,268	49.1	
Conservative	R. Pitkin-Cocks	2,258		
Conservative	F. Price	2,247		
Labour	F. Wilton	1,686	36.5	
Labour	D. Millin	1,600		
Labour	F. Davenport	1,469		
Liberal	J. Simpson	665	14.4	
Turnout		12,193	82.5	
Conservative hold		Swing		

=== Westgate ===
Westgate 1979 (3)
Party	Candidate	Votes	%	±%
Conservative	Ms. F. Wilton	2,142	50.7	
Conservative	H. Fisher	2,044		
Conservative	C. Fudge	1,655		
Labour	J. Ewers	1,208	28.6	
Labour	S. Russell	1,600		
Labour	F. Stevens	1,064		
Liberal	J. Eaton	874	20.7	
Turnout		10,165		
Conservative hold		Swing		
