= 2006 Gloucester City Council election =

UK local election

← 2004	4 May 2006	2007 →

15 seats of 36 on the council 19 seats needed for a majority
	First party	Second party	Third party
Leader	Mark Hawthorne
Party	Conservative	Labour	Liberal Democrats
Seats before	16	8	12
Seats after	16	8	12
Seat change	Steady	Steady	Steady
- Results of the 2006 Gloucester City Council election

The 2006 Gloucester City Council election took place on 4 May 2006 to elect members of Gloucester City Council in England. Fifteen of the 36 seats on the council were up for election, representing a nominal "third" of the council. No seats changed party at the election, and the council remainder under no overall control. The council continued to be run by a Conservative minority administration, with Mark Hawthorne remaining leader of the council after the election.

== Results summary ==
Gloucester City Council election, 2006
Party	Seats	Gains	Losses	Net gain/loss	Seats %	Votes %	Votes	+/−
Conservative	7						13,615	
Liberal Democrats	4						8,884	
Labour	4						6,834	
Green	0						547	
UKIP	0						464	

== Ward results ==
=== Abbey ===
Abbey 2006
Party	Candidate	Votes	%	±%
Conservative	Andrew Gravells	1,739	66.5	
Labour	Bernard Mundy	408	15.6	
Liberal Democrats	John McFeely	364	13.9	
UKIP	Danny Sparkes	105	4.0	
Turnout				
Conservative hold		Swing		

=== Barnwood ===
Barnwood 2006
Party	Candidate	Votes	%	±%
Liberal Democrats	Philip McLellan	1,285	48.3	
Conservative	Anthony Powell	1031	38.7	
Labour	Judith Robinson	347	13.0	
Turnout				
Liberal Democrats hold		Swing		

=== Barton and Tredworth ===
Barton and Tredworth 2006
Party	Candidate	Votes	%	±%
Labour	Carol Francis	943	47.6	
Liberal Democrats	James Harries	455	23.0	
Conservative	Tarren Randle	421	21.3	
Green	Jennifer Hume	162	8.2	
Turnout				
Labour hold		Swing		

=== Elmbridge ===
Elmbridge 2006
Party	Candidate	Votes	%	±%
Liberal Democrats	Christopher Witts	1,020	51.2	
Conservative	Gordon Taylor	712	35.7	
Labour	Terence Haines	262	13.1	
Turnout				
Liberal Democrats hold		Swing		

=== Grange ===
Grange 2006
Party	Candidate	Votes	%	±%
Conservative	Nigel Hanman	1,042	57.0	
Labour	Garry Mills	548	30.0	
Liberal Democrats	Cedric Clarke	237	13.0	
Turnout				
Conservative hold		Swing		

=== Hucclecote ===
Hucclecote 2006
Party	Candidate	Votes	%	±%
Liberal Democrats	Jonathan Whittaker	1,575	51.9	
Conservative	Malcolm Ogden	1189	39.2	
Labour	Kay Mills	272	9.0	
Turnout				
Liberal Democrats hold		Swing		

=== Kingsholm and Wotton ===
Kingsholm and Wotton 2006
Party	Candidate	Votes	%	±%
Liberal Democrats	Jeremy Hilton	974	52.9	
Conservative	Christine Lyle	573	31.1	
Labour	Katherine Haigh	293	15.9	
Turnout				
Liberal Democrats hold		Swing		

=== Longlevens ===
Longlevens 2006
Party	Candidate	Votes	%	±%
Conservative	Paul James	1,962	57.2	
Liberal Democrats	Amanda Jones	1256	36.6	
Labour	Steven Richards	215	6.3	
Turnout				
Conservative hold		Swing		

=== Matson and Robinswood ===
Matson and Robinswood 2006
Party	Candidate	Votes	%	±%
Labour	Janet Lugg	1,081	45.1	
Conservative	Brian Edge	847	35.3	
Liberal Democrats	Natalie West	241	10.1	
UKIP	John Todd	228	9.5	
Turnout				
Labour hold		Swing		

=== Moreland ===
Moreland 2006
Party	Candidate	Votes	%	±%
Labour	Nicholas Durrant	890	43.6	
Conservative	Duncan Hall	605	29.6	
Green	Bryan Meloy	215	10.5	
Liberal Democrats	Andrew Meads	201	9.8	
UKIP	Richard Edwards	131	6.4	
Turnout				
Labour hold		Swing		

=== Podsmead ===
Podsmead 2006
Party	Candidate	Votes	%	±%
Labour	Michael Lawlor	412	43.9	
Conservative	Gerald Dee	274	29.2	
Liberal Democrats	Rebecca O'Connor	252	26.9	
Turnout				
Labour hold		Swing		

=== Quedgeley Fieldcourt ===
Quedgeley Fieldcourt 2006
Party	Candidate	Votes	%	±%
Conservative	Elaine Emerton	726	62.7	
Labour	Mary Mahon-Creasey	266	23.0	
Liberal Democrats	Jonathan Trigg	166	14.3	
Turnout				
Conservative hold		Swing		

=== Quedgeley Severn Vale ===
Quedgeley Field Vale 2006
Party	Candidate	Votes	%	±%
Conservative	Andrew Lewis	869	65.4	
Labour	Dylan Green	277	20.8	
Liberal Democrats	Patricia Duggan	183	13.8	
Turnout				
Conservative hold		Swing		

=== Tuffley ===
Tuffley 2006
Party	Candidate	Votes	%	±%
Conservative	Brian Crawford	907	51.8	
Labour	Stephen Lugg	476	27.2	
Liberal Democrats	Patrick Lush	197	11.3	
Turnout				
Conservative hold		Swing		

=== Westgate ===
Westgate 2006
Party	Candidate	Votes	%	±%
Conservative	Pamela Tracey	718	53.6	
Liberal Democrats	Richard Trelfa	478	35.7	
Labour	Clive Lewis	144	10.7	
Turnout				
Conservative hold		Swing		
