= 2014 Gloucester City Council election =

UK local election

← 2012	22 May 2014	2015 →

15 seats of 36 on council 19 seats needed for a majority
	First party	Second party	Third party
Leader	Paul James	Kate Haigh	Jeremy Hilton
Party	Conservative	Labour	Liberal Democrats
Seats before	18	8	10
Seats after	18	8	10
Seat change	Steady	Steady	Steady
- Results of the 2014 Gloucester City Council election

The 2014 Gloucester City Council election took place on 22 May 2014 to elect members of Gloucester City Council in England. This was on the same day as other local elections. Fifteen of the 36 seats on the council were up for election, representing a nominal third of the council. No seats changed party, and so the council remained under no overall control, with the Conservatives having exactly half the seats on the council. The Conservative leader, Paul James, continued to serve as leader of the council after the election.

== Results ==
The overall results were as follows:

Gloucester City Council election, 2014
Party	Seats	Gains	Losses	Net gain/loss	Seats %	Votes %	Votes	+/−
Conservative	8				53%	38%	11,889	
Labour	3				20%	26%	8,110	
Liberal Democrats	4				27%	18%	5,800	
UKIP	0					14%	4,539	
Green	0					3%	963	
TUSC	0					0%	133	

== Ward results ==
The results in each ward were as follows (candidates with an asterisk* were the previous incumbent standing for re-election):

Abbey ward
Party	Candidate	Votes	%	±%
Conservative	Andrew Gravells*	1,382	51%	
UKIP	Danny Sparkes	611	23%	
Labour	Bernard James Mundy	531	20%	
Liberal Democrats	Sarah Dobson	173	6%	
Turnout		2697	36%	
Conservative hold		Swing		

Barnwood ward
Party	Candidate	Votes	%	±%
Liberal Democrats	Philip Stuart McLellan*	1,148	41%	
Conservative	Laura Suzanne Pearsall	745	26%	
UKIP	Stephen Leslie Pottage	496	18%	
Labour	Shaun James Shute	355	13%	
Green	Adam Paul Van Coevorden	76	3%	
TUSC	Susan Powell	11	0%	
Turnout		2831	36%	
Liberal Democrats hold		Swing		

Barton and Tredworth ward
Party	Candidate	Votes	%	±%
Labour	Said Hansdot*	1,097	51%	
Conservative	Hasan Patel	879	41%	
TUSC	Catherine Abigail Bailey	93	4%	
Liberal Democrats	Paul Harries	86	4%	
Turnout		2155	29%	
Labour hold		Swing		

Elmbridge ward
Party	Candidate	Votes	%	±%
Liberal Democrats	Chris Witts*	692	43%	
Conservative	Joseph Laxton McAleer	315	19%	
UKIP	Chris Wallin	277	17%	
Labour	Roger John Martin	252	16%	
Green	Frances Joan Griffiths	81	5%	
Turnout		1617	36%	
Liberal Democrats hold		Swing		

Grange ward
Party	Candidate	Votes	%	±%
Conservative	Nigel Joseph Hanman*	725	40%	
Labour	Pat Juby	532	29%	
UKIP	Rosemarie Jean Marchmont	498	27%	
Liberal Democrats	Anthony James Gowing	63	3%	
Turnout		1818	40%	
Conservative hold		Swing		

Hucclecote ward
Party	Candidate	Votes	%	±%
Liberal Democrats	Jim Beeley*	1,455	53%	
Conservative	Chris Etheridge	918	33%	
Labour	Tom Coole	382	14%	
Turnout		2755	39%	
Liberal Democrats hold		Swing		

Kingsholm and Wotton ward
Party	Candidate	Votes	%	±%
Liberal Democrats	Jeremy Hilton*	880	52%	
Labour	Jonathan Richard Hoad	342	20%	
Conservative	Matthew Mark Stevens	317	19%	
Green	Jonathan Cecil Ingleby	153	9%	
Turnout		1692	31%	
Liberal Democrats hold		Swing		

Longlevens ward
Party	Candidate	Votes	%	±%
Conservative	Paul Simon James*	1,545	50%	
UKIP	Susannah Collier	683	22%	
Labour	Terry Haines	463	15%	
Liberal Democrats	Jonathan Michael Whittaker	282	9%	
Green	Christopher David Britton	135	4%	
Turnout		3108	41%	
Conservative hold		Swing		

Matson and Robinswood ward
Party	Candidate	Votes	%	±%
Labour	Jan Lugg*	906	39%	
UKIP	Gary Frederick Cleaver	731	31%	
Conservative	Duncan Hall	456	20%	
Green	Ros Durrant	127	5%	
Liberal Democrats	John McFeely	74	3%	
TUSC	John Ewers	29	1%	
Turnout		2323	31%	
Labour hold		Swing		

Moreland ward
Party	Candidate	Votes	%	±%
Labour	Terry Pullen	788	33%	
Conservative	Lyn Ackroyd	727	31%	
UKIP	Richard John Edwards	563	24%	
Green	Charley Bircher	213	9%	
Liberal Democrats	Mike Anderton	62	3%	
Turnout		2353	32%	
Labour hold		Swing		

Podsmead ward
Party	Candidate	Votes	%	±%
Conservative	Jennie Rutheva Dallimore*	366	42%	
Labour	Garry Mills	308	35%	
UKIP	Mike Smith	189	22%	
Liberal Democrats	Vicki Field	15	2%	
Turnout		878	39%	
Conservative hold		Swing		

Quedgeley Fieldcourt ward
Party	Candidate	Votes	%	±%
Conservative	David Foley Norman	1,060	50%	
Labour	Kevin Phillip Neal	749	35%	
Liberal Democrats	Kira Barnes-Moffatt	326	15%	
Turnout		2135	26%	
Conservative hold		Swing		

Quedgeley Severn Vale ward
Party	Candidate	Votes	%	±%
Conservative	Andrew Steven Lewis*	813	54%	
Labour	Wayne William Roberts	473	31%	
Liberal Democrats	Joanne Marie Brown	226	15%	
Turnout		1512	28%	
Conservative hold		Swing		

Tuffley ward
Party	Candidate	Votes	%	±%
Conservative	Colin Adrian Organ*	789	40%	
Labour	Tracy Sharon Millard	607	31%	
UKIP	Daryl Phillip Stanbury	491	25%	
Liberal Democrats	Paul Harris	70	4%	
Turnout		1957	42%	
Conservative hold		Swing		

Westgate ward
Party	Candidate	Votes	%	±%
Conservative	Pam Tracey*	852	53%	
Labour	Abdul Aziz Atcha	325	20%	
Liberal Democrats	Howard Hyman	248	15%	
Green	Matthew John Sidford	178	11%	
Turnout		1603	29%	
Conservative hold		Swing		
