= 1976 Gloucester City Council election =

UK local election

The 1976 Gloucester City Council election took place on 5 May 1976 to elect members of Gloucester City Council in England.

== Results ==
Gloucester City Council election, 1976
Party	Seats	Gains	Losses	Net gain/loss	Seats %	Votes %	Votes	+/−
Conservative	27				81.8			
Labour	5				15.2			
Liberal	1				3.0			

== Ward results ==
=== Barnwood ===
Barnwood 1976 (3)
Party	Candidate	Votes	%	±%
Conservative	K.* Hyett	1,400	52.1	
Conservative	M.* Smith	1,320		
Conservative	H.* Phillips	1,307		
Labour	F. Davenport	1,056	39.3	
Labour	P. Collins	1,055		
Labour	C. Barnfield	977		
Liberal	C. Tanner	229	8.5	
Turnout		7,557	47.4	
Conservative hold		Swing		
Conservative hold		Swing		
Conservative hold		Swing		

=== Barton ===
Barton 1976 (3)
Party	Candidate	Votes	%	±%
Conservative	Ms. G. Hyett	1,037	44.5	
Labour	H.* Layton	886	38.0	
Conservative	A. Gravells	840		
Labour	Ms. R. Layton	764		
Labour	D. Ferguson	735		
Conservative	M. Wooltorton	690		
Liberal	W. Paterson	409	17.5	
Liberal	M. Leach	259		
Turnout		5,620	39.7	
Conservative gain from Labour		Swing		
Labour hold		Swing		
Conservative gain from Labour		Swing		

=== Eastgate ===
Eastgate 1976 (3)
Party	Candidate	Votes	%	±%
Conservative	H.* Harrison	1,181	52.7	
Conservative	E. Race	1,161		
Conservative	G.* Williams	1,147		
Labour	R.* Dwyer	834	37.2	
Labour	F. Kelly	766		
Labour	W. Jenkins	732		
Liberal	Ms. M. Carter	228	10.2	
Liberal	Ms. S. Hutchinson	207		
Liberal	D. Carter	187		
Turnout		6,443	43.9	
Conservative hold		Swing		
Conservative gain from Labour		Swing		
Conservative hold		Swing		

=== Hucclecote ===
Hucclecote 1976 (3)
Party	Candidate	Votes	%	±%
Conservative	C. Pullon	1,917	61.2	
Conservative	T.* Wathen	1,913		
Conservative	P.* Arnold	1,821		
Labour	D. Farmer	862	27.5	
Labour	F. Henderson	822		
Labour	G. Heath	803		
Liberal	R. Cox	352	11.2	
Liberal	L. Liddington	311		
Liberal	Ms. P. Liddington	294		
Turnout		9,095	53.3	
Conservative hold		Swing		
Conservative hold		Swing		
Conservative hold		Swing		

=== Kingsholm ===
Kingsholm 1976 (3)
Party	Candidate	Votes	%	±%
Conservative	P.* Robins	1,783	60.1	
Conservative	R.* Langston	1,763		
Conservative	F.* King	1,691		
Labour	M. Williams	759	25.6	
Labour	E. Clayton	724		
Labour	Ms. L. Gibbs	724		
Liberal	Ms. G. Halford	425	14.3	
Turnout		7,869	52.2	
Conservative hold		Swing		
Conservative hold		Swing		
Conservative hold		Swing		

=== Linden ===
Linden 1976 (3)
Party	Candidate	Votes	%	±%
Conservative	Ms. M. Lewis	1,341	50.0	
Conservative	L.* Jones	1,302		
Conservative	D. Knight	1,229		
Labour	R.* Davies	1,073	40.0	
Labour	C.* Collins	914		
Labour	Matthews W.	752		
Liberal	Ms. E. Drinan	268	10.0	
Liberal	Ms. E. Hodgson	223		
Turnout		7,102	48.0	
Conservative gain from Labour		Swing		
Conservative gain from Labour		Swing		
Conservative hold		Swing		

=== Longlevens ===
Longlevens 1976 (3)
Party	Candidate	Votes	%	±%
Conservative	N. Partridge	1,840	59.7	
Conservative	G.* Goodwin	1,811		
Conservative	J.* Robins	1,783		
Labour	J. Day	973	31.6	
Labour	Ms. J. Feher	901		
Labour	J. Wilks	900		
Liberal	C. Turnbull	270	8.8	
Liberal	G. Whelan	230		
Turnout		9,681	53.5	
Conservative gain from Labour		Swing		
Conservative gain from Labour		Swing		
Conservative hold		Swing		

=== Matson ===
Matson 1976 (3)
Party	Candidate	Votes	%	±%
Labour	H.* Morgan	924	47.1	
Labour	A.* Walters	852		
Labour	M. Hyde	832		
Conservative	H. Isherwood	807	41.2	
Conservative	Ms. G. Ablett	772		
Conservative	Ms. L. Pressey	719		
Liberal	T. Mulvey		11.7	
Liberal	Ms. V. Tanner	169		
Liberal	Ms. D. Wjunek	127		
Turnout		5,432	34.0	
Labour hold		Swing		
Labour hold		Swing		
Labour hold		Swing		

=== Podsmead ===
Podsmead 1976 (3)
Party	Candidate	Votes	%	±%
Labour	*D. Toomey	1,003	34.7	
Liberal	D. Halford	982	34.0	
Conservative	Ms. I. Fowler	907	31.4	
Labour	P.* Harris	906		
Conservative	F. Stephens	831		
Conservative	B. Turner	794		
Liberal	M. Talwar	758		
Liberal	Ms. M. Harris	741		
Liberal	E. Young	627		
Turnout			49.2	
Labour hold		Swing		
Liberal gain from Labour		Swing		
Conservative hold		Swing		

=== Tuffley ===
Tuffley 1976 (3)
Party	Candidate	Votes	%	±%
Conservative	F.* Price	1,573	54.5	
Conservative	S.* Smith	1,566		
Conservative	R.* Pitkin-Cocks	1,541		
Labour	F. Wilton	985	34.1	
Labour	D. Millin	943		
Labour	T. Miles	937		
Liberal	R. Mather	330	11.4	
Liberal	C. James	328		
Liberal	J. Jay	260		
Turnout		8,463	57.0	
Conservative hold		Swing		
Conservative hold		Swing		
Conservative hold		Swing		

=== Westgate ===
Westgate 1976 (3)
Party	Candidate	Votes	%	±%
Conservative	Ms.* F. Wilton	1,332	64.5	
Conservative	H.* Fisher	1,223		
Conservative	T. Herbert	1,133		
Labour	F. Stevens	435	21.1	
Labour	C. Edgington	407		
Labour	R. Escolme	405		
Liberal	D. Warner	299	14.5	
Liberal	Ms. E. Warner	241		
Turnout		5,475	35.9	
Conservative hold		Swing		
Conservative hold		Swing		
Conservative hold		Swing		
