= 2000 Gloucester City Council election =

UK local election

The 2000 Gloucester City Council election took place on 5 May 2000 to elect members of Gloucester City Council in England. The council elected a third of the council and was controlled by the Labour Party.

== Results ==
Gloucester City Council election, 2000
| Party | Seats | Gains | Losses | Net gain/loss | Seats % | Votes % | Votes | +/− |
|---|---|---|---|---|---|---|---|---|
| Labour | 20 | | | | | | | |
| Conservative | 8 | | | | | | | |
| Liberal Democrats | 8 | | | | | | | |
| Independent | 1 | | | | | | | |

== Ward results ==
=== Abbeymead ===
Abbeymead 2000
| Party | Candidate | Votes | % | ±% |
|---|---|---|---|---|
| Conservative | A. Gravells | 1,051 | 46.1 | |
| Liberal Democrats | S. Reeves | 999 | 44.1 | |
| Labour | R. Price | 214 | 9.5 | |
| Turnout | | | | |
| Conservative win (new seat) | | | | |

=== Barnwood ===
Barnwood 2000
| Party | Candidate | Votes | % | ±% |
|---|---|---|---|---|
| Labour | Ms. J Robinson | 656 | 39.4 | |
| Conservative | M. Rentell | 599 | 36.0 | |
| Liberal Democrats | Lush B. Ms. | 408 | 24.5 | |
| Turnout | | | | |
| Labour hold | | Swing | | |

=== Barton ===
Barton 2000
| Party | Candidate | Votes | % | ±% |
|---|---|---|---|---|
| Labour | E. Garwood | 706 | 63.1 | |
| Conservative | L. Proctor | 271 | 24.2 | |
| Liberal Democrats | Ms. V. Ellis | 142 | 12.7 | |
| Turnout | | | | |
| Labour hold | | Swing | | |

=== Eastgate ===
Eastgate 2000
| Party | Candidate | Votes | % | ±% |
|---|---|---|---|---|
| Labour | Ms. C. Francis | 810 | 56.3 | |
| Conservative | T. King | 475 | 33.0 | |
| Liberal Democrats | G. Phillips | 155 | 10.8 | |
| Turnout | | | | |
| Labour hold | | Swing | | |

=== Hucclecote ===
Hucclecote 2000
| Party | Candidate | Votes | % | ±% |
|---|---|---|---|---|
| Liberal Democrats | P. McLellan | 1,482 | 49.1 | |
| Conservative | Ms. E. Noakes | 1228 | 40.7 | |
| Labour | Ms. H. Base | 307 | 10.2 | |
| Turnout | | | | |
| Liberal Democrats win (new seat) | | | | |

=== Kingsholm ===
Kingsholm 2000
| Party | Candidate | Votes | % | ±% |
|---|---|---|---|---|
| Conservative | P. James | 1,544 | 64.3 | |
| Liberal Democrats | D. Evans | 474 | 19.7 | |
| Labour | M. Ferguson | 385 | 16.0 | |
| Turnout | | | | |
| Conservative hold | | Swing | | |

=== Linden ===
Linden 2000
| Party | Candidate | Votes | % | ±% |
|---|---|---|---|---|
| Labour | M. Hobbs | 634 | 50.5 | |
| Conservative | R. Cooke | 478 | 38.1 | |
| Liberal Democrats | Ms. L. Bert-Smith | 144 | 11.5 | |
| Turnout | | | | |
| Labour hold | | Swing | | |

=== Longlevens ===
Longlevens 2000
| Party | Candidate | Votes | % | ±% |
|---|---|---|---|---|
| Conservative | C. Witts | 1,098 | 43.7 | |
| Labour | Ms. S. McClung | 782 | 31.1 | |
| Liberal Democrats | D. Hitchings | 633 | 25.2 | |
| Turnout | | | | |
| Conservative hold | | Swing | | |

=== Matson ===
Matson 2000
| Party | Candidate | Votes | % | ±% |
|---|---|---|---|---|
| Labour | D. Cosstick | 756 | 51.1 | |
| Conservative | G. Carruthers | 506 | 34.2 | |
| Liberal Democrats | Drinan E. Ms. | 217 | 14.7 | |
| Turnout | | | | |
| Labour hold | | Swing | | |

=== Podsmead ===
Podsmead 2000
| Party | Candidate | Votes | % | ±% |
|---|---|---|---|---|
| Labour | J. Gill | 565 | 41.4 | |
| Conservative | Ms. B. Monkhouse | 558 | 40.8 | |
| Liberal Democrats | C. Reed | 432 | 17.8 | |
| Turnout | | | | |
| Labour hold | | Swing | | |

=== Tuffley ===
Tuffley (2) 2000
| Party | Candidate | Votes | % | ±% |
|---|---|---|---|---|
| Conservative | B. Crawford | 675 | 50.2 | |
| Labour | Lugg J. Ms. | 670 | 49.8 | |
| Labour | Ms. R. Onians | 649 | | |
| Conservative | Ms. A. Suddards-Moss | 612 | | |
| Turnout | | | | |
| Conservative hold | | Swing | | |

=== Westgate ===
Westgate (2) 2000
| Party | Candidate | Votes | % | ±% |
|---|---|---|---|---|
| Conservative | Ms. P. Tracey | 632 | 49.1 | |
| Conservative | S. Morgan | 563 | | |
| Liberal Democrats | G. Heath | 479 | 37.2 | |
| Liberal Democrats | A. Meads | 386 | | |
| Labour | T. Barrett | 177 | 13.7 | |
| Labour | Ms. E. Garwood | 160 | | |
| Turnout | | | | |
| Conservative hold | | Swing | | |
