= 2004 Gloucester City Council election =

UK local election

| ← 2003 | 10 June 2004 | 2006 → |

10 seats of 36 on the council 19 seats needed for a majority
| | First party | Second party | Third party |
|---|---|---|---|
| Leader | Mark Hawthorne | Mary Smith | Bill Crowther |
| Party | Conservative | Labour | Liberal Democrats |
| Seats before | 14 | 11 | 11 |
| Seats after | 16 | 8 | 12 |
| Seat change | ▲2 | ▼3 | ▲1 |
- Results of the 2004 Gloucester City Council election

The 2004 Gloucester City Council election took place on 10 June 2004 to elect members of Gloucester City Council in England. Ten of the 36 seats on the council were up for election, representing a nominal "third" of the council; there were no elections for Kingsholm and Wotton, Podsmead, Quedgeley Fieldcourt, Quedgeley Severn Vale or Westgate wards in 2004. The council remained under no overall control. Prior to the election the Labour and Liberal Democrats groups had been running a joint administration, with Mary Smith of Labour being the leader of the council. After the election, a Conservative minority administration was formed instead, with Mark Hawthorne becoming leader of the council.

== Results summary ==
Gloucester City Council election, 2004
| Party | Seats | Gains | Losses | Net gain/loss | Seats % | Votes % | Votes | +/− |
|---|---|---|---|---|---|---|---|---|
| Conservative | 4 | 3 | 1 | +2 | | 41.1 | 9,586 | |
| Liberal Democrats | 4 | 2 | 1 | +1 | | 30.7 | 7,167 | |
| Labour | 2 | | 3 | -3 | | 24.3 | 5,680 | |
| Green | 0 | | | | | 2.9 | 679 | |
| English Democrat | 0 | | | | | 0.6 | 150 | |
| Socialist | 0 | | | | | 0.3 | 68 | |

== Ward results ==
=== Abbey ===
Abbey 2004
| Party | Candidate | Votes | % | ±% |
|---|---|---|---|---|
| Conservative | Robert Gardiner | 1,462 | | |
| Labour | Maria Griffin | 502 | | |
| Liberal Democrats | David Brown | 405 | | |
| Green | Stuart Croft | 148 | | |
| Turnout | | | | |
| Conservative hold | | Swing | | |

=== Barnwood ===
Barnwood 2004
| Party | Candidate | Votes | % | ±% |
|---|---|---|---|---|
| Conservative | Elizabeth Noakes | 1,048 | | |
| Liberal Democrats | Kenneth Mitchell | 1,005 | | |
| Labour | David Purchase | 408 | | |
| Turnout | | | | |
| Conservative gain from Liberal Democrats | | Swing | | |

=== Barton and Tredworth ===
Barton and Tredworth 2004
| Party | Candidate | Votes | % | ±% |
|---|---|---|---|---|
| Liberal Democrats | Usman Bhaimia | 753 | | |
| Labour | Rose Workman | 728 | | |
| Conservative | Philip King | 384 | | |
| Green | Jason Wilson | 132 | | |
| Socialist | John Ewers | 68 | | |
| Turnout | | | | |
| Liberal Democrats gain from Labour | | Swing | | |

=== Elmbridge ===
Elmbridge 2004
| Party | Candidate | Votes | % | ±% |
|---|---|---|---|---|
| Liberal Democrats | Susan Jones | 742 | | |
| Conservative | Nicola Pollard | 692 | | |
| Labour | William Trehearne | 330 | | |
| Green | Mary Kyne | 90 | | |
| Turnout | | | | |
| Liberal Democrats hold | | Swing | | |

=== Grange ===
Grange 2004
| Party | Candidate | Votes | % | ±% |
|---|---|---|---|---|
| Conservative | Stephen Morgan | 885 | | |
| Labour | Garry Mills | 583 | | |
| Liberal Democrats | Julian Powell | 247 | | |
| Turnout | | | | |
| Conservative gain from Labour | | Swing | | |

=== Hucclecote ===
Hucclecote 2004
| Party | Candidate | Votes | % | ±% |
|---|---|---|---|---|
| Liberal Democrats | Susan Blakeley | 1,455 | | |
| Conservative | Malcolm Ogden | 1,075 | | |
| Labour | Kay Mills | 292 | | |
| English Democrat | Ian Holt | 150 | | |
| Green | Elinor Croxall | 78 | | |
| Turnout | | | | |
| Liberal Democrats hold | | Swing | | |

=== Longlevens ===
Longlevens 2004
| Party | Candidate | Votes | % | ±% |
|---|---|---|---|---|
| Liberal Democrats | Lucy Nethsingha | 1,704 | | |
| Conservative | Kathleen Williams | 1,650 | | |
| Labour | Dylan Green | 247 | | |
| Turnout | | | | |
| Liberal Democrats gain from Conservative | | Swing | | |

=== Matson and Robinswood ===
Matson and Robinswood 2004
| Party | Candidate | Votes | % | ±% |
|---|---|---|---|---|
| Labour | Mary Smith | 1,050 | | |
| Conservative | David Martin | 873 | | |
| Liberal Democrats | Natalie West | 350 | | |
| Turnout | | | | |
| Labour hold | | Swing | | |

=== Moreland ===
Moreland 2004
| Party | Candidate | Votes | % | ±% |
|---|---|---|---|---|
| Labour | Mark Hobbs | 915 | | |
| Conservative | Terence King | 695 | | |
| Liberal Democrats | Patrick Lush | 242 | | |
| Green | Bryan Meloy | 231 | | |
| Turnout | | | | |
| Labour hold | | Swing | | |

=== Tuffley ===
Tuffley 2004
| Party | Candidate | Votes | % | ±% |
|---|---|---|---|---|
| Conservative | Anne Suddards-Moss | 822 | | |
| Labour | Janet Lugg | 625 | | |
| Liberal Democrats | Jonathan Trigg | 264 | | |
| Turnout | | | | |
| Conservative gain from Labour | | Swing | | |
