= 2002 Gloucester City Council election =

UK local election

Results of the 2002 Gloucester City Council election

The 2002 Gloucester City Council election took place on 2 May 2002 to elect members of Gloucester City Council in England. There were boundary changes within Gloucester with Quedgeley being added to Gloucester and became a No Overall Control council, previously Labour-led.

== Results ==
Gloucester City Council election, 2002
Party	Seats	Gains	Losses	Net gain/loss	Seats %	Votes %	Votes	+/−
Conservative	14	+2				40.6	10391	
Labour	12	-7				30.7	7836	
Liberal Democrats	10	+3				26.6	6788	
UKIP	0		-1			0.9	225	
Socialist	0		-1			0.5	139	
Independent	0		-1			0.4	103	
CPA	0		-1			0.3	83	

== Ward results ==
=== Abbey ===
Abbey (3) 2002
Party	Candidate	Votes	%	±%
Conservative	Andrew Gravells	1,457	64.8	
Conservative	Robert Gardiner	1,337		
Conservative	Michael Rentell	1,266		
Labour	Jonathon Gill	462	20.6	
Labour	Hayley Base	385		
Liberal Democrats	Jonathan Trigg	328	14.6	
Labour	Anne Whitworth	325		
Liberal Democrats	Natalie West	317		
Turnout				
Conservative win (new seat)				

=== Barnwood ===
Barnwood (3) 2002
Party	Candidate	Votes	%	±%
Liberal Democrats	Philip McLellan	1,293	50.1	
Liberal Democrats	Kenneth Mitchell	1,143		
Liberal Democrats	Stephen Reeve	1,088		
Labour	Rosalinde Etheridge	649	25.2	
Conservative	John Carr	637	24.7	
Conservative	Elizabeth Noakes	636		
Conservative	Stuart Wilson	608		
Labour	Harjit Gill	596		
Labour	Judith Robinson	574		
Turnout				
Liberal Democrats hold		Swing		

=== Barton and Tredworth ===
Barton and Tredworth (3) 2002
Party	Candidate	Votes	%	±%
Labour	Carol Francis	850	65.7	
Labour	Rose Workman	803		
Labour	Bernard O'Neill	750		
Conservative	Leonard Proctor	305	23.6	
Conservative	Hubert Harrison	297		
Conservative	Philip German	286		
Socialist	Catherine Bailey	139	10.7	
Socialist	John Ewers	107		
Socialist	Gary Jones	84		
Turnout				
Labour hold		Swing		

=== Elmbridge ===
Elmbridge (2) 2002
Party	Candidate	Votes	%	±%
Liberal Democrats	Christopher Witts	760	42.3	
Liberal Democrats	Roger Smith	666		
Labour	Terence Haines	552	30.7	
Labour	David Cook	542		
Conservative	Doreen Watts	486	27.0	
Conservative	Susan Mclung	476		
Turnout				
Liberal Democrats hold		Swing		

=== Grange ===
Grange (2) 2002
Party	Candidate	Votes	%	±%
Conservative	Nigel Hanman	793	53.0	
Labour	Brian Large	702	47.0	
Labour	Kay Mills	679		
Conservative	Philip Awford	658		
Turnout				
Conservative hold		Swing		

=== Hucclecote ===
Hucclecote (3) 2002
Party	Candidate	Votes	%	±%
Liberal Democrats	William Crowther	1,588	62.2	
Liberal Democrats	Susan Blakeley	1,533		
Liberal Democrats	Declan Wilson	1,357		
Conservative	Maurice Barrett	630	24.7	
Conservative	Leslie Jones	547		
Conservative	Paul Morgan	502		
Labour	Mark Dempsey	337	13.2	
Labour	Garry Mills	282		
Labour	Steven Richards	240		
Turnout		3274		
Liberal Democrats win (new seat)				

=== Kingsholm and Wotton ===
Kingsholm and Wotton (2) 2002
Party	Candidate	Votes	%	±%
Liberal Democrats	Jeremy Hilton	786	42.7	
Liberal Democrats	Michael Power	687		
Conservative	Robert Moreland	638		
Conservative	Eric Ede	630	34.3	
Labour	Sarah Everett	340	18.5	
Labour	Susan Hitchings	320		
CPA	Jonathan Ingleby	83	4.5	
Turnout		1958		
Liberal Democrats hold		Swing		

=== Longlevens ===
Longlevens (3) 2002
Party	Candidate	Votes	%	±%
Conservative	Paul James	1,511	48.1	
Conservative	Philip Beer	1,465		
Conservative	Mark Hawthorne	1,367		
Liberal Democrats	Veronica Phillips	1246	39.6	
Liberal Democrats	Thomas Croucher	1118		
Liberal Democrats	Malcolm Higgins	1001		
Labour	Mary Cooke	386	12.3	
Labour	David Cosstick	329		
Conservative	Jeremy Fisher	307		
Turnout				
Conservative hold		Swing		

=== Matson and Robinswood ===
Matson and Robinswood (3) 2002
Party	Candidate	Votes	%	±%
Labour	Stephen McHale	842	51.4	
Labour	Mary Smith	792		
Labour	Kevin Stephens	776		
Conservative	Eleanor Browning	570	34.8	
Conservative	Duncan Hall	559		
Conservative	Linda Morgan	535		
UKIP	Alexis Fernandes	225	13.7	
Turnout				
Labour hold		Swing		

=== Moreland ===
Moreland (3) 2002
Party	Candidate	Votes	%	±%
Labour	Nicholas Durrant	896	56.5	
Labour	Mark Hobbs	884		
Labour	Geraldene Gillespie	838		
Conservative	Royston Beckett	690	43.5	
Conservative	Susan Gordon	560		
Conservative	Terence King	533		
Turnout				
Labour hold		Swing		

=== Podsmead ===
Podsmead (1) 2002
Party	Candidate	Votes	%	±%
Labour	Michael Lawlor	375	67.7	
Conservative	Peter Robinson	179	32.3	
Turnout				
Labour hold		Swing		

=== Quedgeley Fieldcourt ===
Quedgeley Fieldcourt (2) 2002
Party	Candidate	Votes	%	±%
Conservative	Jacqueline Hall	520	43.4	
Conservative	Susan Lewis	449		
Liberal Democrats	Julian Powell	308	25.7	
Liberal Democrats	Anna Mozol	290		
Labour	Redvers Thomas	267	22.3	
Labour	Allan Trigg	216		
Independent	Jean Hanks	103	8.6	
Turnout				
Conservative hold		Swing		

=== Quedgeley Severn Vale ===
Quedgeley Severn Vale (2) 2002
Party	Candidate	Votes	%	±%
Conservative	Andrew Lewis	676	67.1	
Conservative	Martyn White	613		
Labour	Stephen Hoddy	331	32.9	
Labour	David Purchase	270		
Turnout				
Conservative hold		Swing		

=== Tuffley ===
Tuffley (2) 2002
Party	Candidate	Votes	%	±%
Conservative	Brian Crawford	675	50.2	
Labour	Janet Lugg	670	49.8	
Labour	Rosalind Onians	649		
Conservative	Anne Suddards-Moss	612		
Turnout				
Conservative hold		Swing		

=== Westgate ===
Westgate (2) 2002
Party	Candidate	Votes	%	±%
Conservative	Pamela Tracey	632	49.1	
Conservative	Stephen Morgan	563		
Liberal Democrats	Gordon Heath	479	37.2	
Liberal Democrats	Andrew Meads	386		
Labour	Terry Barrett	177	13.7	
Labour	Evan Garwood	170		
Turnout				
Conservative hold		Swing		
