= 2011 Gloucester City Council election =

UK local election

- 5 May 2011

11 seats of 36 on council 19 seats needed for a majority
	First party	Second party	Third party
Leader	Paul James
Party	Conservative	Labour	Liberal Democrats
Seats before	17	8	11
Seats after	19	7	10
Seat change	▲2	▼1	▼1
- Results of the 2011 Gloucester City Council election

The 2011 Gloucester City Council election took place on 5 May 2011 to elect members of Gloucester City Council in England. There were 11 seats for election and the Conservative Party gained control of the council from no overall control. Paul James, who had been serving as leader of the council since 2007 running a Conservative minority administration, continued to serve as leader but with his party having a majority.

== Results ==
Gloucester City Council election, 2011
Party	Seats	Gains	Losses	Net gain/loss	Seats %	Votes %	Votes	+/−
Conservative	6	3	1	+2		41%		
Labour	2		1	-1		29%		
Liberal Democrats	3	1	2	-1		24%		
UKIP	0					3%		
Green	2					0%		
TUSC	0					1%		

== Ward results ==
=== Abbey ===
Abbey 2011
Party	Candidate	Votes	%	±%
Conservative	Norman John Ravenhill	1,755	55%	
Labour	Emily Ann Barrett	977	29%	
Liberal Democrats	Tom Partington	270	8%	
UKIP	Danny Sparkes	247	8%	
Turnout		3189		
Conservative hold		Swing		

=== Barnwood ===
Barnwood 2011
Party	Candidate	Votes	%	±%
Conservative	Tarren Randle	1,086	34	
Liberal Democrats	Verona Vidal	1,059	33	
Labour	Cilla Woodman	718	23	
UKIP	Mike Smith	209	7	
TUSC	Phil Jordan	115	4	
Turnout		3,187		
Conservative gain from Liberal Democrats		Swing		

=== Barton and Tredworth ===
Barton and Tredworth 2011
Party	Candidate	Votes	%	±%
Conservative	Sajid Patel	1,229	44	
Labour	Harjit Gill	1,061	38	
Liberal Democrats	Abdul Haq Pandor	299	11	
TUSC	John Henry Ewers	190	7	
Turnout		2,779		
Conservative gain from Labour		Swing		

=== Hucclecote ===
Hucclecote 2011
Party	Candidate	Votes	%	±%
Liberal Democrats	Declan Wilson	1,854	57	
Conservative	John Clarence Lock	756	33.4	
Labour	James Andrew Hoddy	479	15	
Turnout		3,274		
Liberal Democrats hold		Swing		

=== Kingsholm and Wotton ===
Kingsholm and Wotton 2011
Party	Candidate	Votes	%	±%
Liberal Democrats	Sebastian Richard Seymour Field	785	40	
Labour	David Hitchings	487	25	
Conservative	Matthew Mark Stevens	481	25	
Green	Jonathan Cecil Ingleby	108	6	
UKIP	Daryl Phillip Stanbury	97	5	
Turnout		1,958		
Liberal Democrats hold		Swing		

=== Longlevens ===
Longlevens 2011
Party	Candidate	Votes	%	±%
Conservative	Kathy Williams	2,005	57	
Liberal Democrats	Di Docksey	821	23	
Labour	Danny King	695	20	
Turnout		3521		
Conservative hold		Swing		

=== Matson and Robinswood ===
Matson and Robinswood 2011
Party	Candidate	Votes	%	±%
Labour	Kate Haigh	767	51	
Conservative	Rebecca Lianne Byczok	885	34	
UKIP	Richard John Edwards	235	9	
Liberal Democrats	Mike Anderton	181	7	
Turnout		2636		
Labour hold		Swing		

=== Moreland ===
Moreland 2011
Party	Candidate	Votes	%	±%
Labour	Matthew William Gilson	1,243	48	
Conservative	Lyn Ackroyd	990	38	
Green	Matthew John Sidford	214	8	
Liberal Democrats	Stephen John Power	154	6	
Turnout		2601		
Labour hold		Swing		

=== Quedgeley Fieldcourt ===
Quedgeley Fieldcourt 2011
Party	Candidate	Votes	%	±%
Conservative	Deb Llewellyn	1,095	49	
Labour	Barry Peter Kirby	777	35	
Liberal Democrats	David Robert Southgate	240	11	
Green	Charley Bircher	120	5	
Turnout		2232		
Conservative hold		Swing		

=== Quedgeley Severn Vale ===
Quedgeley Severn Vale 2011
Party	Candidate	Votes	%	±%
Liberal Democrats	Anna Mozol	750	40	
Conservative	Martyn White	670	35	
Labour	Christopher Harry Chatterton	477	25	
Turnout		1897		
Liberal Democrats gain from Conservative		Swing		

=== Westgate ===
Westgate 2011
Party	Candidate	Votes	%	±%
Conservative	Paul Geoffrey Toleman	774	45	
Liberal Democrats	Kelsa Jayne Rowlands-Evans	492	29	
Labour	Garry Mills	342	20	
Green	Eva Langrock-Bircher	94	6	
Turnout		1702		
Conservative gain from Liberal Democrats		Swing		
