= 2016 Gloucester City Council election =

UK local election

- 5 May 2016

All 39 seats to Gloucester City Council 20 seats needed for a majority
| | First party | Second party | Third party |
|---|---|---|---|
| | Con | Lab | Lib |
| Party | Conservative | Labour | Liberal Democrats |
| Last election | 20 seats, 42% | 8 seats, 26% | 8 seats, 15% |
| Seats won | 22 | 10 | 7 |
| Seat change | ▲2 | ▲2 | ▼1 |
| Popular vote | 27,081 | 16,303 | 9,907 |
| Percentage | 45.0% | 27.1% | 16.5% |
| Swing | ▲3.5% | ▼1.8% | ▲2.2% |
- Results of the 2016 Gloucester City Council election
Council control before election
Conservative
Council control after election
Conservative

The 2016 Gloucester City Council election took place on 5 May 2016 to elect members of Gloucester City Council in England. All seats are up for election at the same time due to boundary changes. This was on the same day as other local elections. The council also changed from electing a third of the council to electing the entire council. They were originally planned for 7 May 2020, but postponed until 6 May 2021 due to the COVID-19 pandemic.

== Results ==
Gloucester City Council election, 2016
| Party | Seats | Gains | Losses | Net gain/loss | Seats % | Votes % | Votes | +/− |
|---|---|---|---|---|---|---|---|---|
| Conservative | 22 | | | +2 | 54 | 45.0 | 27,081 | +3.5 |
| Labour | 10 | | | +2 | 29 | 27.1 | 16,303 | +1.8 |
| Liberal Democrats | 7 | | | -1 | 17 | 16.5 | 9,907 | +2.2 |
| UKIP | 0 | | | - | 0 | 5.4 | 3,230 | -9.0 |
| Green | 0 | | | - | 0 | 5.1 | 3,057 | +0.8 |
| Other parties | 0 | | | - | 0 | 1 | | |

== Ward results ==
=== Abbeydale ===
Abbeydale 2016
| Party | Candidate | Votes | % | ±% |
|---|---|---|---|---|
| Conservative | Andrew Gravells | 1,138 | 58.5 | |
| Conservative | Collette Jane Finnegan | 881 | 45.3 | |
| Labour | Steve Lugg | 357 | 18.4 | |
| UKIP | Danny Sparkes | 349 | 18.0 | |
| Labour | Maisie Rose Sanders | 331 | 17.0 | |
| Independent | David Harber | 285 | 14.7 | |
| Liberal Democrats | Patrick James Wilson | 149 | 7.7 | |
| Green | Emily Ann Hoddy | 103 | 5.3 | |
| Turnout | | 1,944 | 37.2 | |
| Conservative win (new seat) | | | | |
| Conservative win (new seat) | | | | |

=== Abbeymead ===
Abbeymead 2016
| Party | Candidate | Votes | % | ±% |
|---|---|---|---|---|
| Conservative | Laura Pearsall | 862 | 57.1 | |
| Conservative | Gordon Taylor | 709 | 47.0 | |
| Liberal Democrats | Jonathan Michael Whittaker | 376 | 24.9 | |
| Liberal Democrats | Abigail Wilson | 335 | 22.2 | |
| Labour | Tony Hodges | 249 | 16.5 | |
| Green | Michael Richardson | 164 | 10.9 | |
| Turnout | | 1,510 | 32.1 | |
| Conservative hold | | Swing | | |
| Conservative hold | | Swing | | |

=== Barnwood ===
Barnwood 2016
| Party | Candidate | Votes | % | ±% |
|---|---|---|---|---|
| Conservative | Lise Noakes | 875 | 43.8 | |
| Liberal Democrats | Joanne Marie Brown | 685 | 34.3 | |
| Conservative | Judi Brown | 681 | 34.1 | |
| Liberal Democrats | Jess Palmer | 594 | 29.7 | |
| UKIP | Stephen Leslie Pottage | 254 | 12.7 | |
| Labour | Cilla Woodman | 247 | 12.5 | |
| Labour | Trevor Duncan Howard | 223 | 11.2 | |
| Green | Brendan Mark Baker | 117 | 5.9 | |
| Turnout | | 1,998 | 40.5 | |
| Conservative hold | | Swing | | |
| Liberal Democrats hold | | Swing | | |

=== Barton and Tredworth ===
Barton and Tredworth 2016
| Party | Candidate | Votes | % | ±% |
|---|---|---|---|---|
| Labour | Usman Bhaimia | 1,231 | 51.8 | |
| Labour | Said Hansdot | 1,121 | 47.2 | |
| Conservative | Sajid Patel | 1,113 | 46.8 | |
| Labour | Garry Mills | 794 | 33.4 | |
| Conservative | Rashid Farooq | 630 | 26.4 | |
| Conservative | Dan Woolf | 580 | 24.4 | |
| UKIP | Kamila Pawlowicz | 250 | 10.5 | |
| Green | Charley Bircher | 179 | 7.5 | |
| Green | Gareth Huw John | 175 | 7.4 | |
| Liberal Democrats | Paul Harries | 136 | 5.7 | |
| TUSC | Katy Bailey | 116 | 4.9 | |
| TUSC | Sue Powell | 77 | 3.2 | |
| TUSC | Richard Price | 47 | 2.0 | |
| Turnout | | 2,377 | 33.7 | |
| Conservative hold | | Swing | | |
| Labour hold | | Swing | | |
| Labour hold | | Swing | | |

=== Coney Hill ===
Coney Hill 2016
| Party | Candidate | Votes | % | ±% |
|---|---|---|---|---|
| Labour | Lauren Marie Fearn | 266 | 37.2 | |
| Liberal Democrats | Philip Stuart McLellan | 218 | 30.4 | |
| Conservative | Tarren Anne Randle | 133 | 18.6 | |
| UKIP | Philip Anthony William Nash | 99 | 13.8 | |
| Turnout | | 716 | 28.0 | |
| Labour win (new seat) | | | | |

=== Elmbridge ===
Elmbridge 2016
| Party | Candidate | Votes | % | ±% |
|---|---|---|---|---|
| Liberal Democrats | Emily Sarah Trevithick Ryall | 918 | 48.0 | |
| Liberal Democrats | Howard Hyman | 734 | 38.4 | |
| Conservative | Justin Oliver Hudson | 517 | 27.0 | |
| Conservative | Shane Aaron Hopkins | 476 | 24.9 | |
| Labour | Roger John Martin | 344 | 18.0 | |
| UKIP | Bob Mace | 251 | 13.1 | |
| Green | Frances Joan Griffiths | 141 | 7.4 | |
| Green | Jonathan Cecil Ingleby | 82 | 4.3 | |
| Turnout | | 1,912 | 39.3 | |
| Liberal Democrats hold | | Swing | | |
| Liberal Democrats hold | | Swing | | |

=== Grange ===
Grange 2016
| Party | Candidate | Votes | % | ±% |
|---|---|---|---|---|
| Conservative | Nigel Joseph Hanman | 893 | 51.3 | |
| Conservative | Steve Morgan | 743 | 42.7 | |
| Labour | Daryl Baldwin | 626 | 35.9 | |
| Labour | Mat McCall | 425 | 24.4 | |
| UKIP | Rosemarie Jean Marchmont | 392 | 22.5 | |
| Turnout | | 1,742 | 33.8 | |
| Conservative hold | | Swing | | |
| Conservative hold | | Swing | | |

=== Hucclecote ===
Hucclecote 2016
| Party | Candidate | Votes | % | ±% |
|---|---|---|---|---|
| Liberal Democrats | David John Brown | 1,286 | 56.8 | |
| Liberal Democrats | Declan Wilson | 1,104 | 48.7 | |
| Conservative | Chris Etheridge | 756 | 33.4 | |
| Conservative | Lee James Dopson | 532 | 23.5 | |
| Labour | Kay Frances Mills | 324 | 14.3 | |
| Green | Henry Thomas Jones | 151 | 6.7 | |
| Turnout | | 2,265 | 44.6 | |
| Liberal Democrats win (new seat) | | | | |
| Liberal Democrats win (new seat) | | | | |

=== Kingsholm and Wotton ===
Kingsholm and Wotton 2016
| Party | Candidate | Votes | % | ±% |
|---|---|---|---|---|
| Liberal Democrats | Jeremy Eric Hilton | 775 | 50.0 | |
| Liberal Democrats | Isabel Mellonie Brazil | 641 | 41.4 | |
| Labour | Jonathan Richard Hoad | 331 | 21.4 | |
| Conservative | Tim Justice | 310 | 20.0 | |
| Conservative | Matthew David Francis | 276 | 17.8 | |
| Labour | Paul Michael Thompson | 275 | 17.7 | |
| UKIP | James Alexander | 174 | 11.2 | |
| Green | Mairi Mills | 130 | 8.4 | |
| Turnout | | 1,550 | 33.4 | |
| Liberal Democrats hold | | Swing | | |
| Liberal Democrats hold | | Swing | | |

=== Kingsway ===
Kingsway 2016
| Party | Candidate | Votes | % | ±% |
|---|---|---|---|---|
| Conservative | Richard Lawrence Cook | 470 | 52.2 | |
| Conservative | Jennie Rotheva Dallimore | 464 | 51.6 | |
| Labour | Emma Jane Ford | 340 | 37.8 | |
| Green | Chloe French | 282 | 31.3 | |
| Turnout | | 900 | 23.3 | |
| Conservative win (new seat) | | | | |
| Conservative win (new seat) | | | | |

=== Longlevens ===
Longlevens 2016
| Party | Candidate | Votes | % | ±% |
|---|---|---|---|---|
| Conservative | Kathy Williams | 1,657 | 57.3 | |
| Conservative | Paul Simon James | 1,636 | 56.6 | |
| Conservative | Jim Porter | 1,410 | 48.7 | |
| Labour | Terry Haines | 696 | 24.1 | |
| UKIP | Susannah Collier | 541 | 18.7 | |
| Liberal Democrats | Paul Harris | 515 | 17.8 | |
| Green | Christopher David Britton | 494 | 17.1 | |
| Turnout | | 2,893 | 39.4 | |
| Conservative hold | | Swing | | |
| Conservative hold | | Swing | | |
| Conservative hold | | Swing | | |

=== Matson and Robinswood ===
Matson and Robinswood 2016
| Party | Candidate | Votes | % | ±% |
|---|---|---|---|---|
| Labour | Tom Coole | 822 | 46.8 | |
| Labour | Kate Haigh | 767 | 43.4 | |
| Labour | Jan Lugg | 713 | 40.4 | |
| UKIP | Gary Frederick Cleaver | 521 | 29.5 | |
| Conservative | Norman John Ravenhill | 492 | 27.8 | |
| Conservative | Simon John Griffiths | 368 | 20.9 | |
| Conservative | Duncan Hall | 353 | 20.1 | |
| Green | Ros Durrant | 272 | 15.5 | |
| Turnout | | 1,757 | 26.8 | |
| Labour hold | | Swing | | |
| Labour hold | | Swing | | |
| Labour hold | | Swing | | |

=== Moreland ===
Moreland 2016
| Party | Candidate | Votes | % | ±% |
|---|---|---|---|---|
| Labour | Neil Hampson | 1,080 | 50.1 | |
| Labour | Kevin Ernest Stephens | 879 | 40.8 | |
| Labour | Terry Pullen | 872 | 40.4 | |
| Conservative | Lyn Ackroyd | 860 | 39.9 | |
| Conservative | Peter Denzil Corry | 507 | 23.5 | |
| Conservative | Jane Elizabeth White | 462 | 21.4 | |
| UKIP | Simon Collins | 405 | 18.8 | |
| Green | Matthew John Sidford | 375 | 17.4 | |
| Turnout | | 2,156 | 31.0 | |
| Labour hold | | Swing | | |
| Labour hold | | Swing | | |
| Labour hold | | Swing | | |

=== Podsmead ===
Podsmead 2016
| Party | Candidate | Votes | % | ±% |
|---|---|---|---|---|
| Labour | Deborah Ann Smith | 372 | 52.0 | |
| Conservative | Andrew Gilbert Miller | 344 | 48.0 | |
| Turnout | | 716 | 32.9 | |
| Labour win (new seat) | | | | |

=== Quedgeley Fieldcourt ===
Quedgeley Fieldcourt 2016
| Party | Candidate | Votes | % | ±% |
|---|---|---|---|---|
| Conservative | David Foley Norman | 631 | 48.0 | |
| Conservative | Lee Hawthorne | 578 | 44.0 | |
| Labour | Jan Garbutt | 351 | 26.7 | |
| Labour | Ken Garbutt | 336 | 25.6 | |
| Liberal Democrats | Gordon Heath | 149 | 11.3 | |
| Turnout | | 1,315 | 28.9 | |
| Conservative hold | | Swing | | |
| Conservative hold | | Swing | | |

=== Quedgeley Severn Vale ===
Quedgeley Severn Vale 2016
| Party | Candidate | Votes | % | ±% |
|---|---|---|---|---|
| Conservative | Andy Lewis | 582 | 44.0 | |
| Conservative | Hannah Norman | 462 | 34.9 | |
| Liberal Democrats | Anna Mozol | 446 | 33.7 | |
| Labour | Mervyn John Hyde | 303 | 22.9 | |
| Liberal Democrats | Helen Susan Powell | 245 | 18.5 | |
| UKIP | Miles Stacey | 239 | 18.1 | |
| Turnout | | 1,324 | 28.8 | |
| Conservative hold | | Swing | | |
| Conservative hold | | Swing | | |

=== Tuffley ===
Tuffley 2016
| Party | Candidate | Votes | % | ±% |
|---|---|---|---|---|
| Conservative | Gerald Charles Dee | 670 | 39.2 | |
| Conservative | Colin Adrian Organ | 652 | 38.2 | |
| Labour | Tracy Sharon Millard | 486 | 28.6 | |
| Labour | Sadia Hameed | 366 | 21.5 | |
| UKIP | Daryl Phillip Stanbury | 276 | 16.2 | |
| Green | Eva-Marie Caroline Langrock-Bircher | 116 | 6.8 | |
| Turnout | | 1,708 | 38.6 | |
| Conservative hold | | Swing | | |
| Conservative hold | | Swing | | |

=== Westgate ===
Westgate 2016
| Party | Candidate | Votes | % | ±% |
|---|---|---|---|---|
| Conservative | Pam Tracey | 905 | 58.7 | |
| Conservative | Paul Geoffrey Toleman | 765 | 49.6 | |
| Conservative | Dawn Melvin | 679 | 44.1 | |
| Labour | Gabrielle Hilary Hampson | 406 | 26.3 | |
| Labour | Mark Alastair Wallace | 370 | 24.0 | |
| Green | Mariana Straton | 276 | 17.9 | |
| Liberal Democrats | Matthew John Keighley | 210 | 13.6 | |
| Liberal Democrats | Imogen Alice Caterer | 205 | 13.3 | |
| Liberal Democrats | Sarah Lucy Dobson | 186 | 12.1 | |
| TUSC | John Ewers | 114 | 7.4 | |
| Turnout | | 1,541 | 29.1 | |
| Conservative hold | | Swing | | |
| Conservative hold | | Swing | | |
| Conservative hold | | Swing | | |

== By-Elections ==
=== Longlevens ===
A by-election was held in Longlevens ward on 3 November 2016, following the death of Jim Porter.

Longlevens 2016
| Party | Candidate | Votes | % | ±% |
|---|---|---|---|---|
| Conservative | Clive Walford | 1,066 | 46.2 | −2.5 |
| Liberal Democrats | Linda Susan Castle | 852 | 36.9 | +19.1 |
| Labour | Terry Haines | 223 | 9.7 | −14.4 |
| UKIP | Daniel Joseph Woolf | 167 | 7.2 | −11.5 |
| Turnout | | 2,311 | 31 | |
| Conservative hold | | Swing | | |

=== Barnwood ===
A by-election was held in Barnwood ward on 25 July 2019

Barnwood 2019
| Party | Candidate | Votes | % | ±% |
|---|---|---|---|---|
| Liberal Democrats | Ashley Bowkett | 676 | 46.5 | +15.1 |
| Conservative | Fred Ramsey | 496 | 34.1 | −6.0 |
| Brexit Party | Peter Sheehy | 152 | 10.5 | new |
| Labour | Chris Clee | 64 | 4.4 | −6.9 |
| Green | Jonathan Ingleby | 59 | 4.1 | −1.3 |
| UKIP | Matthew Young | 6 | 0.4 | −11.2 |
| Turnout | | 1,453 | 29 | |
| Liberal Democrats gain from Conservative | | Swing | +10.55 | |

=== Podsmead ===
A by-election was held in Podsmead ward on 25 July 2019

Podsmead 2019
| Party | Candidate | Votes | % | ±% |
|---|---|---|---|---|
| Liberal Democrats | Sebastian Field | 203 | 30.0 | new |
| Conservative | Byron Davis | 200 | 29.6 | −18.5 |
| Labour | Lisa Jevins | 122 | 18.0 | −33.9 |
| Brexit Party | Rob McCormick | 111 | 16.4 | new |
| Green | Michael Byfield | 29 | 4.3 | new |
| UKIP | Simon Collins | 11 | 1.6 | new |
| Turnout | | 676 | 33 | |
| Liberal Democrats gain from Labour | | Swing | | |
