= List of lightvessels of Great Britain =

This is a list of lightvessels which operate or operated on various lightvessel stations in England, Scotland and Wales.

== Trinity House lightvessels ==
The central records of the lightvessels operated by Trinity House were lost when Trinity House was bombed in 1940.

Name	LV number	Image	Entered service	Shipbuilder & yard no.	Stations served on	Decommissioned	Notes
Mary Mouse 2	1		1946	Philip and Son		1993	In 1993 she was decommissioned and sold to Dean & Reddyhoff Ltd., Southampton, for use as marina club house at Gosport, Hampshire.
Light vessel no. 3	3		1947	Philip and Son	Varne (from 1981), Channel, Outer Gabbard, Kentish Knock, Owers		Sank off the coast of Israel in 2000.
Scarweather	4		1947	Philip and Son		1989	In 1991 was sold to the Musée de Bateau in Douarnenez, France, for £40,000. She has been restored and renamed "Scarweather".
Light vessel no. 5	5		1947	Philip and Son	Greenwich, South Goodwin (1961), Tongue (1973), Falls (from 1973 until 1976), Varne (1977)		She was deployed as relief lightship to replace vessels undergoing refit or otherwise out of commission. She served on many stations; her last was the South Goodwin, before being withdrawn from service for conversion to unmanned operation.
Jenni Baynton	8		1949	Philip and Son	Kentish Knock (from 1949 until 1953), Outer Gabbard (from 1962 until 1965), Tongue	1991	In 2005 Radio Waddenzee bought the lightship and towed it from Rotterdam to Harlingen, Netherlands, where she is used as a radio station.
Breeveertien	11		1951	Philip and Son; 1223	Morecambe Bay, St Gowan	21 Oct 1988	Saved from scrap and towed to the repair yard in the Waalhaven in Rotterdam, Netherlands. Rebuilt into a maritime restaurant.
Feuerschiff	13		1952	Philip and Son		10 Mar 1989	Transferred to Hamburg in 1991, where she was used as a restaurant and hotel.
Lightship 2000	14		27 Nov 1953	Philip and Son; 1246		1991	Opened in 2000 in Cardiff as a church ship; removed from Cardiff docks on financial grounds on 18 May 2015 and towed to Sharpness for drydocking and refurbishment. The press had stated that it was to become a floating museum at Newnham in Gloucestershire and was reported as being seen there in August 2016.
Trinity	15		1954	Philip and Son	Morecambe Bay, Scarweather, Channel, St Gowan, Helwick, Dudgeon, Breaksea	1987	Now used by a church charity Fellowship Afloat at the mouth of the River Blackwater at Tollesbury in Essex.
TS Colne Light	16		1954	Philip and Son		1988	Currently serves as the Sea Cadets training ship TS Colne Light moored at the Hythe Quay in Colchester.
LV17	17		1954		Foxtrot 3 (2006), South Goodwin		
Lightvessel 18	18			Philip and Son		1997	Used by pirate radio nostalgia stations (RSLs & BBC Essex) from 1999 to 2007, and in 2011 was restored and opened to the public at Harwich. From 2018 to present day she has been the home of Radio Mi Amigo pirate radio revivals.
Lightvessel no. 21	21		1963	Philip and Son	Varne (from 1980), East Goodwin	2008	On 28 June 1981 she was struck and heavily damaged by Ore Meteor under tow. Now in private ownership and has been converted into a floating art centre and performance venue. Currently moored at St Andrew's Quay, Gravesend, Kent.
Planet	23		1960	Philip and Son	Mersey Bar (from 1960 until 1972), Channel (1989)	1991	In 1989, when on the Channel station, was Trinity House's last manned lightvessel. In 1991 she became a museum ship in Birkenhead She was removed from Liverpool on 21 September 2016 and, in 2017, was the subject of an ownership dispute in Sharpness docks.
Gull Stream	38		1860		Brake (from 1930 until 1940), Lynn Well, Gull, Mouse (until 1941)	1941	Rammed and sunk on 18 March 1929 by the City of York, resulting in the death of Captain Williams of the lightship. In 1947 it was bought for £750 by Thurrock Yacht Club, and towed to Grays to become the club's headquarters. It was last used as a clubhouse in 1971. The Gull was then abandoned and now suffers from regular acts of vandalism and degradation through river action. It was scrapped at Grays in 2011.
Light vessel no. 44	44		1869	Charles Hill & Sons	Newarp	1945	Now lies derelict at Pitsea Country Park.
Tyne III	50		1879	Fletcher, Son and Fearnall	Sevenstones (from Sep 1879 until 1883), Shambles (from 1891 until 1909), Outer Gabbard (1911), Galloper (1929), Warner (1940), Calshot Spit (1943)	1952	Bought by the Royal Northumberland Yacht Club in 1952 for use as a clubhouse.
John Sebastian	55		1886	Charles Hill & Sons		1953	In service until springing a leak in 1953 and was towed to Barry Docks for repair. Later sold as a burnt-out wreck in 1954 to the Cabot Cruising Club in Bristol, located in Bathurst Basin.
East Oaze	60		8 Jul 1888	Robert Stephenson and Company; 7		1 Nov 1940	Sunk in an air raid in November 1940.
Light vessel no. 67	67						Now a wreck somewhere off the west coast of the British Isles.
Lightvessel no. 68	68				Haisborough, Operation Overlord		16 July to 11 November 1944 on "Kansas" station
Light vessel no. 69	69				South Goodwin (until Oct 1940)	21 Oct 1940	Destroyed by a mine on 21 October 1940 while on station at South Goodwin.
Light vessel no. 70	70		15 Dec 1902	John Crown & Sons Ltd; 109	Morecambe Bay (1903)	16 Jul 1903	Vessel lost due to a collision with Abbott on 16 July 1903.
Light Vessel 72	72		30 Mar 1903	John Crown & Sons Ltd; 111	English and Welsh Grounds, Juno Beach	1973	Saw service on D Day: carrying the name JUNO the ship marked a safe passage through a minefield for the landing craft en route to the invasion beaches. She was sold out of service in 1973 to Steel Supply Co., Neath for scrapping. She is now lying in poor condition, severely listing on a mud berth near the River Neath's Swing Bridge and does not float.
Light vessel no. 75	75		1906	Palmers Shipbuilding and Iron Company; 793	South Folkestone Gate, Varne	14 Aug 1940	Moved from Varne to South Folkestone Gate and sunk by Ju 87 Stuka dive bombers on 14 August 1940
Lightvessel no. 78	78		1914	John I. Thornycroft & Company	Calshot Spit		Formerly plinthed ashore at Ocean Village, in 2010 she was moved to Southampton Docks for a planned restoration. Moved to Solent Sky Museum in December 2019.
T.S. Orwell	80		1914	H & C Grayson	Sevenstones (from 1947 until 1958), St Gowan	1977	Last seen at Hoo St Werburgh in 2004.
LV83	83		1927	Caledon Shipbuilding & Engineering Company; 301	Newarp		Sank in 1967 after a collision, and lies at the bottom of the North Sea off Easington, Cleveland.
LV86	86		1931	J. Samuel White	Nore (from 1941 until 1942), Cork (from 1946 until 1962), Edinburgh Channel	1974	Now used as a houseboat at Hoo Marina in Kent.
Light vessel no. 87	87		1932	A. & J. Inglis; 914	East Goodwin, Outer Dowsing (from 1947)	1973	now belongs to the Haven Ports Yacht Club in Suffolk.
T.S. Lord Nelson	88		1936	Philip and Son	Cockle (from 1936), Cork	1977	Last seen in Rochester in 2004.
Light Vessel no. 89	89		19 Jun 1936	Philip and Son	Nore, Lynn Well	1974	Became a pub in Bristol, and was broken up in 1995.
Light vessel no. 90	90		25 Sep 1937	Philip and Son; 838	South Goodwin	27 Nov 1954	Sank in a storm in 1954 with the loss of all lives except one.
Helwick	91		1937	Philip and Son; 839	Humber (from 1937 until 1971), Helwick (from 1971 until 1977)	1977	Now an exhibit in the National Waterfront Museum in Swansea.
Light vessel no. 93	93		1939	Philip and Son; 848	East Goodwin (from 1947 until 1953), Galloper (from 1954 until 1974), Inner Dowsing (1998), Foxtrot 3 (from 2001)	2004	She is now in use as a photographic studio and location in London Docklands.
LV94	94		1939	Philip and Son	Morecambe Bay, Shipwash	1990	In 2008 it was moored in Amsterdam and hired out for events.
Light vessel no. 95	95		1939	Philip and Son	Inner Dowsing	2003	On 1 December 1966, on the Varne station, she unknowingly dragged anchor in a gale and was found to be 2 nautical miles (3.7 km) off-station; she was restored to her correct position on 3 December. Sold in 2004. In 2011 she was being used as a recording studio at Trinity Buoy Wharf in London.

== Other operators ==
Name	LV number	Image	Entered service	Shipbuilder	Stations served on	Decommissioned	Notes
Spurn	12		19 Jul 1927	Goole Shipbuilding and Repairing Company	Bull (from 1959)	Nov 1975	Former Humber Conservancy Board lightvessel. After being acquired by the Hull City Council, since 1987, she has become a museum vessel in Hull Marina.
Sula	14		1959	Cook, Welton & Gemmell; 937	Spurn (from 1959)	1985	Formerly operated by the Humber Conservancy Board. Moored at Gloucester Docks as floating holiday accommodation.
Light vessel no. 16	16		1840	William Pitcher	Calshot Spit, Inner Dowsing (1873)	1945	Oldest surviving wooden lightship; Built for Trinity House, positioned at the Spurn light station off Yorkshire until that station was taken over by the Humber Conservancy Board; she afterwards served at Calshot Spit, of Hampshire, and, from 1873, the Inner Dowsing sandbank off Lincolnshire.
Sevenstones Lightship (1841)			1 Sep 1841	Thames Ironworks and Shipbuilding Company	Sevenstones (from 1841 until 1879)	May 1879	The initial lightvessel was provided by Trinity House.
Outer Dowsing			18 Sep 1925	Armstrong Whitworth; 1009	Outer Dowsing		
Good Intent			1813		North West		
South Rock							
North Carr			1933	A. & J. Inglis; 921	North Carr (from 1933 until 1975)	1975	Operated by the Northern Lighthouse Board

== See also ==
- Media related to Lightships of the United Kingdom at Wikimedia Commons
- Lightvessel stations of Great Britain
