= North Warehouse =

Coordinates: 51°51′51″N 2°15′07″W

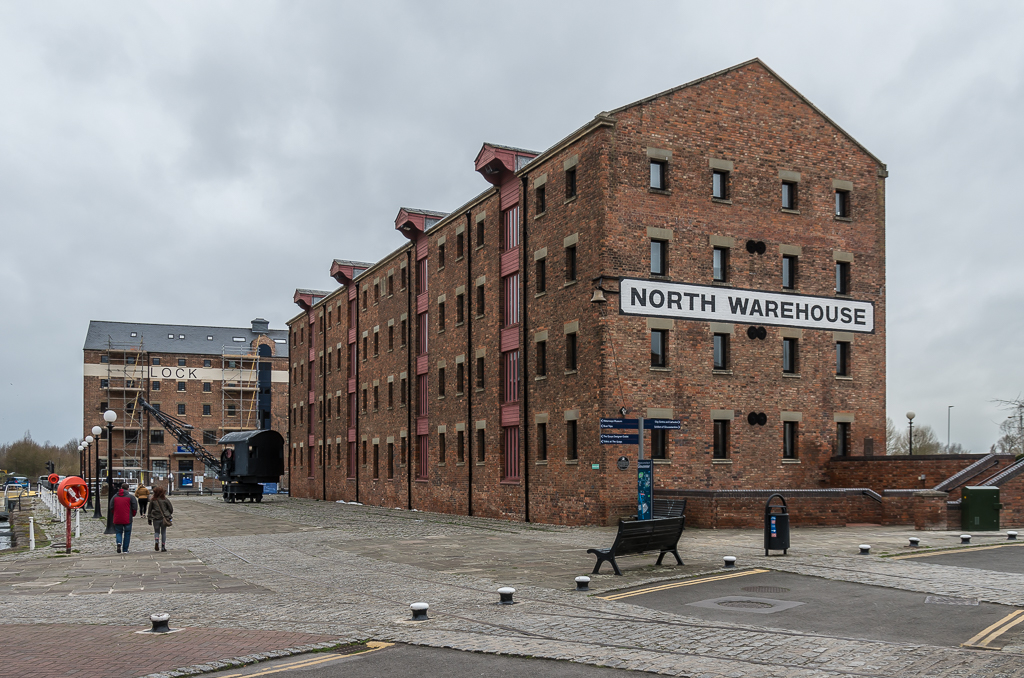
North Warehouse

North Warehouse is a British warehouse in the Gloucester Docks. Currently, it houses the Gloucester City Council.

== History ==
The warehouse began construction on 1826 and finished construction on 1827.

In 1985, Gloucester City Council acquired the building and it became the house of the council.
