= LV 14 Sula =

Coordinates: 51°51′36″N 2°15′19″W

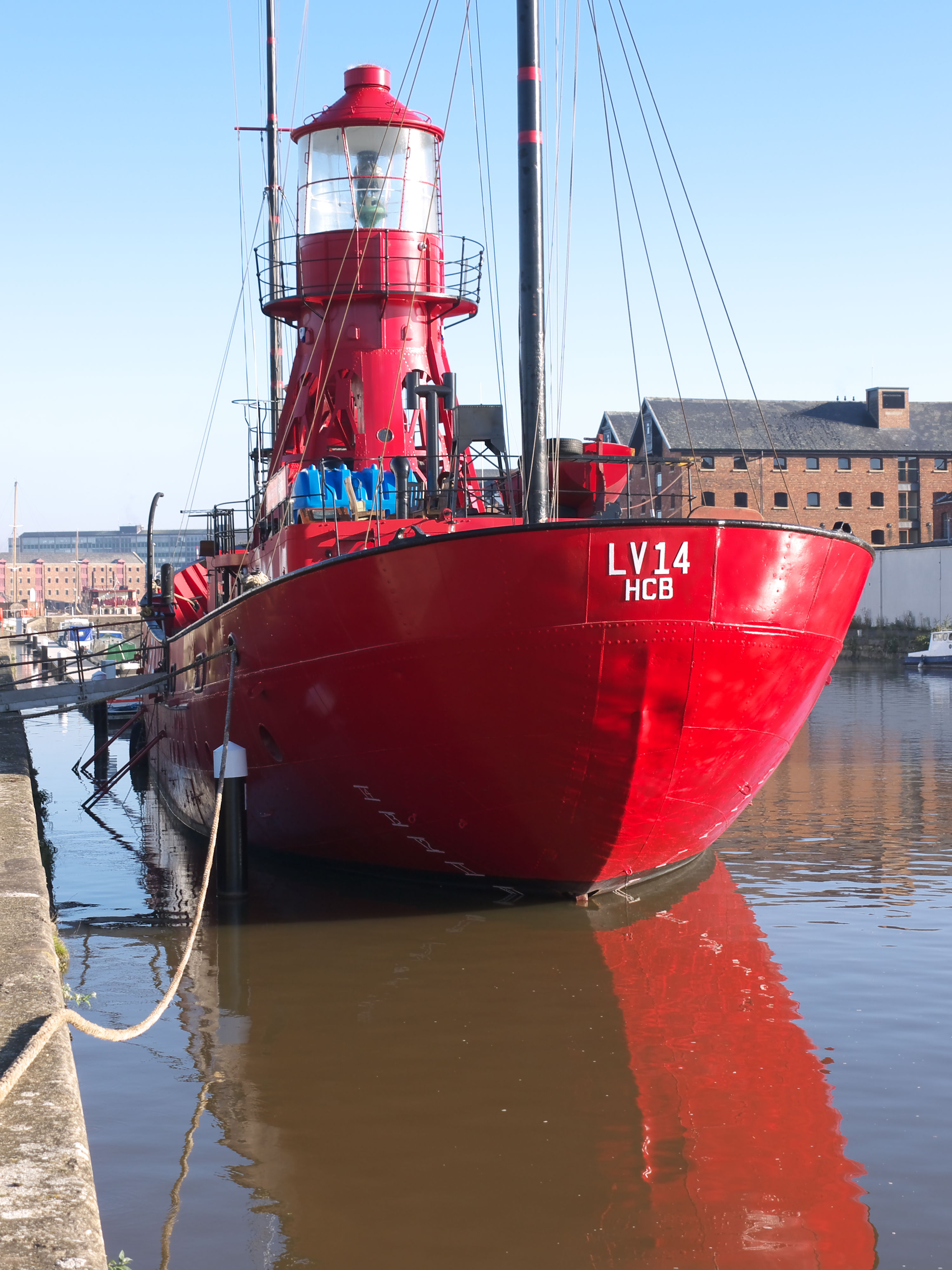
Sula in the Gloucester and Sharpness Canal

LV 14 Sula is a former Humber Conservancy Board lightvessel built in 1958 by Cook, Welton & Gemmell. Originally named SPURN, she was stationed on the Humber Estuary until decommissioning in 1985.

Since 2020 she has been privately owned and moored in Llanthony Wharf at Gloucester Docks to provide floating holiday accommodation under the name LV14 SULA.

LV 14 is on the National Historic Ships UK register as "Light Vessel 14 Sula".

In 2024, a debut documentary film by director Tim Veremieienko was released about the history of the ship and its owners, Colin and Vivienne Brooks. The film shows previously unseen parts of the vessel and introduces viewers to life onboard of the unique ship. The world premiere took place at the Gloucester Independent Film Festival at Gloucester Guildhall, and in March 2024 the film was first shown in Canada as part of the Living Skies festival. The film was warmly welcomed by public and received a number of nominations and awards on other festivals.

== See also ==
- Lightvessel stations of Great Britain
- List of lightvessels of Great Britain
