= Gloucester Tall Ships Festival =

Biannual festival

Tall Ship Festival
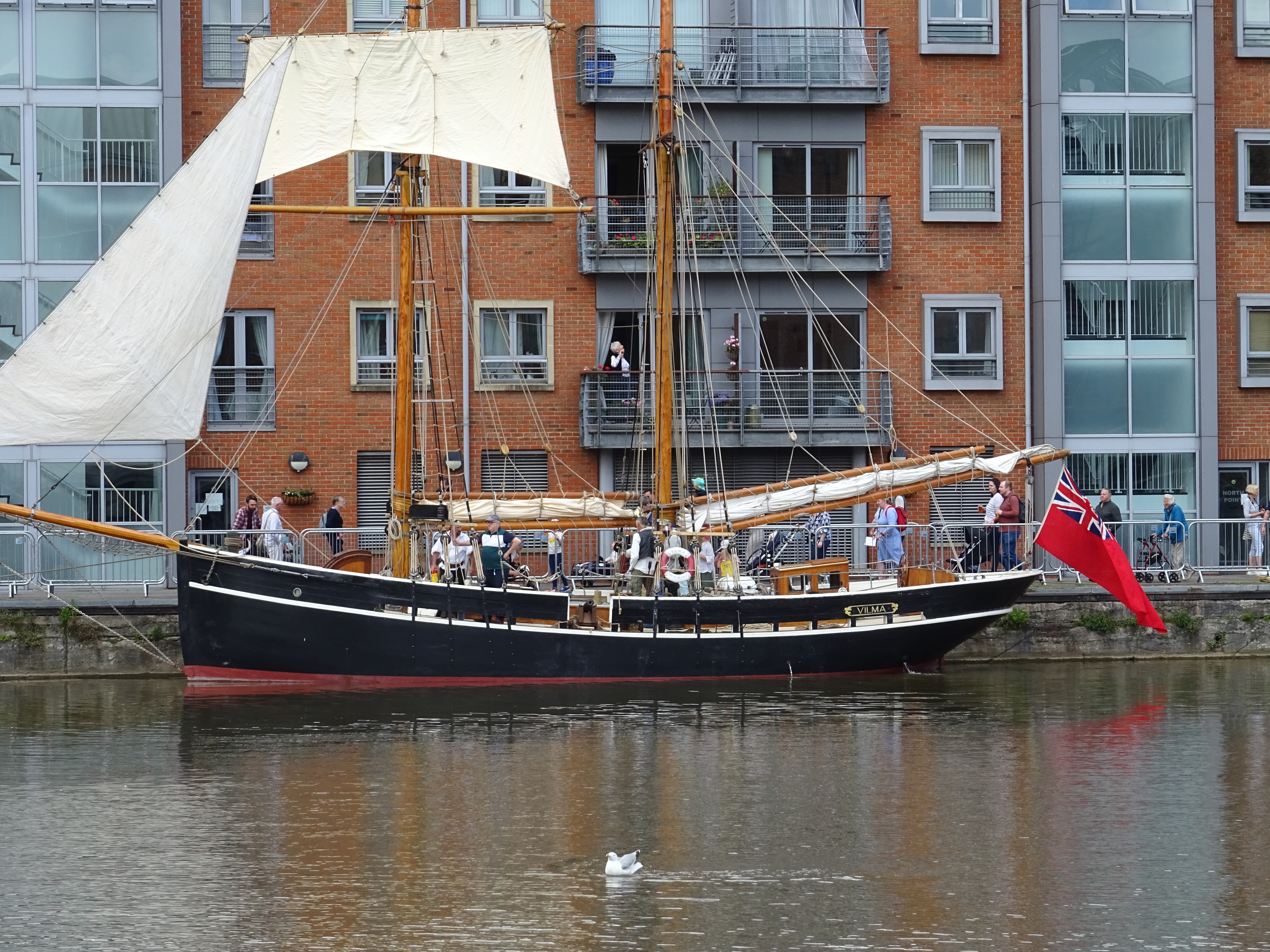
- Date: 25th May
- Duration: 2 days
- Location: Gloucester Docks; 51.8629722°N 2.2518368°W

The Gloucester Tall Ships Festival is a biannual festival which takes place at Gloucester Docks in Gloucestershire. In 2024, it took place from May 25 to May 27.

== History ==
In 2007, floods had hit the United Kingdom. Gloucester was one of the areas impacted by the floods. Gloucester decided to set up a festival, becoming known as the Gloucester Tall Ships Festival.
