= Ocean Village, Southampton =

Marina in Southamption, UK

Coordinates: 50.895°N 1.390°W

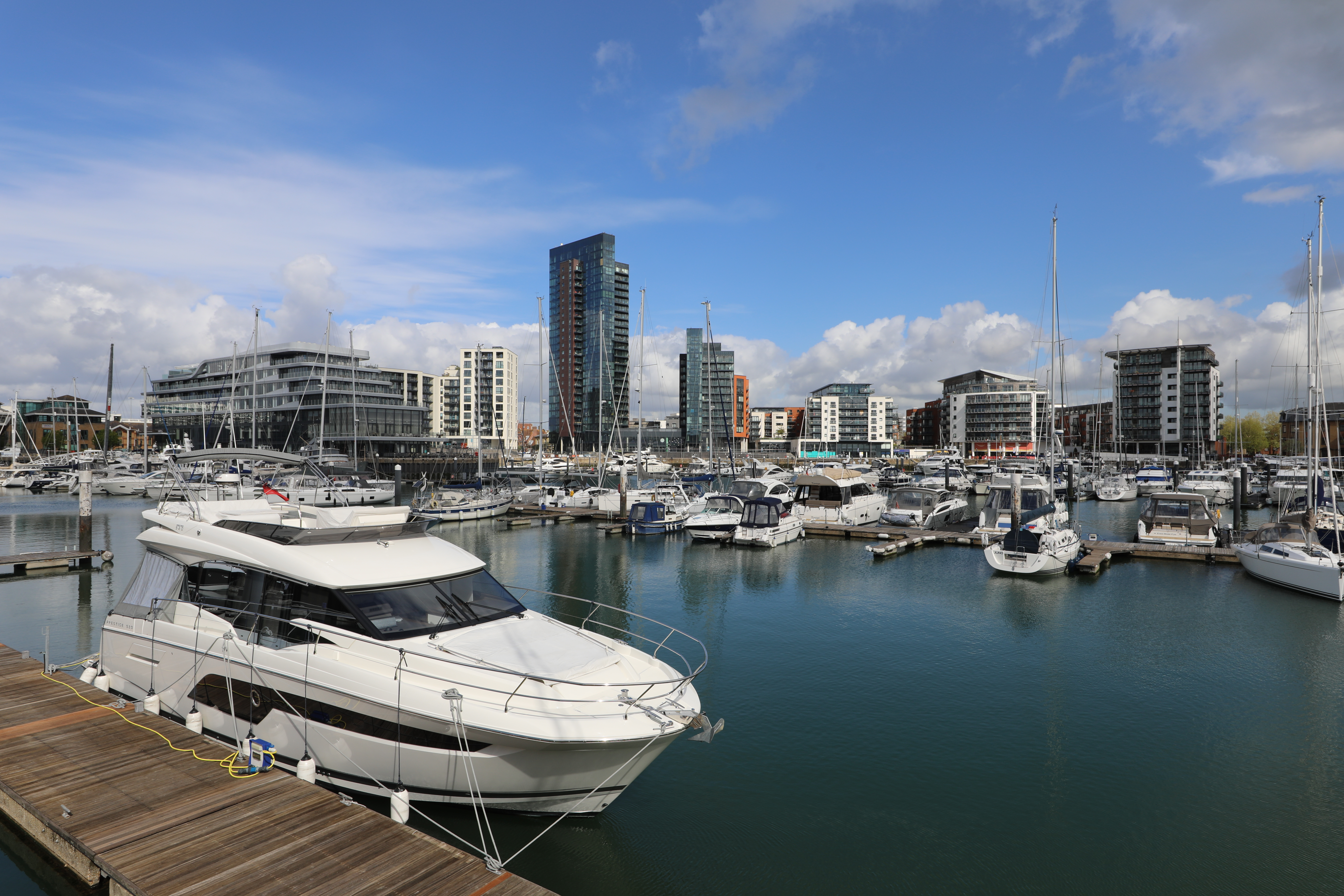
The Ocean Village marina

Ocean Village is a mixed-use marina, residential, business and leisure development on the mouth of the River Itchen in Southampton, on the south coast of England. Originally the site of Southampton's first working docks, the "Outer Dock" which opened in 1842, the area was redeveloped in 1986 and became the leisure marina it is today. After experiencing a period of stalled development with the late-2000s recession, Ocean Village underwent another series of major, multimillion-pound redevelopment projects. Current recreational facilities include a cinema, cafes, wine bars and restaurants.

The marina is managed and owned by Marina Developments Limited (MDL), a division of British-based Yattendon Investment Trust. The area, formerly used for commercial ships, offers 375 berths and the basin is deep enough to provide mooring facilities for tall ships and large yachts. The Global Challenge yacht races started from here in 1992, 1996 and 2000, and the Clipper Round the World Yacht Race set sail from here in 2011. Ocean Village was also the base for the Royal Southampton Yacht Club until 2018.

A number of companies have offices in the complex, including PricewaterhouseCoopers. The marina is home to the historical building, Enterprise House, which was originally a dock warehouse and has now been converted into serviced offices.

== History ==
In 1987 a £12 million shopping centre called Canute's Pavilion was opened. It struggled to attract tenants throughout its life and was demolished in 2008. The Royal Southampton Yacht Club moved its headquarters to Ocean Village in 1988.

In 2025 the residents of three of the tower blocks in ocean village were required to leave due to risks identified by fire safety surveys.

=== Calshot Spit lightship ===
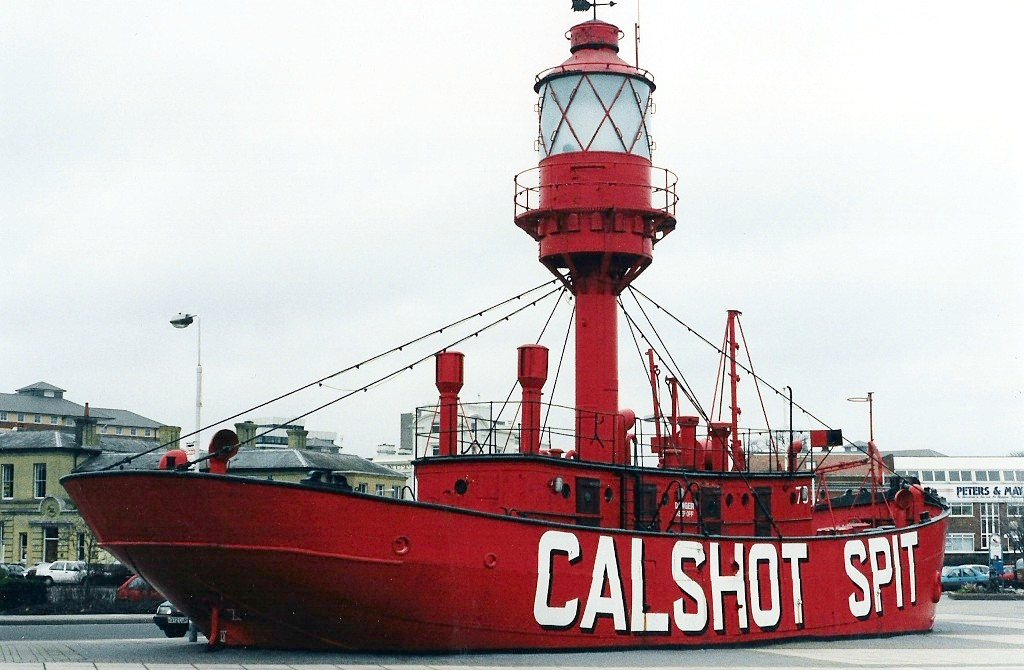
LV 78 Calshot Spit lightship

Between 1988 and 2010, the entrance to Ocean Village marina was the location for the former LV 78 Calshot Spit lightvessel, which formed a static attraction at the marina. This Trinity House navigation aid had guided ships entering Southampton Water from the western end of the Solent, coming around the low lying sand and shingle Calshot Spit. It is a lightship built in 1914 by J I Thornycroft shipyard in Southampton, and decommissioned in 1978. The lightship was removed on 3 November 2010 and taken to be restored at Trafalgar Graving Dock. The lightship was to become a "gateway attraction" at a new heritage museum called Aeronautica. The plans for Aeronautica came to a halt in January 2012. In December 2019 the Calshot Spit Lightship was transported to its new home at the Solent Sky museum.

== Current facilities ==
- Restaurants & Bars: Banana Wharf, Blue Jasmine, The King Canute, Bacaro, Casa Brasil, HarBAR on 6th, The Jetty and Maritimo Lounge.
- Cinema: Harbour Lights Picturehouse (including a fully licensed café-bar and patio). The original cinema was built between 1993 and 1994 to a design by Burrell Foley Fischer. It was extended to include a cafe between 1995 and 1997.
- Other Services: Harbour Hotel Southampton, Tesco Express, Co-op, Approved Boats, Argo Nautical, Leaders Southampton, Enfields, The Ocean Rooms Beauty Salon, Ocean Village Dental Clinic.

== Recent and planned developments ==
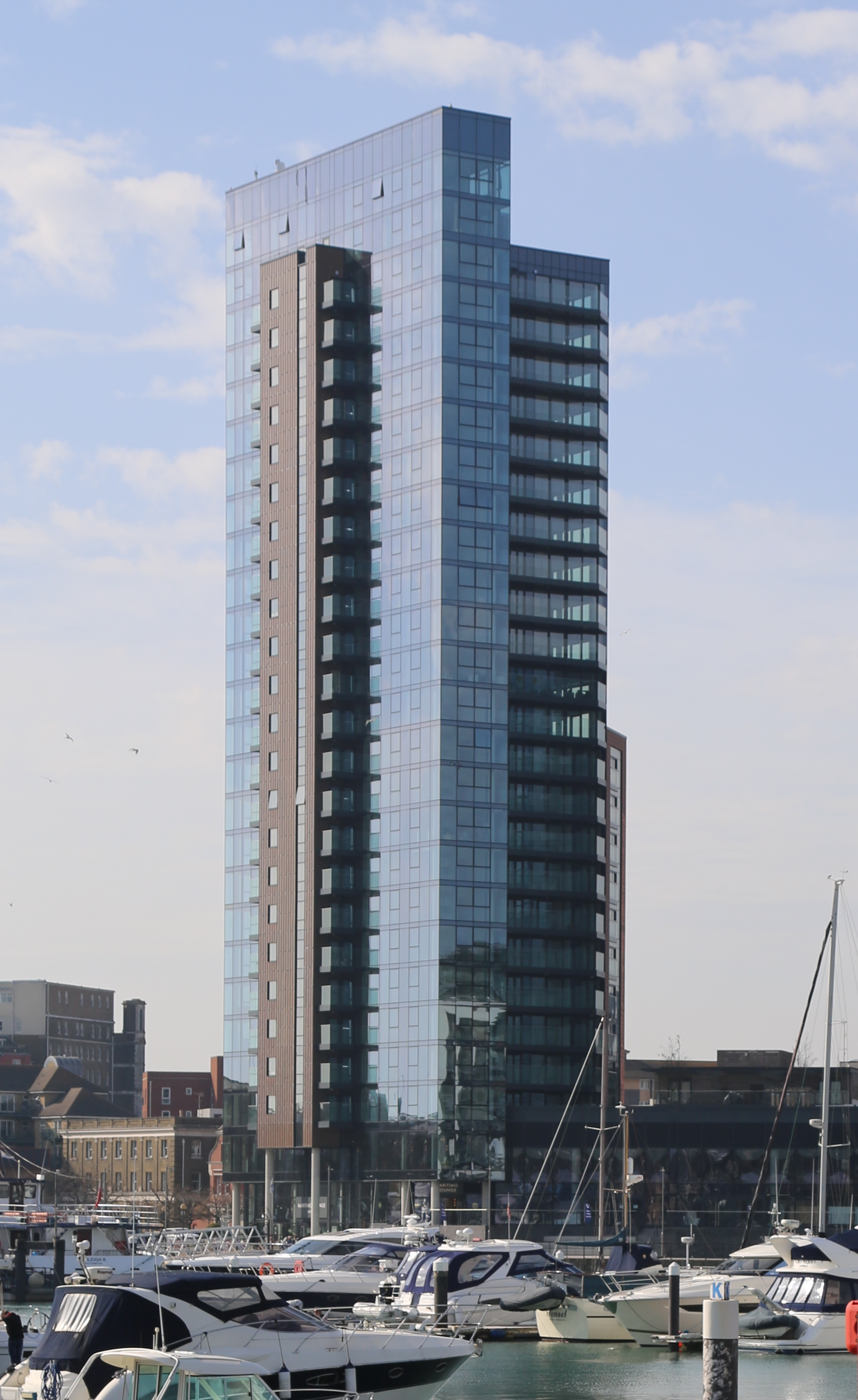
Moresby Tower, formerly the city's tallest building

=== Ocean Car Park ===
With space for 776 vehicles over six storeys, the Ocean Car Park was opened in 2009. It was awarded the Safer Parking Scheme ParkMark, an "acknowledgement of high standards of safety, security and quality".

=== Splash and Ocean Village Innovation Centre (OVIC) ===
Linden Homes completed work to Splash, a mixed residential/commercial development with 130 apartments, and an "Innovation Centre", providing office accommodation for new "knowledge based industries", in 2011.

=== Admiral's Quay ===
Following the economic recession which halted progress of the Admiral's Quay development upon the completion of its first phase, Barratt's Homes sold the empty Phase 2 site for £5.7m in 2011 to Allied Developments, a Southampton-based property development company. A planning application was filed with Southampton City Council in October 2011 which included a residential 26-storey tower, 299 apartments, and several new waterside bars and restaurants at a projected cost of £74m.

=== Harbour Hotel Southampton ===
In late 2011 Harbour Hotels, the operator of sixteen hotels along the South Coast of England, announced their interest in creating a mixed hotel/residential/commercial development on the disused Promontory and current surface car park. A planning application was filed at the end of December 2011 and construction work started in July 2014. The Harbour Hotel at Ocean Village officially opened in October 2017.
