= Royal Southampton Yacht Club =

- Burgee of Royal Southampton YC

- Blue Ensign defaced with crown
- Nickname: RSYC
- Founded: 1875
- Website: http://www.rsyc.org.uk

Royal Southampton Yacht Club is located on the Beaulieu River in Hampshire. It received its Royal Charter in 1875 making it one of the oldest Yacht clubs in the UK.

== History ==
At the first regatta of the 1840 season, the club announced, "...that her Majesty has been graciously pleased to consent to the Club being called "The Royal Southampton Yacht Club."

The Office of the Lord High Admiral warranted the club to use the distinguishing flag consisting of "a white ensign, with the crown and Southampton arms in the centre" in parliamentary papers from 1859. In the previous year, the Admiralty had withdrawn permission to fly the White Ensign from any yacht club except for the Royal Yacht Squadron.

The West Quay Regatta Club was formally established in 1866 but had existed for many years before that date, and was known as the "father" of the Royal Southampton Yacht Club.

When the cornerstone of a new clubhouse was laid in 1885, the estimated cost of the planned building with land included, was about £8,000, occupying an area of about 8000 square feet, three stories high, with a basement and a tower.

The planned building was further described:

The design is "domestic gothic", and the premises will be of local red bricks, pointed with black mortar, the dressings being executed in red terra-cotta The building will contain a large room for the club meeting, smoking, library, chess, billiard, dining, and other rooms, while every attention has been paid to the ventilation, sanitation, and the comfort and convenience of the members. The architect is Mr W. H. Mitchell, of Southampton; the contractors Messrs J. Crook and Sons, of the same town, and the building, which already shows above the hoarding, is to bo ready for occupation before the end of the present year.

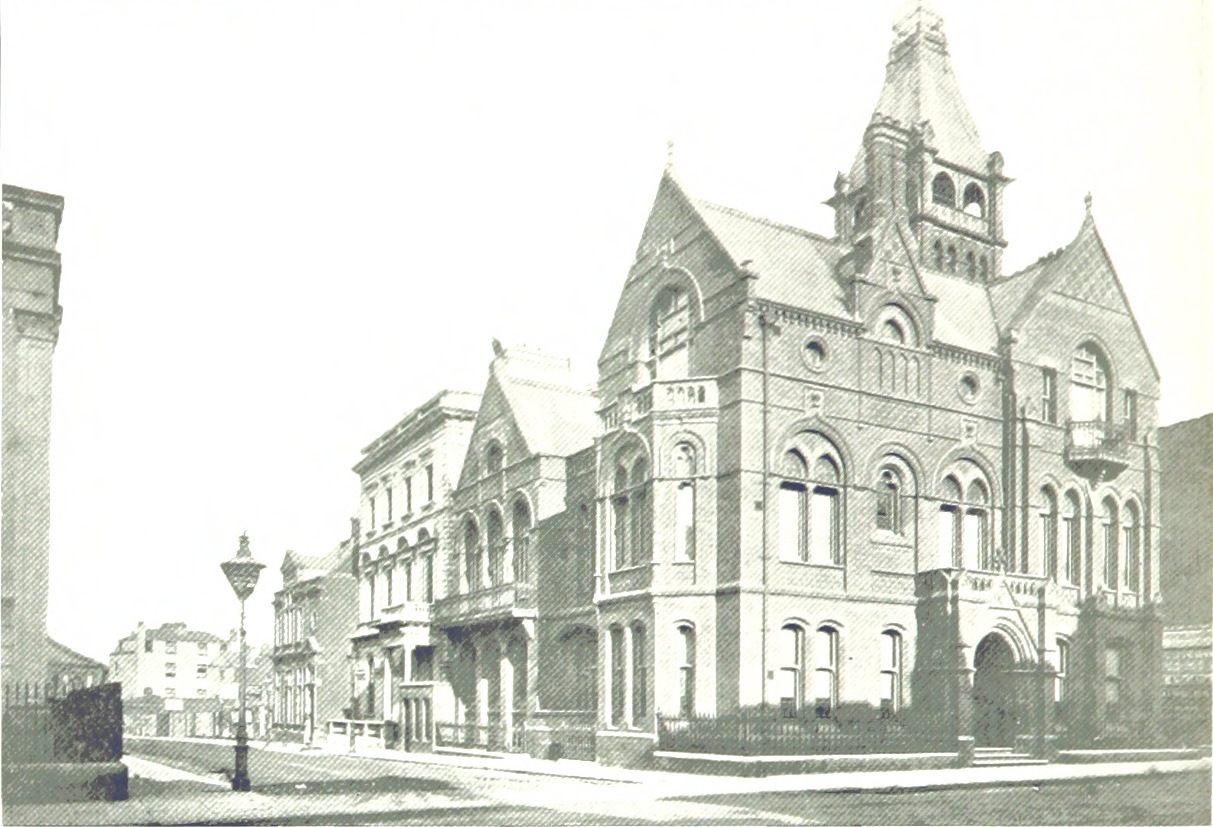
Royal Southampton Yacht Club's premises at Above Bar

In 1886, members celebrated the opening of the new facility, "new and extensive premises erected for the members of the club, on a portion of the land Above Bar, known as the Ogle site, in the place formerly occupied by the Circus, which building, by no means an ornament to the locality, has now given way to the large and handsome structure in future to be the headquarters of the successful Yacht Club, which had its origin in Southampton, where so many of the most superior of the British Yachting fleet have been built."

According to the Daily Telegraph, in 1897 "The Queen's Cup is first presented to the Royal Southampton Yacht Club by Queen Victoria. It was won by Latana and is still awarded today to the IRC Class Zero winner of the first Saturday's racing."

As of 1898 the club had over 200 members and organised the annual Southampton Regatta. The annual membership subscription fee at the time was 10 shillings and sixpence.

More recently, Ocean Village in Southampton included "a building for the Royal Southampton Yacht Club Houses built in the early 1990s".

== Locations built ==
- 1885 to 1957 - Clubhouse located in Above Bar, Southampton.
- 1957 to 1988 - Northlands Road, opposite the County Cricket ground.
- 1988 to 2018 - Clubhouse in Ocean village marina.
- 1964 to present - Clubhouse at Gins, on Beaulieu River

== See also ==
- Royal Southern Yacht Club
