= Gloucester Guildhall =

Municipal building in Gloucester, Gloucestershire, England

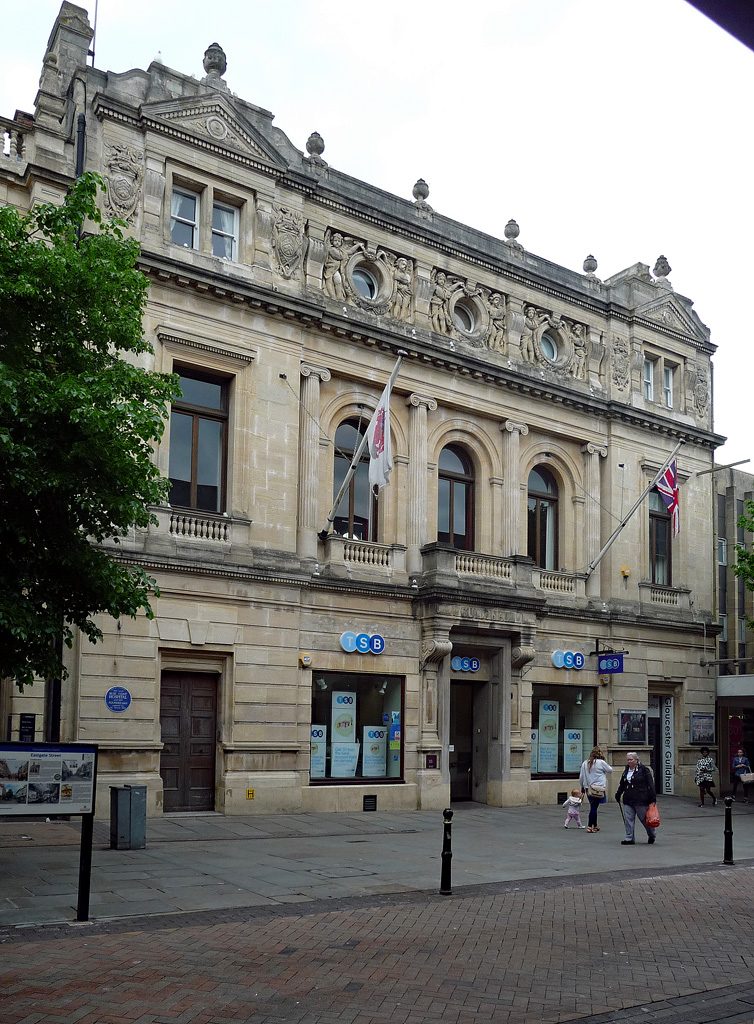
- Gloucester Guildhall

- Location within Gloucestershire
- 51.8646°N 2.2468°W
- Location: Eastgate Street, Gloucester, Gloucestershire

History
- Built: 1892

Site notes
- Architect: George H. Hunt
- Architectural style: French Renaissance style

Listed Building – Grade II
- Designated: 12 March 1973
- Reference no.: 1271663

Gloucester Guildhall is a former municipal building in Eastgate Street, Gloucester, which is now used as an arts and theatre venue. It is a Grade II listed building.

== History ==
The original town hall, known as "the Tolsey" meaning "town hall", was a 15th-century building located on the corner of Westgate Street and Southgate Street. It was rebuilt in the neo-classical style in 1751 but was inadequate for the needs of civic leaders by the late 19th century.

The site chosen for the new building had previously been occupied by Sir Thomas Rich's house, the initial home of Sir Thomas Rich's School, but had become vacant when the school moved to the site of the former Crypt School in Barton Street in 1889.

The new building, which was designed by George H. Hunt in the French Renaissance style, was completed in 1892. The exterior design involved five bays with an entrance flanked by pilasters on the ground floor; there were five french doors with fanlights interspersed by four Ionic order pilasters together with a central stone balcony on the first floor; there were three circular windows with a moulded architrave above them on the second floor and vases were erected at roof level. Internally, the principal rooms on the first floor were the main hall and the council chamber. Works of art contained in the guildhall included a silver gilt roundel dated 1563 bearing the arms of Sir Thomas Bell, a former mayor of Gloucester.

King Edward VII visited the guildhall on 23 June 1909 before departing for the Royal Agricultural Show at the Oxlease Showground on Alney Island. The guildhall also received a visit by the Queen Elizabeth II, accompanied by Duke of Edinburgh, to celebrate the 800th anniversary of the granting of the city's charter by King Henry II, on 3 May 1955.

For much of the 20th century the guildhall was the meeting place of the county borough of Gloucester; it continued to be the local seat of government following the formation of the enlarged Gloucester City Council in 1974. However, in 1985 the council decided to move their meeting place to a converted warehouse at Gloucester Docks.

The ground floor was converted into offices in 1987; a lease on the floor was taken by a branch of Cheltenham & Gloucester which, in September 2013, evolved into a branch of TSB Bank. Meanwhile, on the upper floors, an arts centre was established; the council chamber was converted into a cinema with capacity to seat 100 people in 1991, while the main hall, which has a capacity to seat 400 people, is still available for public use. The rock band, EMF, recorded a video of their first single, "Unbelievable", which reached number 3 on the UK Singles Chart, in the main hall one night in 1990.
