= Gloucester City Council =

UK non-metropolitan district council

Type
- Type: Non-metropolitan district

Leadership
- Mayor: Adrian Graham, Independent since 18 May 2026
- Leader: Vacant since 24 September 2026
- Managing Director: Jon McGinty since 2015

Structure
- Seats: 39 councillors
- Graph of the party split among 39 seats.
- Political groups: All parties (39) Liberal Democrats (17) Conservative (10) Labour (7) Independent (5)

Elections
- Voting system: First past the post
- Last election: 2 May 2024

Meeting place
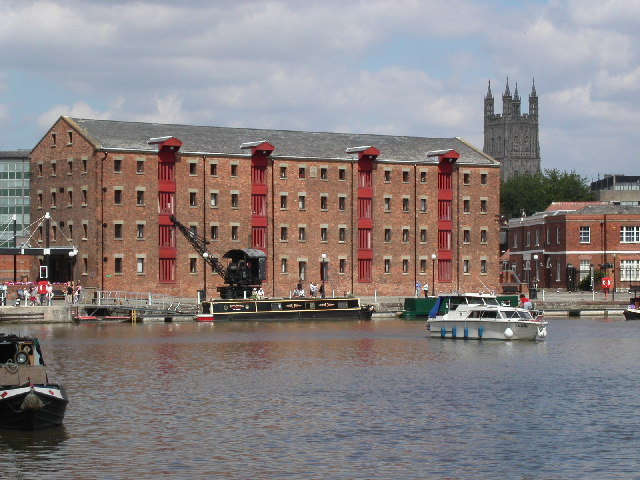
- North Warehouse, The Docks, Gloucester, GL1 2EP

Website
- www.gloucester.gov.uk

Gloucester City Council is the local authority for the city of Gloucester, in Gloucestershire, England. Gloucester has had a council since medieval times, which has been reformed on numerous occasions. Since 1974 Gloucester has been a non-metropolitan district with city status.

The council has been under no overall control since the 2024 election. It meets at North Warehouse at Gloucester Docks and has its main offices within the Eastgate Shopping Centre.

== History ==
Gloucester was an ancient borough. In 1483 it was made a county corporate with its own magistrates, making it administratively separate from the surrounding county of Gloucestershire. Gloucester gained city status on the creation of the Diocese of Gloucester in 1541.

The city was reformed in 1836 to become a municipal borough, governed by a body formally called the "mayor, aldermen and citizens of the city of Gloucester", but generally known as the corporation or city council. When elected county councils were established in 1889 under the Local Government Act 1888 Gloucester was considered large enough to run its own county-level services and so it was made a county borough, independent from Gloucestershire County Council.

The city was reconstituted as a non-metropolitan district on 1 April 1974 under the Local Government Act 1972. The city kept the same boundaries but became a lower-tier district authority, with Gloucestershire County Council providing county-level services to the city for the first time. The city's boundaries were enlarged in 1991, notably gaining the parish of Quedgeley from Stroud District.

Under current local government reorganisation plans, the council will be abolished from 2028, with a single council for all of the current Gloucestershire County Council area.

== Governance ==
Gloucester City Council provides district-level services. County-level services are provided by Gloucestershire County Council. The Quedgeley area of the city is also a civil parish with a town council, which forms a third tier of local government. The rest of the city, roughly corresponding to the pre-1974 county borough, is an unparished area.

=== Political control ===
The council has been under no overall control since 2024. It was then led by a Liberal Democrat minority administration until September 2026 when the leader lost a vote of no confidence. No new leader was immediately appointed.

Political control of the council since the 1974 reforms has been as follows:

Party in control	Years
Conservative	1974–1984
No overall control	1984–1987
Conservative	1987–1990
No overall control	1990–1995
Labour	1995–2002
No overall control	2002–2011
Conservative	2011–2012
No overall control	2012–2015
Conservative	2015–2024
No overall control	2024–present

=== Leadership ===
The role of Mayor of Gloucester is largely ceremonial. Political leadership is instead provided by the leader of the council. The leaders since 1995 have been:

Councillor	Party	From	To
Kevin Stephens	Labour	22 May 1995	2 Oct 1995
Jon Holmes	Labour	26 Oct 1995	May 1999
Kevin Stephens	Labour	May 1999	May 2003
Bill Crowther	Liberal Democrats	13 May 2003	27 Nov 2003
Mary Smith	Labour	27 Nov 2003	22 Jun 2004
Mark Hawthorne	Conservative	22 Jun 2004	May 2007
Paul James	Conservative	21 May 2007	21 Nov 2019
Richard Cook	Conservative	21 Nov 2019	May 2024
Jeremy Hilton	Liberal Democrats	20 May 2024	24 Sep 2026

=== Composition ===
Following the 2024 election and subsequent changes of allegiance up to March 2026, the composition of the council was:

Party	Councillors
Liberal Democrats	17
Conservative	10
Labour	7
Independent	5
Total	39

Four of the independent councillors sit together as the "Community Independent Group".

== Premises ==
The council meets at North Warehouse at Gloucester Docks. Its main offices are in Eastgate Shopping Centre in the City Centre.

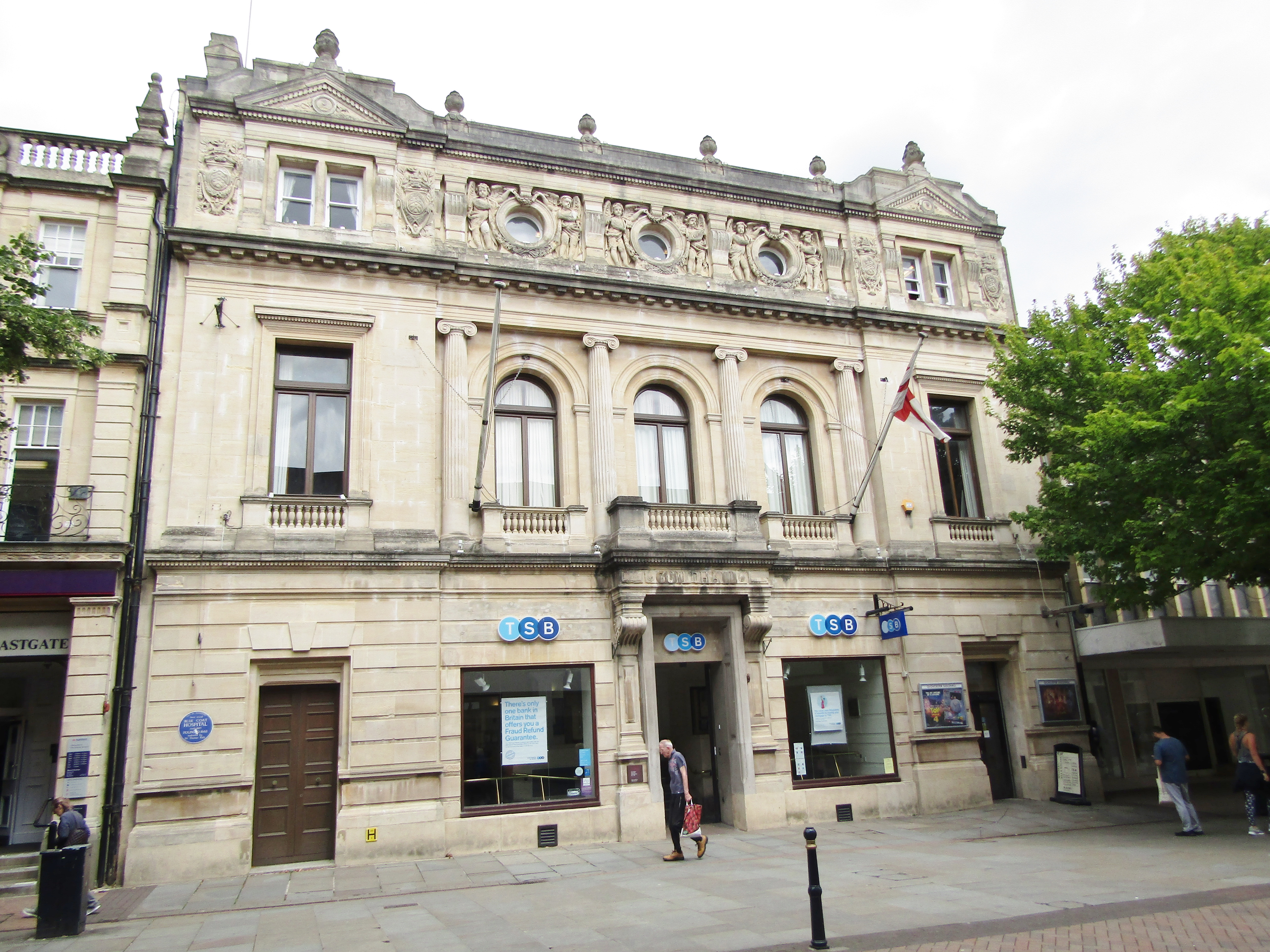
Guildhall, 23 Eastgate Street: Council's headquarters 1892–1986.

Between 1892 and 1986 the council was based at the Guildhall at 23 Eastgate Street. In 1985 the council purchased North Warehouse at Gloucester Docks, which had been built in 1826. North Warehouse was reconfigured internally to provide a civic suite and council chamber, as well as office space for the council. The council vacated Guildhall and moved to North Warehouse in 1986. Around the same time, the council also leased from the Canal & River Trust three nearby warehouses called Herbert Warehouse, Kimberley Warehouse and Philpotts Warehouse, which had all been built in 1846. The former Kimberley and Philpotts warehouses were incorporated into Herbert Warehouse via glazed linking sections being added between them, with a public house and retail uses on the ground floor and additional council offices on the upper floors. The Herbert Warehouse building was completed in 1988.

In 2019 the council vacated Herbert Warehouse, instead leasing office space for its staff within Shire Hall and also acquiring a former shop at 92–96 Westgate Street to be the council's main public reception, called "The Gateway". The council's meeting place remains the council chamber and civic suite in North Warehouse. The council's offices moved from Shire Hall to the Eastgate Shopping Centre in 2022.

== Elections ==
Since the last boundary changes in 2016 the council has comprised 39 councillors representing 18 wards, with each ward electing one, two or three councillors. Elections are held every four years.
