= LV 91 =

Former lightvessel

Coordinates: 51°36′57.00″N 3°56′18.00″W

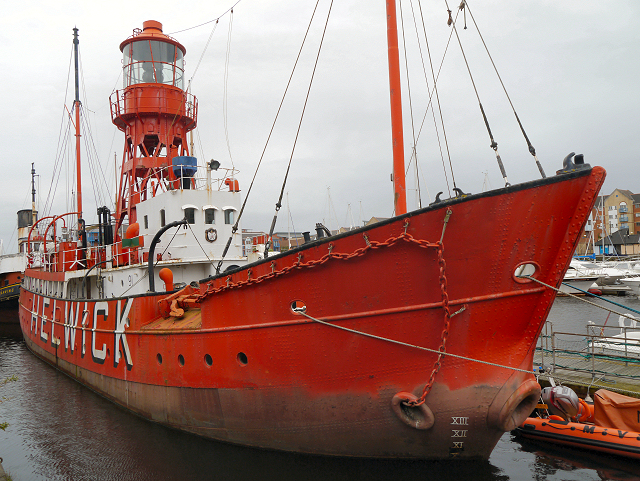
LV 91 Helwick

LV 91 is a former Trinity House lightvessel that is now a museum ship in Swansea.

LV 91 is on the National Historic Ships UK register as "Light Vessel 91 Humber".

LV 91 is owned by Swansea Museum and displayed in Swansea Marina as "Light Vessel 91 Helwick".

== See also ==
- List of lightvessels of Great Britain
- List of museum ships
