= LV 78 Calshot Spit =

Coordinates: 50.89793°N 1.39313°W

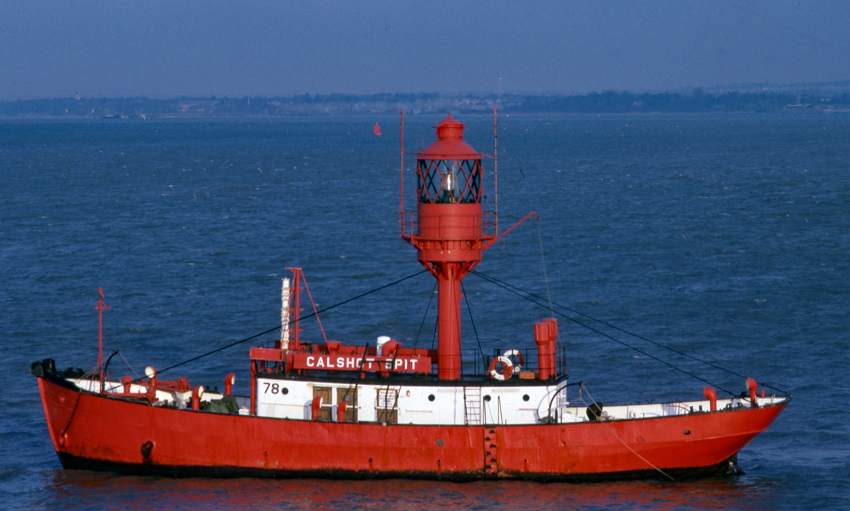
Light vessel 78 Calshot Spit on station in 1979

LV 78 Calshot Spit is a former Trinity House lightvessel that was anchored off Calshot Spit and is now a museum ship in Southampton.

LV 78 was built in 1914 by John I. Thornycroft & Company shipyard in Southampton and decommissioned in 1987. She was stationed at the entrance to the Port of Southampton to act as a floating lighthouse to guide ships and flying boats entering Southampton Water.

After decommissioning in 1987 she became a static attraction at the Ocean Village marina in Southampton from 1988 to 2010. In November 2010 she was moved a short distance to the Trafalgar dock where, after renovation, she was to be displayed at the "Aeronautica" attraction, due to open in 2015. The plans for "Aeronautica" came to a halt in January 2012. In December 2019 the ship was relocated to the Solent Sky museum under plans for it to be converted into part of the museum's café. The vessel remains on dry land outside Solent Sky museum awaiting developments.

LV 78 is on the National Historic Ships UK register.

== See also ==
- List of lightvessels of Great Britain
- List of museum ships
