= 2024 Gloucester City Council election =

2024 English local election

- 2 May 2024

All 39 seats to Gloucester City Council 20 seats needed for a majority

	First party	Second party
Leader	Jeremy Hilton	Richard Cook
Party	Liberal Democrats	Conservative
Last election	10 seats, 27.9%	26 seats, 47.1%
Seats before	14	21
Seats won	17	11
Seat change	▲3	▼10
Popular vote	19,963	17,731
Percentage	32.8%	29.2%
Swing	▲4.9%	▼17.9%
	Third party	Fourth party
Leader	Terry Pullen	Alastair Chambers
Party	Labour	Independent
Last election	3 seats, 17.8%	0 seats, 4.4%
Seats before	2	2
Seats won	7	4
Seat change	▲5	▲2
Popular vote	14,486	5,645
Percentage	23.8%	9.3%
Swing	▲6.0%	▲4.9%
- Winner of each seat at the 2024 Gloucester City Council election
Leader before election
Richard Cook
Conservative
Leader after election
Jeremy Hilton
Liberal Democrat
No overall control

The 2024 Gloucester City Council election took place on 2 May 2024 to elect all 39 members of Gloucester City Council in England. This was on the same day as other local elections, including Quedgeley Town Council, and the Police and Crime Commissioner for Gloucestershire.

== Summary ==
Prior to the election the council was under Conservative majority control. The Conservative leader of the council, Richard Cook, who had been leader of the council since 2019, chose not to stand for re-election.

After the election the council was left under no overall control with the Liberal Democrats as the largest party. They subsequently formed a minority administration, with their group leader, Jeremy Hilton, being appointed leader of the council at the subsequent annual council meeting on 20 May 2024. The Conservatives appointed Stephanie Chambers to be their new group leader in opposition.

=== Election result ===
2024 Gloucester City Council election
Party	Candidates	Seats	Gains	Losses	Net gain/loss	Seats %	Votes %	Votes	+/−
Liberal Democrats	36	17	0	0	▲3	43.6	32.8	19,963	+4.9
Conservative	39	11	0	0	▼10	28.2	29.2	17,731	–17.9
Labour	32	7	0	0	▲5	17.9	23.8	14,486	+6.0
Independent	20	4	0	0	▲2	10.3	9.3	5,645	+4.9
Green	12	0	0	0	Steady	0.0	3.7	2,223	+1.4
Socialist Labour	6	0	0	0	Steady	0.0	0.9	572	N/A
TUSC	3	0	0	0	Steady	0.0	0.3	199	+0.1

== Ward results ==
Sitting councilors are marked with an asterisk (*).

=== Abbeydale ===
Abbeydale
Party	Candidate	Votes	%	±%
Conservative	Andrew Gravells*	806	49.2	−17.3
Conservative	Louise Walker	572	34.9	−13.9
Labour	Anita Masters	418	25.5	N/A
Labour	Amie Hewish	408	24.9	N/A
Liberal Democrats	Collette Finnegan*	330	20.1	−28.7
Liberal Democrats	Fiona Bromby	249	15.2	−4.5
Independent	Tom Grant	190	11.6	N/A
Turnout		1,639	33	
Conservative hold		Swing		
Conservative hold		Swing		

=== Abbeymead ===
Abbeymead
Party	Candidate	Votes	%	±%
Conservative	Laura Brooker*	712	48.2	−6.9
Conservative	Kate Hyland	523	35.4	−5.2
Liberal Democrats	Adam Gatier	488	33.1	+5.6
Liberal Democrats	Jade Emraz	467	31.6	+4.3
Labour	Robbie Brewster-Lowry	285	19.3	+3.3
Labour	Stuart Moakes	245	16.6	N/A
Turnout		1,476	33	
Conservative hold		Swing		
Conservative hold		Swing		

=== Barnwood ===
Barnwood
Party	Candidate	Votes	%	±%
Liberal Democrats	Ashley Bowkett*	752	43.0	+5.8
Liberal Democrats	Joshua Taylor	598	34.2	−7.8
Conservative	Suzanne Pearsall	373	21.3	−14.1
Independent	Fred Ramsey	329	18.8	−16.6
Labour	David Cullum	318	18.2	+6.6
Conservative	Liz Maguire	310	17.7	−11.9
Independent	Jane Ramsey	309	17.7	N/A
Labour	Jake Pier	271	15.5	N/A
Turnout		1,749	36	
Liberal Democrats hold		Swing		
Liberal Democrats hold		Swing		

=== Barton & Tredworth ===
Barton & Tredworth
Party	Candidate	Votes	%	±%
Conservative	Sajid Patel*	846	36.5	−21.0
Liberal Democrats	Usman Bhaimia*	763	32.9	−6.8
Labour	Roseanna Marshall	753	32.5	−7.2
Conservative	Shamsuz Litu*	628	27.1	−16.3
Conservative	Mohiyouddin Fadra	544	23.5	−9.7
Green	Emma Clifford	383	16.5	+6.0
Liberal Democrats	Angela Oliver	341	14.7	+8.8
Liberal Democrats	Daniel Courtney	328	14.2	N/A
Socialist Labour	Akhlaque Ahmed	296	12.8	N/A
Green	Matt Phypers	281	12.1	N/A
Independent	Alan Platt	213	9.2	N/A
Independent	Benjamin Baker	201	8.7	N/A
Independent	Daniel Woolf	172	7.4	N/A
Socialist Labour	Saiham Sikder	164	7.1	N/A
TUSC	Susan Powell	106	4.6	+2.0
TUSC	James Collett	64	2.8	−0.2
Turnout		2,318	30	
Conservative hold		Swing		
Liberal Democrats gain from Conservative		Swing		
Labour hold		Swing		

=== Coney Hill ===
Coney Hill
Party	Candidate	Votes	%	±%
Labour	Tracy Millard	252	43.3	+13.9
Independent	Byron Davis	190	32.6	N/A
Conservative	Mika Price	83	14.3	−24.0
Liberal Democrats	David Gayler	24	4.1	−17.5
Green	Adam Shearing	20	3.4	−0.4
Socialist Labour	Toriqul Islam	13	2.2	N/A
Turnout		582	24	
Labour gain from Conservative		Swing		

=== Elmbridge ===
Elmbridge
Party	Candidate	Votes	%	±%
Liberal Democrats	Anne Radley*	1,065	71.0	+28.9
Liberal Democrats	Vicky Norledge	875	58.4	+18.3
Conservative	Simon Locke	319	21.3	−6.3
Conservative	Ella Kubaszczyk	251	16.7	−14.2
Green	Fran Griffiths	235	15.7	+4.5
Turnout		1,499	32	
Liberal Democrats hold		Swing		
Liberal Democrats hold		Swing		

=== Grange ===
Grange
Party	Candidate	Votes	%	±%
Conservative	Sylvia Evans*	552	38.2	−3.9
Independent	Andrew Bell	458	31.7	N/A
Labour	Gary Davis	455	31.5	+10.6
Conservative	Jennie Watkins	445	30.8	−17.6
Labour	Simon Cozens	442	30.6	N/A
Liberal Democrats	Karen Minchin	136	9.4	+3.2
Liberal Democrats	Kira Moffatt	136	9.4	N/A
Turnout		1,445	29	
Conservative hold		Swing		
Independent gain from Conservative		Swing		

=== Hucclecote ===
Hucclecote
Party	Candidate	Votes	%	±%
Liberal Democrats	Declan Wilson*	1,174	65.4	+15.6
Liberal Democrats	Alwin Wiederhold	1,134	63.1	−4.7
Conservative	Jen Hawkins	304	16.9	−10.2
Conservative	Shirley Darke	298	16.6	−8.9
Labour	Niamh Walsh	250	13.9	N/A
Labour	Anne Whitworth	243	13.5	N/A
Turnout		1,796	36	
Liberal Democrats hold		Swing		
Liberal Democrats hold		Swing		

=== Kingsholm & Wotton ===
Kingsholm & Wotton
Party	Candidate	Votes	%	±%
Liberal Democrats	Jeremy Hilton*	840	58.9	+0.2
Liberal Democrats	Angela Conder*	764	53.6	+5.7
Labour	Kären Clarke	330	23.2	+1.4
Labour	Aaron Bennett	326	22.9	N/A
Conservative	Duncan Hall	223	15.6	±0.0
Conservative	Peter Sheehy	205	14.4	−7.0
Turnout		1,425	29	
Liberal Democrats hold		Swing		
Liberal Democrats hold		Swing		

=== Kingsway ===
Kingsway
Party	Candidate	Votes	%	±%
Labour	Karen James	557	47.9	+14.8
Labour	John Jones	530	45.6	N/A
Conservative	Jaro Kubaszczyk*	284	24.4	−16.1
Conservative	Tracey Williams	260	22.4	−31.3
Independent	Gill White	146	12.6	N/A
Liberal Democrats	Vicki Field	135	11.6	−7.7
Green	Jinny Harvey	94	8.1	N/A
Liberal Democrats	George Barwood	58	5.0	N/A
Turnout		1,163	28	
Labour gain from Conservative		Swing		
Labour gain from Conservative		Swing		

=== Longlevens ===
Longlevens
Party	Candidate	Votes	%	±%
Liberal Democrats	Linda Castle*	1,482	57.9	+11.9
Liberal Democrats	Sarah Sawyer*	1,367	53.4	+15.6
Liberal Democrats	Luke Shervey	1,109	43.3	+8.6
Conservative	Kathy Williams*	944	36.9	−12.8
Conservative	Jeremy Base	755	29.5	−10.1
Conservative	Suresh Arava	718	28.0	−6.1
Green	Ed Farrow	275	10.7	N/A
Green	Paul Stroud	234	9.1	N/A
Turnout		2,561	35	
Liberal Democrats hold		Swing		
Liberal Democrats gain from Conservative		Swing		
Liberal Democrats gain from Conservative		Swing		

=== Matson, Robinswood & White City ===
Matson, Robinswood & White City
Party	Candidate	Votes	%	±%
Independent	Alastair Chambers*	826	46.4	−1.5
Independent	Adrian Graham	758	42.6	N/A
Independent	Brendon O'Donnell*	716	40.2	+3.8
Labour	Jen Cole	657	36.9	+3.6
Labour	Ross Beamish	629	35.4	+4.8
Labour	Sam Maynard	578	32.5	+4.6
Conservative	Mary Tibbles	239	13.4	−34.5
Conservative	John Williams	205	11.5	−27.6
Conservative	Denzil Williams	193	10.8	−25.6
Green	Barbara Russell	140	7.9	−3.6
Socialist Labour	Kazol Ahmed	46	2.6	N/A
TUSC	Richard Price	29	1.6	N/A
Socialist Labour	Aswadul Fardeen	24	1.3	N/A
Turnout		1,779	27	
Independent gain from Conservative		Swing		
Independent gain from Conservative		Swing		
Independent gain from Conservative		Swing		

=== Moreland ===
Moreland
Party	Candidate	Votes	%	±%
Labour	Terry Pullen*	1,008	52.0	+18.4
Labour	Tree Chambers-Dubus*	967	49.9	+10.3
Labour	Valerie Simms	926	47.8	+14.4
Conservative	Lyn Ackroyd*	630	32.5	−10.3
Conservative	Robert Moreland	439	22.6	−9.5
Conservative	Harry de Medici	393	20.3	−11.2
Green	Eva Langrock-Bircher	272	14.0	+0.3
Independent	Simon Hiiemae	259	13.4	N/A
Liberal Democrats	Paul Caiden	152	7.8	−4.2
Liberal Democrats	Abigail Wilson	138	7.1	N/A
Liberal Democrats	James Cargill	124	6.4	N/A
Turnout		1,939		
Labour hold		Swing		
Labour hold		Swing		
Labour hold		Swing		

=== Podsmead ===
Podsmead
Party	Candidate	Votes	%	±%
Liberal Democrats	Sebastian Field*	386	45.4	+5.6
Labour	Nicky Blatchly-Lewis	260	30.6	+13.0
Conservative	Sarah Devaney	154	18.1	−18.4
Independent	Lee Powell	50	5.9	N/A
Turnout		850	35	
Liberal Democrats hold		Swing		

=== Quedgeley Fieldcourt ===
Quedgeley Fieldcourt
Party	Candidate	Votes	%	±%
Conservative	Stephanie Chambers	629	44.8	−18.5
Conservative	Victoria Miller	527	37.5	−15.6
Labour	Jane Low-Gameiro	419	29.8	N/A
Labour	Michael Adaarewaa	409	29.1	N/A
Liberal Democrats	David Bebbington	330	23.5	N/A
Liberal Democrats	Timothy Houlihan	302	21.5	−14.0
Socialist Labour	Foujia Metaly	29	2.1	N/A
Turnout		1,404	26	
Conservative hold		Swing		
Conservative hold		Swing		

=== Quedgeley Severn Vale ===
Quedgeley Severn Vale
Party	Candidate	Votes	%	±%
Liberal Democrats	Liam Harries	562	38.3	
Conservative	Andy Lewis*	417	28.4	
Liberal Democrats	Trevor Howard	391	26.6	
Conservative	Vicky Ranford	390	26.5	
Labour	Alison Gregory	296	20.1	
Labour	George Gordon	282	19.2	
Independent	Anna Mozol	169	11.5	
Green	Jack Mantle	69	4.7	
Independent	Hayley Cook	66	4.5	
Green	Mark Rowney	50	3.4	
Independent	Dino Boyd	37	2.5	
Turnout		1,469	32	
Liberal Democrats gain from Conservative		Swing		
Conservative hold		Swing		

=== Tuffley ===
Tuffley
Party	Candidate	Votes	%	±%
Liberal Democrats	Caroline Courtney	562	36.3	+31.3
Conservative	Lorraine Campbell*	512	33.1	−11.3
Liberal Democrats	Joshua Hanley	477	30.8	N/A
Conservative	Paula Dee*	406	26.2	−13.4
Labour	Lewis Groves	328	21.2	−10.0
Labour	Lysander Barron	325	21.0	−8.1
Independent	Bert Mahoney	267	17.3	N/A
Turnout		1,547	34	
Liberal Democrats gain from Conservative		Swing		
Conservative hold		Swing		

=== Westgate ===
Westgate
Party	Candidate	Votes	%	±%
Liberal Democrats	Rebecca Trimnell*	809	41.3	+11.7
Conservative	Pam Tracey*	649	33.2	−9.9
Liberal Democrats	Howard Hyman**	623	31.8	+9.5
Conservative	Paul Critchley	515	26.3	−9.9
Liberal Democrats	Ola Kareem	492	25.1	+4.4
Labour	Rich Flower	483	24.7	+3.5
Conservative	Justin Hudson**	478	24.4	−10.9
Labour	Robert Kingston	448	22.9	+3.3
Labour	Jag Thangella	388	19.8	+0.7
Independent	David Purchase	269	13.7	N/A
Green	Deborah Oldham	190	9.7	−0.9
Turnout		1,957	28	
Liberal Democrats gain from Conservative		Swing		
Conservative hold		Swing		
Liberal Democrats gain from Conservative		Swing		

Justin Hudson was a sitting councillor for Quedgeley Severn Vale ward

Howard Hyman was a sitting councillor for Elmbridge ward
