= Solent Sky =

Aviation museum in Southampton, England

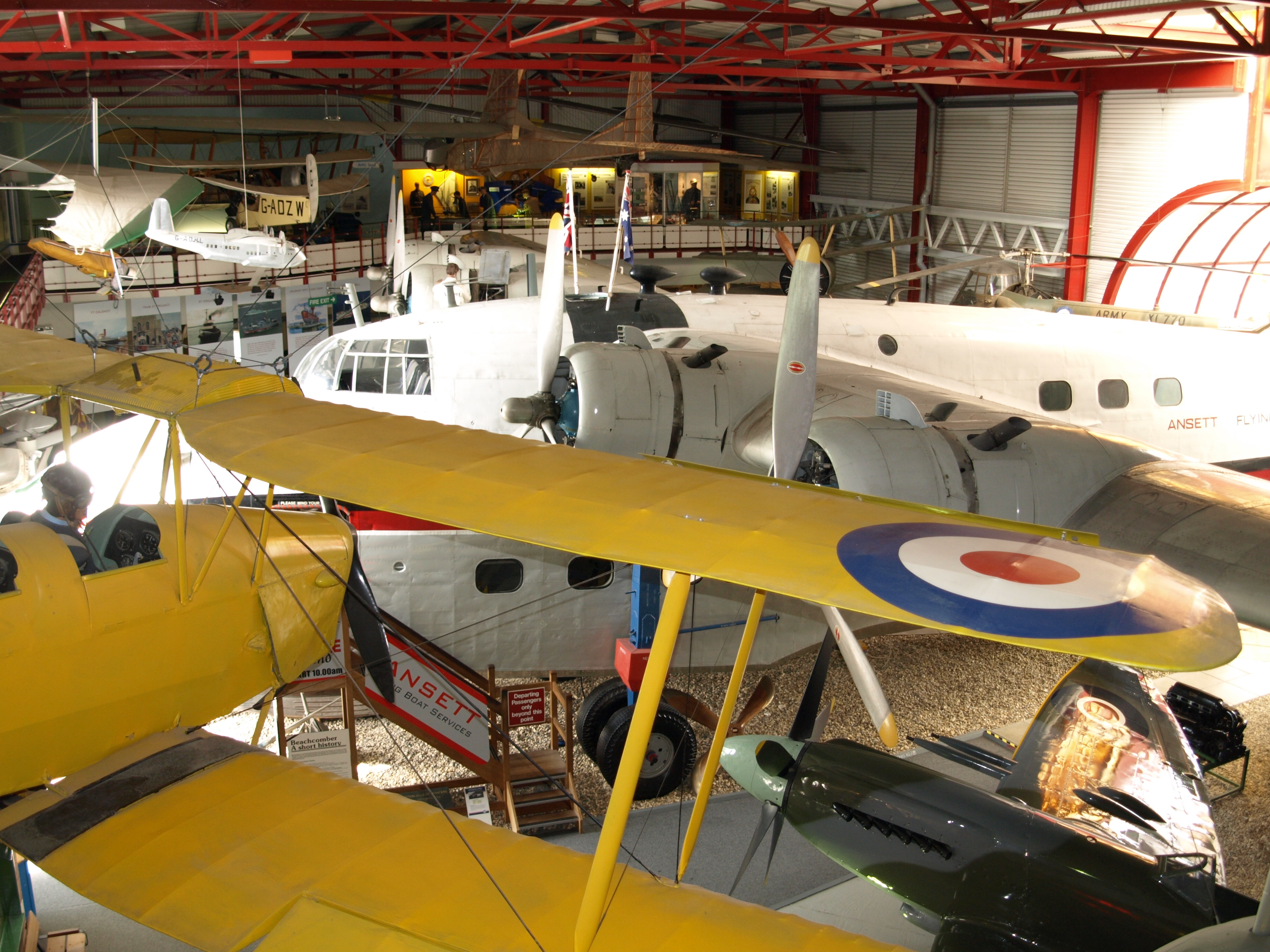

- Location within Southampton
- Established: 1984
- Location: Southampton, United Kingdom
- Coordinates: 50°53′53″N 1°23′35″W
- Type: Aviation museum
- Website: www.solentsky.org

Solent Sky (previously known as the Southampton Hall of Aviation) is an aviation museum in Southampton, England.

The museum depicts the history of aviation in Southampton, the Solent area and Hampshire. There is a focus on Supermarine, the aircraft company based in Woolston, Southampton, and its most famous products, the Supermarine S.6 seaplane and the Supermarine Spitfire, designed by a team led R. J. Mitchell. There is also coverage of the Schneider Trophy seaplane races, twice held at Calshot Spit, and the flying boat services which operated from the Solent.

== History ==
The forerunner to the museum was a museum (known as the RJ Mitchell Memorial Museum) focusing on Supermarine set up in the 1970s in a NAAFI hut in Kingsbridge Lane, alongside Havelock Road. In the latter part of 1982 decay of the buildings lead to the museum committee petitioning Southampton City Council to build a new museum.

Construction of the current building, at a reported cost of c.£800,000, began in 1983 and was designed by Barry Eaton, then the City Architect. A Short Sandringham on loan from the Science Museum Group was moved into the unfished building on 1 July 1983. The new museum opened 26 May 1984 as the Southampton Hall of Aviation in a ribbon cutting ceremony undertaken by then Mayor of Southampton; Irene Candy and competition winning local school pupil, Nicholas Chant.

In 2006, the museum was rebranded as Solent Sky.

On 25 November 2023 the fuselage of a BAC One-Eleven was moved to the exterior of the museum from Cornwall Aviation Heritage Centre. In November 2024 the museum was granted planning permission to build a connection between the aircraft fuselage and the main museum. In 2017 the museum acquired a Britten-Norman Trislander that had previously been operated by Aurigny. It was moved to their Southampton site in April 2025.

== Exhibits ==
Solent Sky houses over 20 aircraft and a number of aero-engines. Also on display are a number of models of former aircraft.

=== Aircraft ===
Aircraft on display at the museum include:.

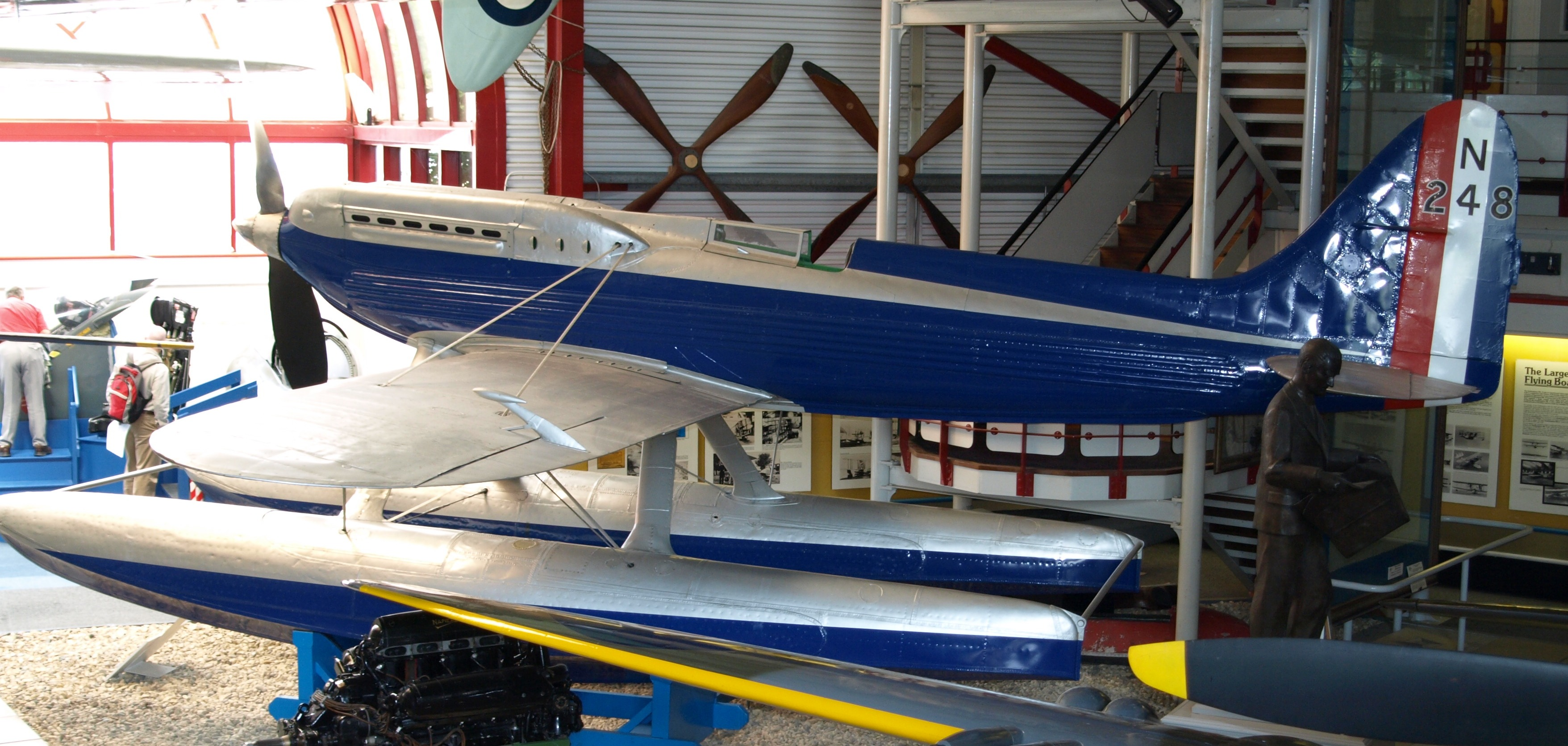
Supermarine S.6A, N248 on display.

A drone view of the museum

- Avro 504J - Replica
- Britten-Norman BN-1
- de Havilland Sea Vixen FAW Mk.2 - XJ571
- de Havilland Tiger Moth
- de Havilland Vampire
- Folland Gnat
- Hawker Siddeley Harrier GR.3 - Cockpit section. Modified to resemble Harrier FRS.1
- Mignet HM.14 Pou-du-Ciel
- Saro Skeeter (x 2)
- Saunders-Roe SR.A/1 - TG263
- Short Sandringham S.25/V - VH-BRC, Beachcomber
- Slingsby Grasshopper
- Slingsby Tandem Tutor
- SUMPAC
- Supermarine Nighthawk - propellers only
- Supermarine S.6A - N248, competed in the 1929 Schneider Trophy
- Supermarine Seagull - Nose section only
- Supermarine Spitfire F.24 - PK683
- Supermarine Swift - Cockpit section
- Wight Quadruplane - Replica

=== Engines ===
The following engines can be seen at the museum:

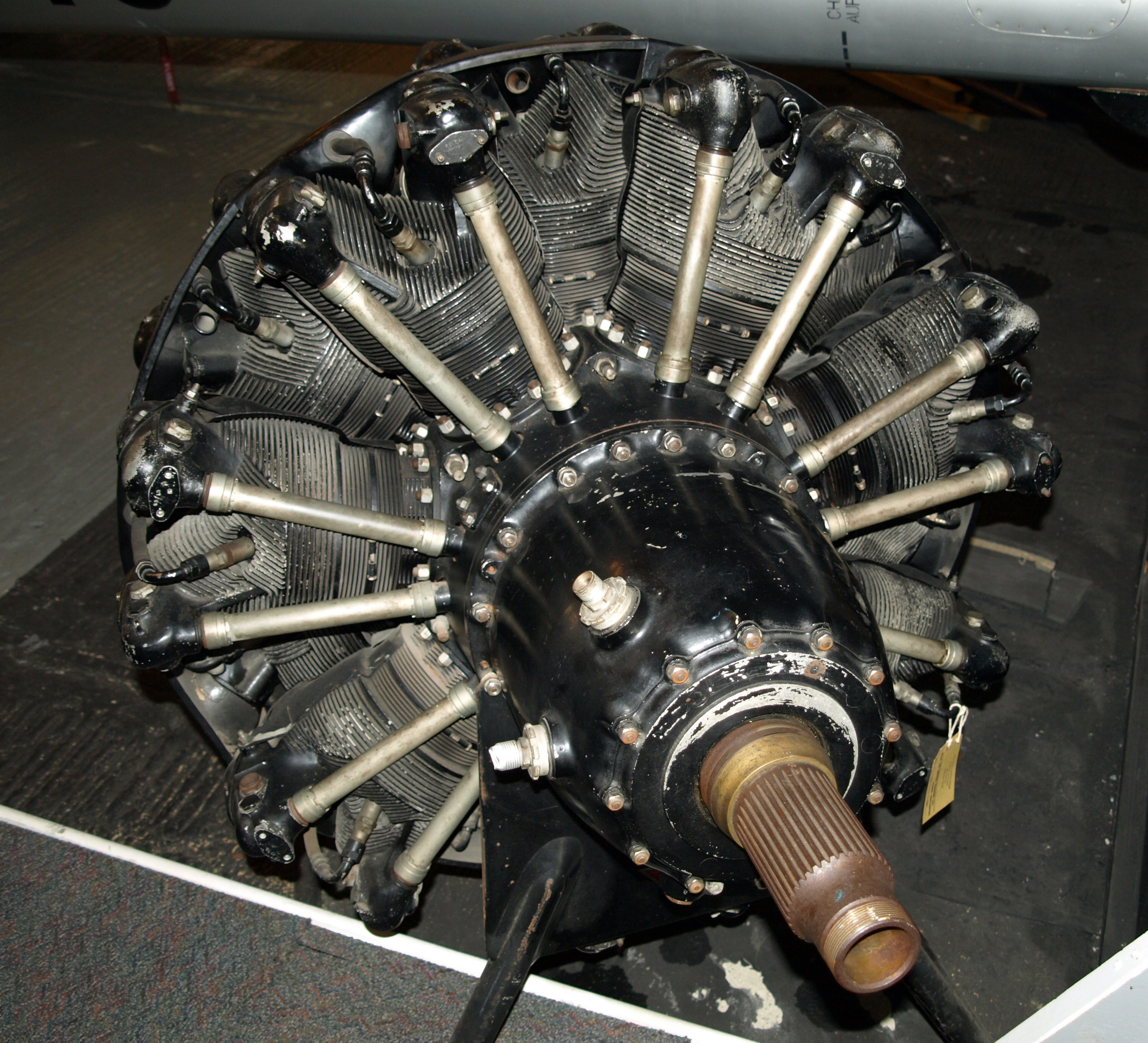
Alvis Leonides Major on display.

- Alvis Leonides
- Alvis Leonides Major
- Bristol Siddeley Orpheus
- Bristol Proteus
- de Havilland Gipsy Major
- Gnome Monosoupape
- Metrovick Beryl
- Napier Gazelle
- Napier Lion
- Napier Naiad
- Napier Sabre
- Napier Scorpion
- Rolls-Royce/Continental 0-300
- Rolls-Royce Derwent
- Rolls-Royce Merlin

=== Calshot Spit lightship ===
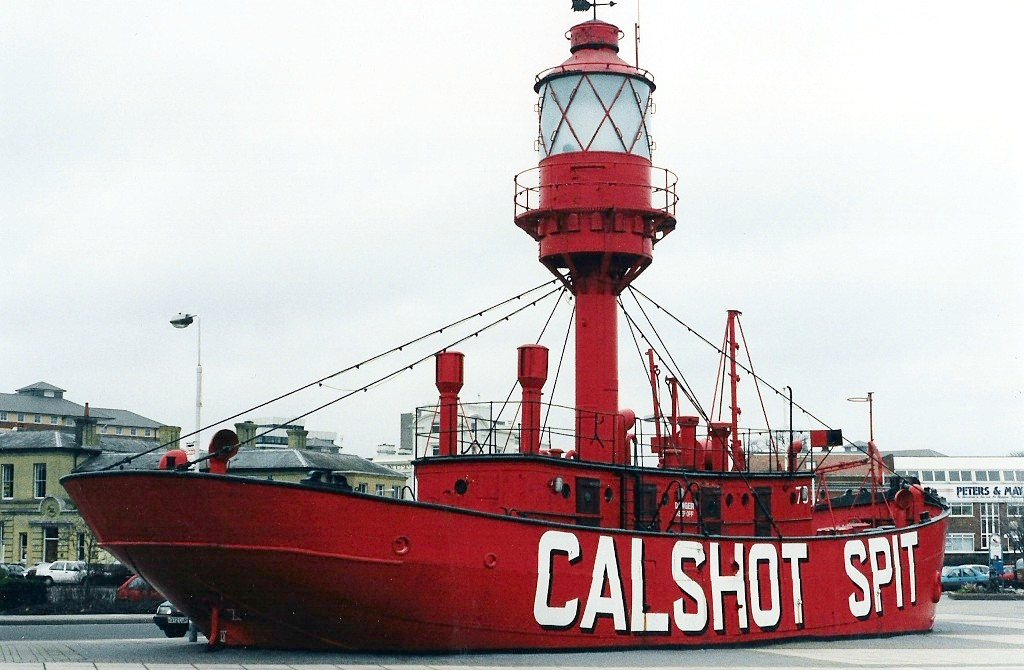
Calshot Spit Lightship

The LV 78 Calshot Spit is a lightship built in Southampton in 1914. It was decommissioned in 1987. Between 1988 and 2010, it was located at the entrance to Ocean Village marina, which formed a static attraction at the marina. This Trinity House navigation aid had guided ships entering Southampton Water from the western end of the Solent, coming around the low lying sand and shingle Calshot Spit. It was built in 1914 by J I Thornycroft shipyard in Southampton, and decommissioned in 1978. The lightship was removed on 3 November 2010 and taken to be restored at Trafalgar Dry Dock. The lightship was to become a "gateway attraction" at a new heritage museum called Aeronautica. The plans for Aeronautica came to a halt in January 2012. In December 2019 the Calshot Spit Lightship was transported to its new home at the Solent Sky Museum with plans to convert it into part of the museum's cafe.

== Other items ==
In 2017 an exhibition by the Hampshire Police and Fire Heritage Trust was added to the museum. In September 2020, three of Southampton's former trams were moved to the museum site. There are plans for the trams to undergo restoration before going on public display. The restoration of Tram 11 was completed by May 2025.

== Charity ==
The work of Solent Sky is supported by a registered charity, the R. J. Mitchell Memorial Museum Limited, whose objects are "to advance the education of the public in matters relating to aviation by establishing and maintaining a museum as a permanent memorial to R. J. Mitchell, the designer of the Schneider Trophy S6B seaplane and the Spitfire."

== See also ==
- List of aerospace museums
