= Gloucester Docks =

Area in Gloucester, England

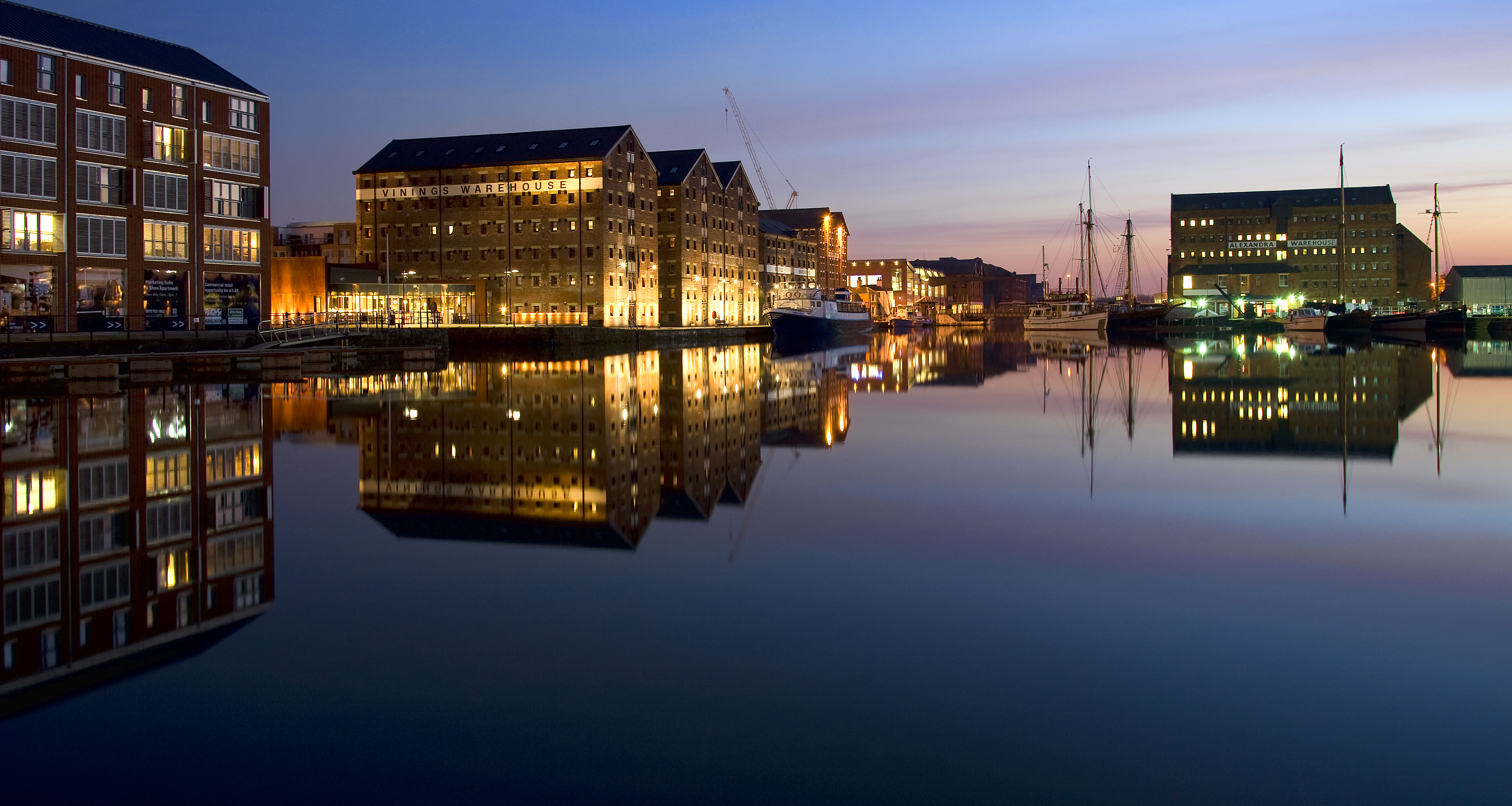

Location
- Location: Gloucester, England
- Coordinates: 51°51′45″N 2°15′07″W
- OS grid: SO 8274 1824

Details
- Owner: Gloucester City Council
- Operator: Gloucester Docks Estate Co.
- Opened: 1812; 214 years ago

Gloucester Docks is a historic area of the city of Gloucester. The docks are located at the northern junction of the River Severn with the Gloucester and Sharpness Canal. Gloucester is Britain's most inland port. The site is just south of the location of the former Gloucester Castle and to the north-west of the ruins of Llanthony Secunda Priory founded in 1136 by Augustinian canons from the mother house in Wales.

The docks include fourteen Victorian warehouses, that are now listed buildings. It also contains the Gloucester Waterways Museum (opened in 1988) and the Soldiers of Gloucestershire Museum (opened in 1990).

== History ==
=== Early history ===
The earliest reference to a quay on the River Severn at Gloucester was in 1390, though there is known to have been one since Anglo-Saxon times. In 1580, Gloucester received a charter from Elizabeth I as a customs port with a customs house being built on the riverside quay. By 1780, as many as 600 boats were berthing at Gloucester every year, despite vessels only being able to navigate the upper reaches of the river at spring tides.

=== 19th century expansion ===
In 1793 the Gloucester and Berkeley Canal Company received an Act of Parliament authorising the building of a new dock and ship canal cutting off the winding section of the River Severn. It was originally intended to rejoin the river at Berkeley Pill, the mouth of the Little Avon River. Work started in 1794 and by 1799 the basin had been completed along with a lock to allow access to the Severn, but only four miles of the canal had been completed when the money ran out. Eventually the direction of the works was taken over by Thomas Telford and the route shortened to join the Severn at Sharpness. The canal eventually opened in 1827.

In 1812, the lock started operating, allowing boats to access the new basin from the river to transship cargo. Shipbuilding facilities, including a rope walk, and a dry dock were added in 1814 and 1818 respectively. By 1824, traffic had increased to the point where the company constructed a second quay on the east side of the basin. The following year, an arm off the east side of the basin was constructed to remove the barge traffic from the quays. The barge arm was specified by Telford to be only 10 ft (3.0 m) deep and the quay walls were only 2 ft (0.61 m) high to facilitate unloading from the smaller craft.

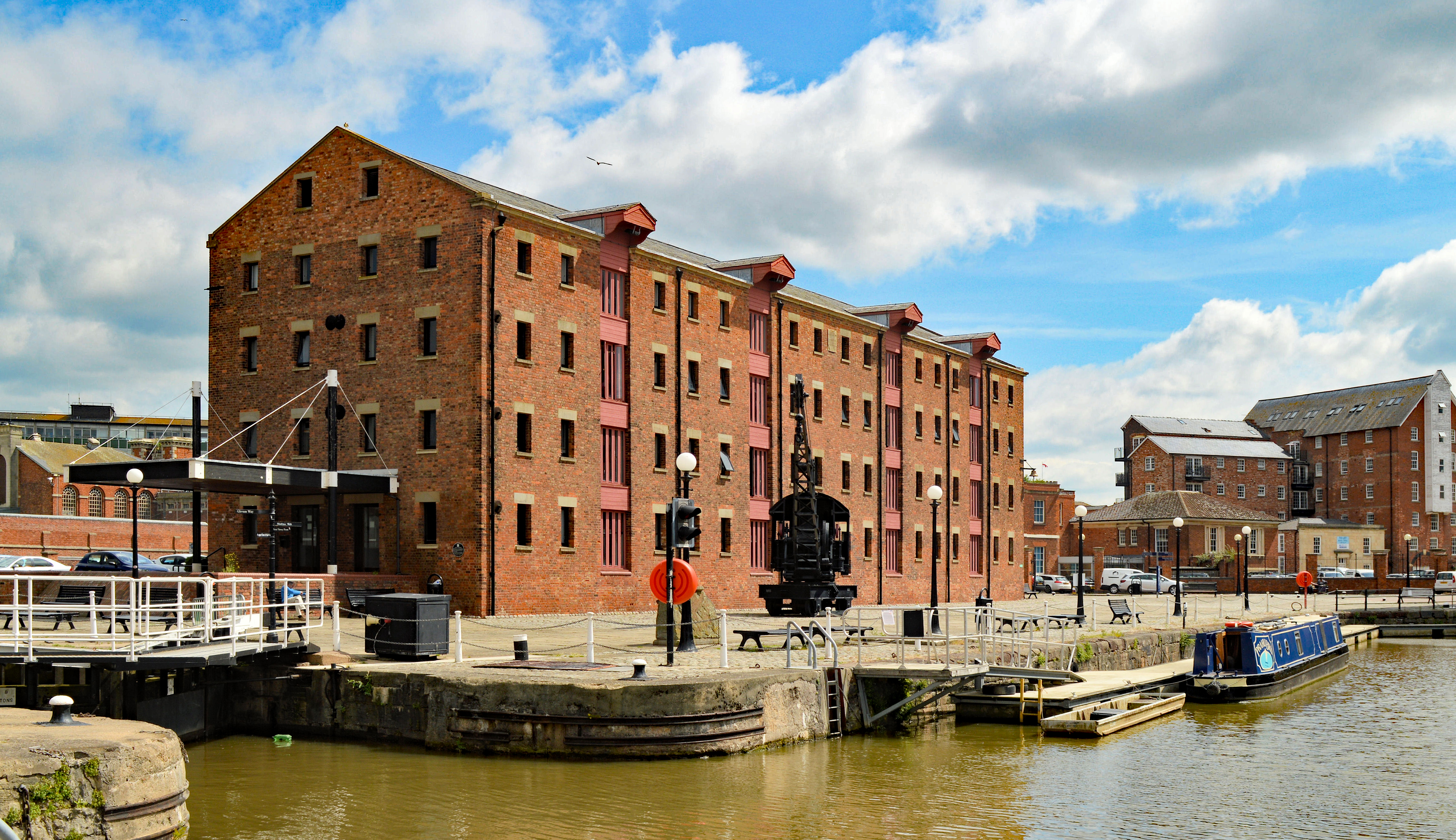
North Warehouse

In 1827, the company constructed the first warehouse on the north side of the basin for the storage of sacks of grain. Designed by Barton Haigh, architect, of Liverpool, this was a four-story building built of red brick under a slate roof. The floors were laid on wooden beams supported by cast iron pillars. A central loading bay on each floor faced the quay, above them was a hand-operated hoist in a projection from the roof. The North Warehouse, and the later West Warehouse, since demolished, were built parallel to the quays. Subsequently another fourteen grain warehouses were constructed between 1827 and 1873 by merchants, either for their own use or for letting out to others. They had to adhere to the company style for the most part though detail differences existed. They were generally five or six-stories high and, unlike the North Warehouse, they were built at right angles to the quays. The last and largest to be built was the Llanthony Warehouse, now home to the Gloucester Waterways Museum.

In the 1830s, further expansion of the dock facilities took place. In 1834, a pump house was built to pump water from the Severn to maintain the level in the docks and the canal. The dry dock was enlarged in 1837 and the same year a new quay on the east side of the initial part of the canal below the Llanthony road bridge was constructed. Known as Baker's Quay it featured the Pillar Warehouse (Note: Also known as the Pillar and Lucy warehouse) that was built parallel and right on the edge of the quay but with the ground floor cut back to allow passage along the quay itself and the front of the rest of the building carried on pillars over the quay. The main purpose of the quay was to provide storage yards for timber imports from North America and the Baltic.

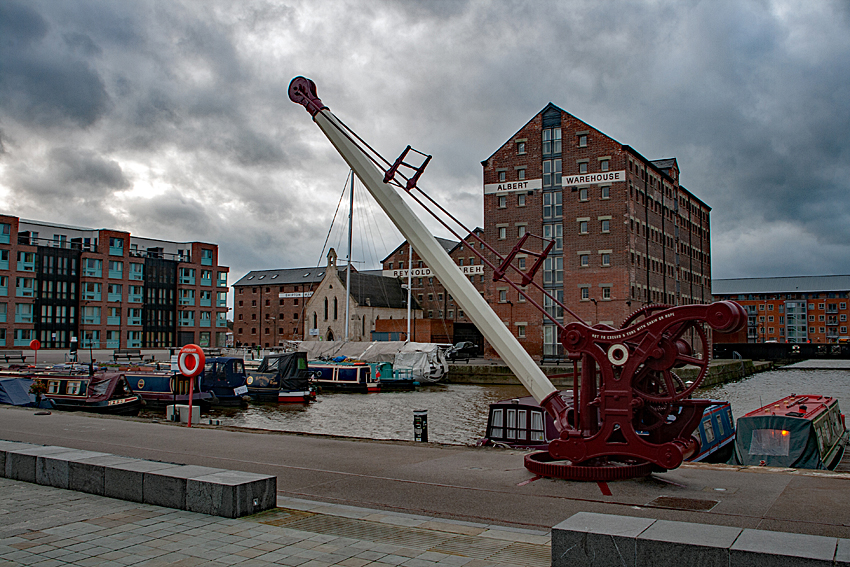
Victoria Basin

In 1846, in anticipation of an increase in grain imports following the repeal of the corn laws, three new warehouses were built on the east side of the main basin. (Note: The Herbert, Kimberley and Philpotts warehouses) In 1847, the Britannia Quay was constructed in the space between the barge arm and the Llanthony bridge. By 1849, the Victoria Dock had been constructed east of the main basin and north of the barge arm. It was known as the salt basin as this was where salt from Droitwich and Stoke Prior was loaded for shipment to Ireland, a trade that continued up till the 1940s. Two new warehouses were built on the west side of the basin, in 1849 and 1851, predictably named Victoria and Albert. The end of the decade saw the completion of the first manufacturing, as opposed to storage, facility in the docks with the opening in 1850 of the City Flour Mill (Note: Known as Pridays Mill) on Commercial Road which forms the northern border of the docks. In 1851 the stretch of the canal by Baker's Wharf was widened and the Llanthony Quay was constructed on the west bank. A second dry dock was opened in 1853. Situated to the south of the original dry dock, it was built by William Guest for the canal company to facilitate the repair of vessels involved in the export of coal from Gloucester.

In 1875, the opening of the new dock at Sharpness, which could handle larger vessels, led to a change in type of traffic arriving in the docks. Ships were now unloading their cargo in the new facilities and it was transferred to Gloucester Docks by barges. The last significant addition to the docks was the construction in 1892 of the Monk Meadow dock, on the west side of the canal below the Llanthony Quay, to provide additional space for the timber trade. A timber pond was added south of the dock in 1896, to store large baulks without them drying out and cracking.

=== The coming of the railways ===
The first railway to serve the docks was the Gloucester and Cheltenham Tramroad which opened on 4 June 1811. The purpose of the line was to transport coal and building materials to the developing spa town of Cheltenham. The line was a 3 ft 6 in (1,067 mm) gauge plateway, with cast iron rails on stone blocks, similar to the Surrey Iron Railway. Rolling stock consisted of trams hauled by horses. After the Birmingham and Gloucester Railway opened a dock at Baker's Quay, the tramroad was extended to the B&GR station on the opposite side of the city in 1841. In 1844, the route was adapted to serve standard gauge wagons as well as the trams. In 1848, the Midland Railway, which had taken over the B&GR, opened a branch line to the east side of the docks via High Orchard. In 1853, the Great Western Railway completed a branch line to sidings on the west side of the canal at Llanthony Quay.

=== Twenty-first century ===
Every year since 2007, Gloucester Docks has been home to the Tall Ships Festival.

In 2026 the dock filled almost completely with a silt, an ongoing problem as silt enters the canal from the River Severn as water is pumped from the canal to supply Bristol.

== The Mariners Chapel ==
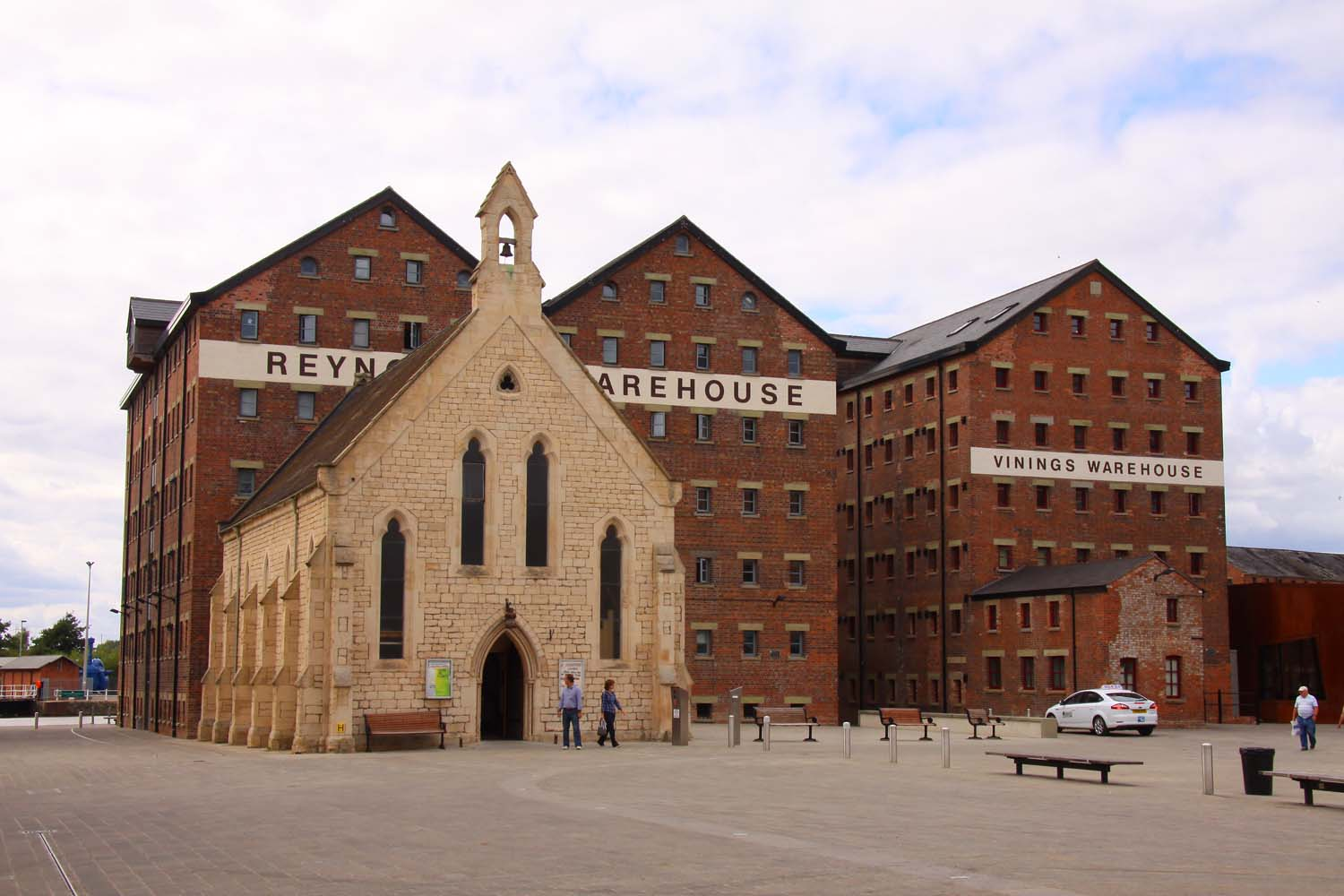
The Mariners' Chapel

In 1848, work started on a simple chapel, designed by John Jaques, a local architect. The chapel was dedicated, on 11 February 1849, to cater for the spiritual needs of dock-workers and seamen using the port. The building just consists of a nave and bell-tower. Owing to the proximity of Reynolds warehouse, the chancel is at the west end, rather than the conventional east end. The chapel is a Grade II listed building.

In 1884, an old cheese warehouse was acquired and converted into a meeting place and refreshment room. It was used as a school, teaching reading and writing to the largely illiterate dockyard workers and boating community.

== Ships ==
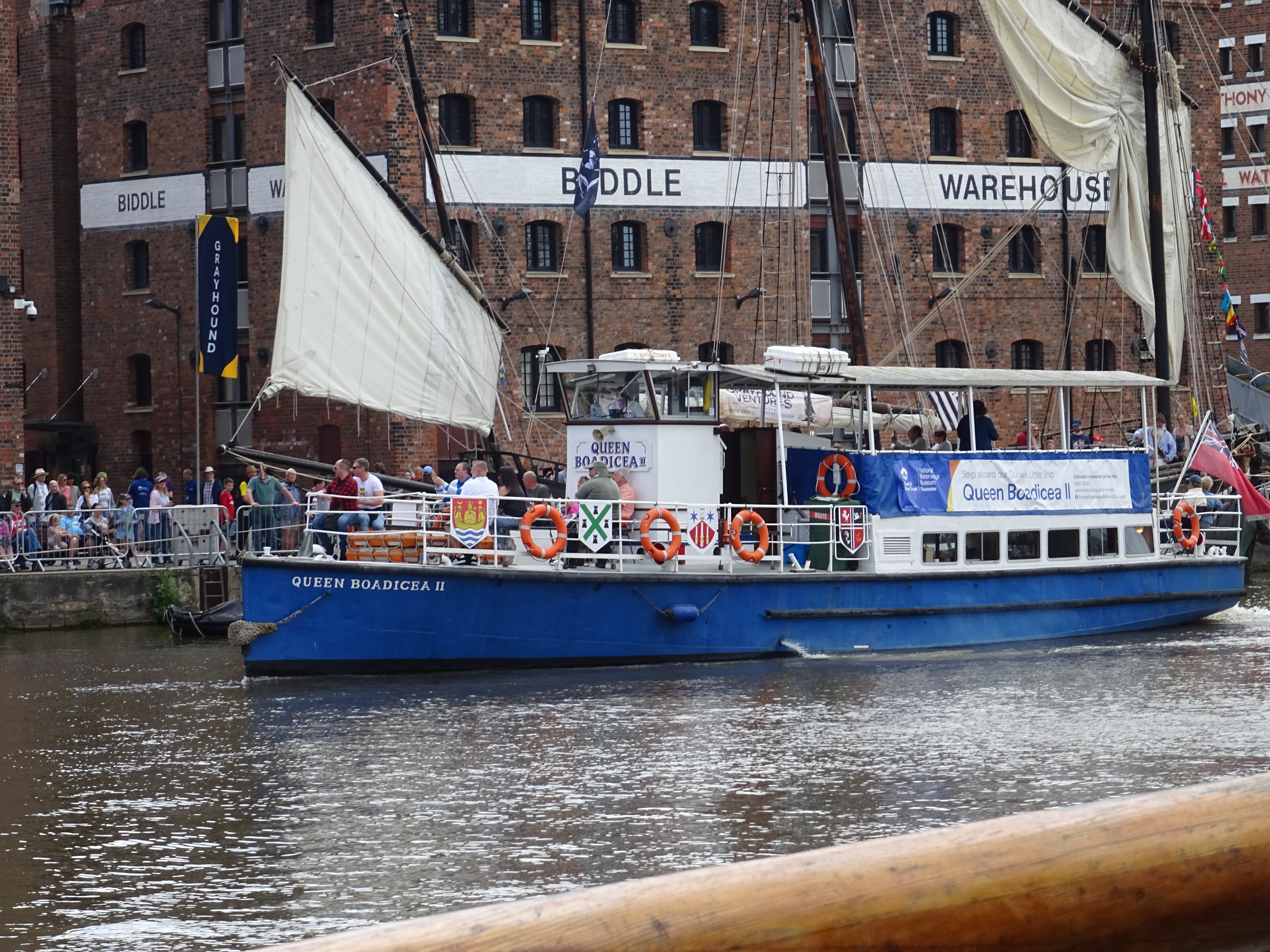
Queen Boadicea II

Historic vessels based at Gloucester Docks include:

- Queen Boadicea II, a steel hulled passenger ship, one of the Little Ships of Dunkirk.
- SD No 4, a Dutch built steam dredger used for dredging the basin and canal. Preserved in working order at the Waterways Museum.
- Severn Progress a tug built for the Severn & Canal Carrying Company. After a period working on the restoration of the Kennet and Avon Canal, she is now preserved in working order at the Waterways Museum.
- Sabrina No 5, an unpowered barge preserved by the Waterways Museum and adapted for use an education centre.
- Northwich, a horse drawn narrow boat from the Fellows Morton & Clayton fleet. Preserved at the Waterways Museum.
- LV 14 Sula, a 1958 lightvessel now preserved as holiday accommodation.
- Kathleen and May, the last working three-masted, wooden-hulled topsail schooner. Laid up in the docks awaiting restoration.

== Notable buildings and structures ==
=== Listed buildings ===
All the buildings in this list are Grade II listed by Historic England.

| Building | Date | Number | Notes |
|---|---|---|---|
| Gloucester Lock | 1799 | 1245604 | Built as double chambered lock, singled in 1892. |
| Small Dry Dock | 1818 | 1245601 | Enlarged in 1837, still used by a specialist ship-builder and restorer. |
| Lock House | 1826 | 1271746 | Lock keepers cottage. |
| North Warehouse | 1827 | 1245466 | Built by the canal company for storing corn. The basements were used as bonded storage for wine and spirits merchants. Now Gloucester City Council offices. |
| Biddle's Warehouse | 1830 | 1245597 | Bonded warehouse, now residential apartments. |
| Dock Company Office | 1831 | 1245599 | Canal and Dock companies offices. Offices of the BTC after 1947, the BWB after 1962, and the Canal and River Trust after 2012. |
| Shipton's Warehouse | 1833 | 1245468 | Corn warehouse, now residential apartments. |
| Lock Warehouse | 1834 | 1245608 | Bonded warehouse, now residential apartments. |
| Pillar and Lucy Warehouse | c. 1838 | 1271711 | Bonded warehouse. |
| Vining's Warehouse | 1840 | 1245471 | Also known as Reynold's Flour Mill. Now residential apartments. |
| Reynolds Warehouse | 1840 | 1245469 | Also known as Reynolds Double Warehouse or Sturge's Warehouse. Bonded warehouse, now residential apartments. |
| Sudbrooke House | c. 1840s | 1245763 | Timber merchants combined shop and offices, now a pub. |
| Custom House | 1845 | 1271653 | Built to handle the increase in foreign trade. Now the home of the Soldiers of Gloucestershire Museum. |
| Herbert Warehouse | 1846 | 1245605 | Built in anticipation of the repeal of the corn laws. Now Gloucester City Council offices. |
| Kimberley Warehouse | 1846 | 1245606 | Built in anticipation of the repeal of the corn laws. Now Gloucester City Council offices. |
| Philpotts Warehouse | 1846 | 1245467 | Built in anticipation of the repeal of the corn laws. Now Gloucester City Council offices. |
| 27 and 29 Commercial Road | 1848 | 1271652 | Offices for merchants with accommodation above. |
| Navigation House | 1848 | 1271651 | Ships' chandler's house, now offices |
| Mariner's Chapel | 1849 | 1245609 | Church of England extra parochial chapel. |
| Victoria Warehouse | 1849 | 1245470 | Bonded warehouse, now the offices of NHS Gloucestershire Shared Services. |
| City Flour Mills | 1850 | 1245598 | Known as Pridays Mill from 1881 till it ceased operation in 1994. Converted to apartments in 2004. |
| Albert Warehouse | 1851 | 1271791 | Bonded warehouse, later a flour mill. The first mill in the docks in which roller milling machinery was installed in 1882. Now residential apartments. |
| Bridge House | 1852 | 1245764 | Bridge keeper's house, replaced an earlier building demolished when the canal was widened. |
| Large Dry Dock | 1853 | 1245602 | Still used by a specialist ship-builder and restorer. |
| Llanthony Provender Mill | 1862 | 1271710 | Also known as Foster’s Oil and Cake Mill. Linseed and cotton seed was crushed to produce oil and the residue sold as animal feed. |
| Drinking Fountain | 1863 | 1245600 | Built by the Board of Health for the benefit of the dock workers. |
| Transit Shed | 1867 | 1271709 | Iron-framed shed built for the Midland Railway. |
| Alexandra Warehouse | 1870 | 1271792 | Bonded warehouse |
| Llanthony Warehouse | 1873 | 1245607 | A double corn warehouse. Converted in 1988 to house the Gloucester Waterways Museum. |
| Fox's Malthouse | 1888 | 1245603 | Operated in conjunction with the Alexandra Warehouse. Now a marina office. |
| Downing's Malthouse Extension | 1901 | 1271708 | An extension to the original malthouse. |

=== Other buildings ===
| Building | Notes |
|---|---|
| Merchant's Quay shopping centre | First significant new build. |
| Vining's Warehouse extension | Won an award in the best new building or extension category, Gloucester Civic Awards 2006. |
| Britannia Warehouse | Facsimile of original 1861 building destroyed by fire in 1987. |
| Albion Cottages | Early 19th century cottages acquired by the company in 1847. |
| Swing Bridge | Built across the access to the Victoria basin. |
| Warehouse 4 | Single story building rebuilt from the ground floor of the Great Western Warehouse, destroyed by fire in 1945. Now houses the Gloucester Brewery. |
| South Point & North Point | Residential apartment blocks built on the site of the 1830's West Warehouse, demolished in 1966. |
| Llanthony Bridge | Mechanised lift bridge that replaced an earlier swing bridge. |
| Barge Arm | Modern residential block. |
| Barge Arm East | Modern residential block. |
