= ITV Weekend News =

British TV news programme (since 1955)

- ITV News opening sequence
- Genre: National and International News
- Presented by: Various
- Voices of: Gayanne Potter (intro)
- Theme music composer: Dave Hewson
- Opening theme: "Global Broadcast"
- Country of origin: United Kingdom
- Original language: English

Production
- Production locations: ITN headquarters, London, England
- Editors: Rachel Corp (Editor, ITV News)
- Camera setup: Multi-camera
- Running time: 5–10 minutes (morning and lunchtime); 15–20 minutes (evening and late-night)
- Production company: ITN

Original release
- Network: ITV
- Release: 22 September 1955 – present

Related
- ITV Lunchtime News; ITV Evening News; ITV News at Ten

The ITV Weekend News is the national news bulletins on the British television network ITV at a weekend.

However it is often referred to in programme guides as ITV News (morning and late-night), ITV Lunchtime News (lunchtime) and ITV Evening News (evening) in line with the respective weekday bulletins. They are produced by ITV News/ITN.

== History ==
On 8 March 1999, ITN News (ITN News and Sport, ITN Evening News, the weekend edition of the ITN Early Evening News, ITN Late Evening News) was renamed under the umbrella name ITV Weekend News.

The four broadcasts which air morning, lunchtime, early evening and late-night feature British national and international news stories, as well as a round-up of the weekend's sports news. All bulletins, with the exception of the morning update, are followed by a national and regional ITV Weather forecast. The morning bulletin is on at 9:25am on Saturday and Sunday mornings.

The ITV Weekend News is presented by a pool of on air staff from across the ITV News portfolio.

The ITV Weekend News presenter also fronts the impending ITV News London evening bulletin only on Saturdays.

== On air staff ==
=== Present newscasters ===
- Sameena Ali-Khan (2006, 2021–)
- Yasmin Bodalbhai (2023–)
- Andrea Benfield (2010–)
- Cari Davies (2026–)
- Gamal Fahnbulleh (2021–)
- Charlotte Hawkins (2025–)
- Becky Jago (2026–)
- Sangita Lal (2026–)
- Lucrezia Millarini (2015–)
- Mary Nightingale (occasional host) (2001–2015, 2023–)
- Chris Ship (2009–)
- Geraint Vincent (2006–2012, 2021–)
- Lucy Watson (2021–)
- Romilly Weeks (2006–)

=== Former newscasters ===
- Fiona Armstrong (1985–1992)
- Pamela Armstrong (1982–1986)
- Anushka Asthana (2025)
- Mark Austin (1986–2015)
- Matt Barbet (2013–2014)
- Carol Barnes (1975–2001)
- Felicity Barr (2001–2005)
- Sally Biddulph (2009–2012)
- Reginald Bosanquet (1967–1978)
- Paul Brand (2021–2023)
- Alastair Burnet (1964–1991)
- Sue Carpenter (1988–1992)
- David Cass (1987–1988)
- Andrea Catherwood (1999–2006)
- Christopher Chataway (1955–1960)
- Robin Day (1956–1969)
- Katie Derham (1998–2010)
- Julie Etchingham (2009–2015)
- Anna Ford (1978–1980)
- Sandy Gall (1980–1992)
- Shiulie Ghosh (1998–2006)
- Duncan Golestani (2019–2026)
- Andrew Harvey (2000–2001)
- Jonathan Hill (2013–2020)
- Nina Hossain (2004–2015)
- Natasha Kaplinsky (2011–2015)
- Shehab Khan (2023–2026)
- Martyn Lewis (1980–1986)
- James Mates (2002–2021)
- Daisy McAndrew (2006–2011)
- Trevor McDonald (1980–2003)
- Lucy Meacock (2007–2009, 2011–2015)
- Graham Miller (1993–2001)
- Dermot Murnaghan (1991–2001)
- Bill Neely (2002–2006)
- Rageh Omaar (2013–2024)
- Lucy Owen (2004–2007)
- Nicholas Owen (1987–2006)
- Leonard Parkin (1976–1987)
- Kylie Pentelow (2014–2023)
- Steve Scott (2005–2015)
- Ranvir Singh (2014–2016)
- Peter Sissons (1965–1982)
- Jon Snow (1980–1987)
- Julia Somerville (1984–1985)
- Alastair Stewart (1981–1992, 2003–2020)
- John Suchet (1980–2004)
- Huw Thomas (1960–1964)
- Owen Thomas (1993–2003)
- Jeremy Thompson (1983–1988)
- Denis Tuohy (1994–1999)
- Mark Webster (2002–2004)
- Charlene White (2014–2019)
- Kirsty Young (1999-2001)
