= ITV News at 10.30 =

- ITV News opening sequence
- Also known as: ITV News at Ten-Thirty
- Genre: News; Current affairs
- Presented by: Trevor McDonald (2004–2005); Mark Austin (2004–2008)
- Theme music composer: Dave Hewson
- Opening theme: "Global Headlines"
- Country of origin: United Kingdom
- Original language: English

Production
- Production locations: ITN Studios, London, England, UK
- Editor: Deborah Turness
- Camera setup: Multi-camera
- Running time: 30 minutes
- Production company: ITV News/ITN

Original release
- Network: ITV
- Release: 2 February 2004 – 10 January 2008

Related
- ITV News at Ten; ITV Nightly News

The ITV News at 10.30 is a flagship news programme on British television network ITV, broadcast on Monday to Friday at 10:30pm, between 2 February 2004 and 10 January 2008. It was produced by ITN. It was introduced into the ITV schedule as the ITV News at Ten-Thirty on 2 February 2004, following the demise of the ITV Nightly News.

The bulletin was a twenty-five-minute broadcast of British national and international news, with a dedicated business, sports, and a review of the following morning' newspaper front pages. It was followed by a five-minute round-up of news from the ITV regions around the United Kingdom.

The programme was broadcast for the final time in the 10:30pm timeslot on Thursday 10 January 2008, with News at Ten relaunching the following Monday.

On Monday 27 February 2017, News at Ten moved to 10:30pm (as "ITV News") for eight consecutive weeks to make way for new entertainment programme The Nightly Show. The Nightly Show finished on 21 April 2017 and ITV News at Ten returned to its usual time of 10:00pm from 24 April 2017.

In the late 1990s and early 2000s, News at Ten would often air at 10:30pm instead of 10pm just so films could air all the way through without news cutting in.

== Overview ==
The newscast's clock ident.

Unlike its predecessors (ITV Nightly News, the first two incarnations of ITV News at Ten and ITV Weekend News), the programme ran at its regular time of 10:30pm every weeknight. Its main rival was the BBC Ten O'Clock News on BBC One, which consistently beat it in the ratings and was broadcast half an hour before it. Its other main rival was the BBC's other flagship evening news programme, Newsnight, on BBC Two.

On Wednesday 31 October 2007, it was confirmed that ITV was planning to bring back News at Ten, with the presenter Trevor McDonald and former Sky News presenter Julie Etchingham.

== Presenters ==
Lead presenters
Year	Presenter	Notes
2004–2008	Mark Austin	Deputy presenter (2004–2005)
2004–2005	Trevor McDonald	

Relief presenters
Year	Presenter	Notes
2004–2005	Katie Derham	
2004–2008	James Mates	Deputy presenter (2006–2008)
2004–2008	Mary Nightingale	
2004–2008	Alastair Stewart	
2004	John Suchet	Deputy presenter (2004)

Sports presenters
Year	Presenter	Notes
2004–2006	Felicity Barr	
2004–2008	Nina Hossain	
2004–2006	Steve Scott	
2004–2007	Jonathan Wills	

Preceded by BBC Ten O'Clock News: March into Kabul	RTS: Television Journalism; News - International (The Beslan Siege); 2005	Succeeded by ITV News: Welcome To Baghdad
