= ITV News at Ten =

British TV evening news programme (since 1967)

- Title card used since 2016
- Also known as: News at Ten
- Genre: News and Current affairs
- Presented by: Julie Etchingham; Tom Bradby
- Voices of: Gayanne Potter (intro)
- Theme music composer: Johnny Pearson; Dave Hewson
- Opening theme: "Global Broadcast"
- Country of origin: United Kingdom
- Original language: English

Production
- Production locations: ITN headquarters, London, England
- Editors: Laura Wilshaw (Programme Editor); Rachel Corp (Editor, ITV News)
- Camera setup: Multi-camera
- Running time: 30 minutes
- Production company: ITN

Original release
- Network: ITV
- Release: 3 July 1967 – 5 March 1999
- Release: 22 January 2001 – 30 January 2004
- Release: 14 January 2008 – present

Related
- ITV News at 10.30; ITV Lunchtime News; ITV Evening News; ITV Weekend News

ITV News at Ten (or more commonly News at Ten) is the flagship evening news programme on British television network ITV, produced by ITN and founded by news editor Geoffrey Cox on 3 July 1967. The bulletin was the first permanent 30-minute news broadcast in the United Kingdom, and although initially scheduled for only thirteen weeks due to fears that its length would turn viewers off, the bulletin proved to be highly popular with audiences and became a fixture of the ITV schedule.

News at Ten rose to popularity for its winning combination of in-depth, analytical news coverage and populist stories, as well as for its use of Big Ben's chimes to separate news headlines in its opening sequence. It simultaneously helped popularise newscasters such as Alastair Burnet, Andrew Gardner, Reginald Bosanquet, Sandy Gall, Anna Ford, John Suchet, Mark Austin, Alastair Stewart and Trevor McDonald into well-known television personalities.

When the bulletin was axed in 1999 in order for primetime entertainment programming to air uninterrupted, there was a public outcry. ITV reluctantly brought the programme back – under the name ITV News at Ten – in 2001, airing it at 10 pm for a minimum of three nights per week, but eventually replaced it with the ITV News at 10.30 in 2004. It was not until January 2008 that News at Ten was reinstated to the ITV schedule. The programme has been anchored by Tom Bradby since 2015.

== History ==
=== 1967 to 1999: the original run ===
ITN had been ITV's news provider since the channel's launch in September 1955. News updates from ITN tended to run 14 minutes in length at most, with no fixed broadcast time. BBC News was far better-funded; ITN only had one overseas reporter in Washington DC.

From his arrival in 1956, ITN editor Geoffrey Cox consistently argued to the Independent Television Authority that ITN should be providing at least one news bulletin of substantial length, in order to cover and analyse major news stories more closely. ITV argued against the idea of a 30-minute evening bulletin, insisting a news programme of such length would eat into its primetime entertainment schedule and turn viewers away from the channel, but the ITA granted Cox's wish in 1967. ITV stations reluctantly agreed to give the proposed bulletin – a Monday-to-Friday programme, fixed at 10 pm – a 13-week trial run to test its success.

A still from a News at Ten opening sequence from its launch.

News at Ten began broadcasting on 3 July 1967 under the editorship of Cox, who stipulated that the aim of the new programme was to "remove the spin and bring facts and the news as it really was". ITV's stance was seemingly confirmed early; the programme had little news to cover in its first few editions, having launched in the middle of summer during a slow news week. However, a reversal of fortunes quickly took place after an "action story" from ITN reporter Alan Hart on Colonel Colin Mitchell's Argyll and Sutherland Highlanders re-entering Crater, which ran for a then-unheard-of length of 5 minutes. A series of similar in-depth reports eventually helped to give News at Ten a regular viewership of seven million every night, forcing ITV to keep the programme. By 1969, News at Ten had become the first news bulletin in Britain to enter the top 20 most-watched programmes of the week; each week one or two episodes were among the top ten most popular. News at Ten was tied with Coronation Street as the second most popular television show for the week of 27 September 1970 with 6.90 million viewing homes, behind Special Branch.

The arrival of the new 30-minute programme allowed ITN to give a more in-depth and detailed treatment of serious news for the first time on British television, as well as coverage of populist stories and issues that would attract the viewing audience. The programme built on these concepts by introducing reporter packages, not the norm then but now a staple of television news, and a team of two newscasters taking turns to read stories instead of a sole presenter: a two-man team would inject personality into television news, as well as allow breaking news to be handed to the newscaster not in vision. The original newscasting team included Alastair Burnet, Andrew Gardner, Reginald Bosanquet, George Ffitch and Leonard Parkin. News at Ten also employed several other distinctive features which proved popular with viewers: the use of Big Ben's chimes (or "bongs") to separate the news headlines being read in the opening sequence, and the "… And Finally" report – a quirky and often humorous end piece designed to send the viewing audience to bed "on a high note" after 30 minutes of hard news coverage.

News at Ten developed a solid reputation for its extensive coverage of international news stories. Foreign correspondent Sandy Gall, the first ITN journalist to cover the start of the Vietnam War in 1965, returned there on several occasions to produce reports for News at Ten until he was forcibly removed from the country following the Fall of Saigon in 1975. Michael Nicholson reported in-depth on the 1976 Soweto uprising for News at Ten, and later went on to cover the Falklands War in 1982, after which he was awarded the South Atlantic Medal for his work. News at Ten, by now the UK's most popular news programme, ultimately forced the BBC to follow ITN's lead and extend its own programming to match, although Lord Annan declared in his 1977 Committee into the Future of Broadcasting, "We subscribe to the generally held view that ITN has the edge over BBC News."

In the absence of Alastair Burnet (who left ITN in 1972 to pursue a career in print journalism), News at Ten paired Andrew Gardner and Reginald Bosanquet to create one of the programme's most well-liked newscasting duos. In 1978, Anna Ford became the bulletin's first female newscaster, and Alastair Burnet rejoined the programme in the same year. For more than a decade onwards, Burnet was the newscaster most associated with News at Ten, his "serious persona", "sepulchral tones" and "deferential interviewing style" becoming respected hallmarks of the programme. By the late 1980s, Burnet – now a member of the ITN board of directors and News at Ten's associate editor – began to draw criticism that he was losing the personal touch with his audience, allowing News at Ten to settle into a "stodgy" and "old-fashioned" complacency. Nonetheless, the programme continued to maintain a solid high audience during the 1980s and well into the next decade.

The development of satellite technology in the 1980s allowed News at Ten to broadcast live from several locations around the world, including the Great Wall of China during a visit from the Queen in 1986. Alastair Burnet presented News at Ten from the United States during several presidential campaigns, as well as the 1984 conventions of the Republican and Democratic parties. Alastair Stewart presented News at Ten live from Saudi Arabia, the fall of the Berlin Wall in 1989 and the liberated Kuwait City during the 1991 Gulf War.

Burnet retired from ITN in 1991 after several clashes with the ITV companies over the future of the news organisation. In November 1992, News at Ten was given its first major relaunch, in part to address the criticism it had attracted over the last few years. In a bid to regain the personal touch that had been lost, the programme dispensed with the dual-presentation team in favour of a sole newscaster, Trevor McDonald, who subsequently became one of the most well-known newscasters in the UK. Julia Somerville, John Suchet and Dermot Murnaghan each presented News at Ten when McDonald was absent. The bulletin carried this format until March 1999.

Despite News at Ten's continued stature and popularity, ITV announced its intention to axe the bulletin in 1993, proposing two new peak-time bulletins at 6:30 pm and 11 pm. ITV justified the move as a measure to stem the decline in television viewing audiences and to allow the uninterrupted broadcast of movies, dramas and other entertainment programmes, but the plans were met with widespread criticism from viewers, several Members of Parliament, the then-Prime Minister John Major and the National Heritage Committee. The Independent Television Commission (ITC) ruled that ITV had not established a solid case for the removal of News at Ten, pointing to BBC News having experienced a larger viewing decline than ITN, but were restructuring the contents of their news programmes rather than move them to different timeslots. The proposals were eventually withdrawn after the ITC threatened ITV with legal action.

With the impending end of the bulletin and move to 11pm (see below), proposals included a 60-second bulletin at 10pm on the main ITV channel and a move of the 10pm bulletin to the upcoming ITV2 channel.

=== 1999 to 2008: axing and the News at When? era ===
In September 1998, following intense lobbying from the ITV companies, the ITC finally reviewed plans for a new weekday primetime ITV schedule that saw the removal of News at Ten (and the 5:40 pm Early Evening News) in favour of new 12:30 pm, 6:30 pm, and 11:00 pm news bulletins. The ITC undertook extensive audience research which found that the public preferred News at Ten to stay by a proportion of 5 to 3, but nonetheless granted ITV permission to axe News at Ten for a one-year trial period. The programme's demise in March 1999 coincided with an overhaul of news on ITV, which continued to be produced by ITN, but now branded on screen as ITV News. Trevor McDonald presented the new flagship ITV Evening News at 6:30 pm, a one-minute news summary was broadcast at 10 pm, and this was followed by the 30-minute ultimately resulted in a 13.9% decline in overall viewing figures for ITV News. In 2000, the ITC ordered ITV to reinstate News at Ten to stem the ratings decline. The BBC then decided to cash in on the move by shifting its own long-running Nine O'Clock News to 10 pm. McDonald returned to front the retitled ITV News at Ten in 2001, with a dual-presenting team of Dermot Murnaghan and Mary Nightingale replacing McDonald on the ITV Evening News. However, the haphazard scheduling of the revived 10 pm bulletin ultimately led to its downfall. While the BBC's Ten O'Clock News was fixed at 10 pm for six nights a week, the ITV News at Ten was broadcast for only three nights a week, allowing entertainment programmes to be broadcast past 10 pm for the rest of the week. In addition, the programme was often delayed by overrunning entertainment programmes on the nights that it was scheduled for 10 pm. This inconsistency led to the bulletin being unceremoniously dubbed News at When?

In 2003, ITV received approval from the ITC to axe the programme and replace it with the ITV News at 10:30, fixed at that time every weeknight. McDonald presented this bulletin from its launch on 2 February 2004 until his retirement on 15 December 2005. Mark Austin became the programme's main host from January 2006.

=== 2008 to 2015: reinstatement to ITV schedules ===
In October 2007, ITV chairman Michael Grade announced the return of News at Ten, following comments he made in March that the original removal of the programme was "a shocking mistake [that] damaged ITV more than anything else." The bulletin returned with its original name on 14 January 2008, broadcast from Monday to Thursday at 10 pm, with an 11 pm bulletin titled The Late News airing on Friday evenings. The revived News at Ten saw the reintroduction of the dual-newscaster team, pairing new presenter Julie Etchingham with Trevor McDonald, who had temporarily come out of retirement. Etchingham and Mark Austin presented The Late News. In March 2009, The Late News was dropped in order for News at Ten to return to its traditional Monday-to-Friday 10 pm slot, giving the programme a "consistent home at the heart of the schedule".

In October 2008, it was announced that McDonald would finally retire from News at Ten in November after hosting the programme's special US election coverage from Washington and was replaced by Mark Austin that same month. Austin presented the ITV News at 6:30 simultaneously until he was replaced on that programme by Alastair Stewart.

News at Ten struggled to regain its high viewing figures following several years out of the 10 pm timeslot, its 2008 return watched by 3.8 million viewers in comparison to 4.9m for the BBC. However, the bulletin occasionally beat the BBC News at 10 in the ratings: an overrunning football match on BBC One helped deliver ITV 4.3m at 10 pm; severe weather conditions on 2 February 2009 saw terrestrial TV news bulletins receive a boost in ratings and News at Ten was watched by 4.8m; and a week of special Britain's Got Talent semi-final programmes in May 2009 saw News at Ten beat the BBC with figures of 6.1m (26 May) and 6.4m (28 May), the latter being the programme's highest audience figure since 2003.

In November 2009, the famous Big Ben clock tower was removed from the programme's opening credits after concerns it alienated viewers outside London, but was ultimately reinstated to News at Ten's opening sequence following a further ITV relaunch in January 2013. Between November 2009 and January 2016, the bulletin was known as ITV News at Ten, but known on screen as simply ITV News.

=== 2015–present: refocus on reputation ===
As part of a move to enhance the reputation of ITV's news and current affairs output, News at Ten was restructured and redeveloped across a number of months: the new format launched in October 2015, placing more emphasis on analysis, context and a more "conversational" presentation style under new presenter Tom Bradby, former ITV News political editor; then the appointments of former BBC News journalists Robert Peston (as political editor) and Allegra Stratton (as national editor), who both reiterated in the press ITV's newfound intention to challenge the dominance of BBC News; and a refreshed set and opening title sequence in January 2016, which saw the reinstatement of the News at Ten name on screen.

In November 2015, it was reported that tension had developed between senior figures at the BBC and ITV following comments made about the viewing figures for both 10 pm news bulletins: prior to the News at Ten relaunch, Bradby commented on the powerful nature of BBC News during an interview with The Telegraph, saying that the scheduling of BBC One's 10 pm news against ITV's News at Ten was not in the public interest and that the corporation should "mount a strategic retreat". The BBC's Huw Edwards posted on Facebook that ITV should end its "creative handling of audience figures". A senior ITV News executive said to The Guardian that the BBC's attitude "is such [that] they are trying to smash and crush us" and that the corporation's "arrogance has got to such a level." Nigel Dacre, editor of ITV News between 1995 and 2001, criticised the channel's use of "junction management", which involves the deliberate overrunning of the 9 pm programme so that viewing figures for News at Ten are inflated.

As an experiment to try and boost ITV's viewing figures at the 10 pm slot, on Monday 27 February 2017, News at Ten moved to 10:30 pm for eight consecutive weeks to make way for new entertainment programme The Nightly Show. The bulletin returned to its original 10 pm time slot from 24 April 2017.

For a number of weeks in the run-up to the 2017 general election News at Ten was extended by 15 minutes, pushing the late regional news to 10:45 pm.

On 3 January 2018, a fire alarm forced ITV News staff to evacuate the building during the live broadcast of News at Ten. By the time crew members were allowed into the studio, the following programme was already on air.

On 26 April 2024, presenter Rageh Omaar became unwell whilst the programme was on air. Omaar could be heard stumbling over and slurring his words, sparking viewer concern for his wellbeing. Omaar received medical care in hospital thereafter, before being discharged to complete his recovery at home. The planned rerun of this bulletin on time-shift channels ITV1 +1 and STV +1 was pulled from broadcast.

== Theme music and opening sequence ==
News at Ten is famed for its use of the Big Ben clockface, the headline "bongs" and the dramatic and familiar theme music, all retained and reworked into various guises across five decades.

From 1967 to 1992, its opening and closing themes were straightforward excerpts from The Awakening, a piece of library music composed by Johnny Pearson. In 1992, composer Dave Hewson was appointed to produce a new arrangement of The Awakening. Since March 1995, Hewson has produced several rearrangements of the famous theme for all ITV News programmes.

The story of the adaptation of The Awakening was featured in an official TV tie-in book, although incorrectly referring to the title music as Arabesque:

The tune is called Arabesque and was written by Johnny Pearson, who went on to write many other television theme tunes. The decision to use it was taken only at the last minute and after the first week it was nearly dropped. Viewers were complaining it was too harsh. A composer from Disney was called in during the first week to write a new theme tune. But an ITN sound mixer called Alfie Wilson wanted to stick with the old tune. He took the original recording of Arabesque to a nearby music studio and got it remixed—smoothing out some of the strident tones of the original. By the second Monday of News at Ten there was still no decision on which piece of music to use. Just before the programme started, editor Geoffrey Cox said, "Let's go with what we've got for the time being." Alfie played his remixed version on air and that's the one that was played five nights a week until a new arrangement of Arabesque was created for the revamp in 1992.

— News at Ten: A Celebration, 1999

The most memorable series of News at Ten title sequences launched in 1969: a camera pan across the Houses of Parliament and up the Westminster Clock Tower, followed by a sharp zoom into the tower clockface and the programme's name appearing on screen in time to the strident beats of The Awakening, with the headline "bongs" playing directly afterwards. (If the bulletin started significantly after 10 pm, the "bongs" were dispensed with.) Further refreshes of the opening sequence continued to use this basic concept for several years afterwards, even after the introduction of computer-generated titles in 1988, which incorporated a virtual flyover over nighttime London. As part of the programme's 1992 revamp, the familiar sequence was replaced by simple camera shots of the clock tower and ITN's headquarters. (However, a shot of the headquarters was replaced by a single shot of the studio in 1994.) In 2008, News at Ten reworked its 1988 flyover sequence and original theme tune (which combines elements of both it and the 1992 theme tune) for its relaunch. The programme used the same opening titles as other ITV News bulletins from 2001 to 2004 and again from 2009 to 2016, all loosely based on elements established by News at Ten title sequences from its early days. In 2016, a new title sequence was introduced, focusing more closely on the traditional image of the Big Ben clockface, with the music Global Broadcast (originally used for ITV News bulletins since 2013) is re-orchestrated.

== Awards ==
News at Ten won its first award from the National Viewers and Listeners Association in August 1968. The programme has been honoured over the years by the prestigious RTS Television Journalism Awards, including the News – International coverage award in 1997 and the coveted News Programme of the Year in 1998, 2010, 2014 and 2021.

The programme has received the BAFTA News Coverage award twice: in 2009 for their coverage of the 2008 Sichuan earthquake; and in 2010 for the 2010 Haiti earthquake.

News at Ten has also won awards in the television/news programme categories at the International Emmy awards (2009) and the Plain English Awards (2010).

== On air staff ==
=== Lead newscaster ===
- Tom Bradby (2015–)

=== Deputy newscaster ===
- Julie Etchingham (2015–); lead newscaster (2008–2015)

=== Other newscasters ===
- Paul Brand (2023–)
- Gamal Fahnbulleh (2023–)
- Nina Hossain (2009–)
- Lucrezia Millarini (2021–)
- Chris Ship (2022–)
- Geraint Vincent (2012, 2024–)
- Romilly Weeks (2010–)
- Charlene White (2014–2015, 2020–)
- Charlotte Hawkins (2026–)

=== Former newscasters ===
- Pamela Armstrong (1984–1986)
- Mark Austin (2002–2004, 2008–2015)
- Carol Barnes (1985–1992)
- Reginald Bosanquet (1967–1979)
- Alastair Burnet (1967–1972, 1978–1991)
- Andrea Byrne (2011–2012)
- Katie Derham (2001–2004, 2008–2010)
- George Ffitch (1967–1968)
- Anna Ford (1978–1981)
- Sandy Gall (1972–1991)
- Andrew Gardner (1967–1977)
- Gordon Honeycombe (1967–1982)
- Natasha Kaplinsky (2011–2015)
- Martyn Lewis (1980–1986)
- James Mates (2008–2015)
- Trevor McDonald (1982, 1989–1999, 2001–2004, 2008)
- Graham Miller (weekend sport) (1993–1999)
- Dermot Murnaghan (1993–1999; 2001–2002)
- Mary Nightingale (2008–2015)
- Rageh Omaar (2015–2024)
- Nicholas Owen (1989-1991, 2001–2004)
- Leonard Parkin (1968–1976)
- Selina Scott (1980–1982)
- Ranvir Singh (2014–2015, 2020)
- Julia Somerville (1988–1999)
- Alastair Stewart (1986–1992, 2009–2020)
- John Suchet (1989–1999, 2001–2004)
- Kirsty Young (2001)

== See also ==
- BBC News at Ten

Preceded by N/A	RTS: Television Journalism; News – International (Plight of Romania's Children); 1998	Succeeded by Tonight with Trevor McDonald
Preceded by Channel 5 News	RTS: Television Journalism; News Programme of the Year; 1999	Succeeded by Channel 4 News
Preceded by BBC News at Ten	RTS: Television Journalism; News Programme of the Year; 2010	Succeeded by Newsnight
Preceded by Channel 4 News	RTS: Television Journalism; News Programme of the Year; 2014	Succeeded by Sky News at Five
Preceded by Newsnight	RTS: Television Journalism; News Programme of the Year; 2021 & 2022	Succeeded by Incumbent
Preceded by Al Jazeera	RTS: Television Journalism; Breaking News (Storming of the Capitol); 2022	Succeeded by Incumbent
Preceded by BBC Breakfast	RTS: Television Journalism; Scoop of the Year (Storming of the Capitol); 2022	Succeeded by Incumbent
Preceded by Sky News	RTS: Television Journalism; News – International (Storming of the Capitol); 2022	Succeeded by Incumbent
