= ITV Nightly News =

- ITV Nightly News opening sequence
- Genre: News
- Presented by: Dermot Murnaghan
- Voices of: Andrew Burt (intro)
- Theme music composer: Dave Hewson
- Opening theme: "Breaking News"
- Country of origin: United Kingdom
- Original language: English

Production
- Producer: ITV News/ITN
- Production locations: ITN headquarters, London, England, UK
- Camera setup: Multi-camera
- Running time: 20 minutes
- Production company: ITV News/ITN

Original release
- Network: ITV
- Release: 8 March 1999 – 19 January 2001

Related
- ITV News at Ten; ITV News at 10.30

The ITV Nightly News is the former nightly news programme on British television network ITV, produced by ITN and broadcast Monday to Friday at 11:00pm. The 20-minute bulletin, originally presented by Dermot Murnaghan, was introduced as part of a major overhaul of news on ITV that saw its 5:40pm Early Evening News and prestigious News at Ten programmes axed.

These changes proved to be extremely unpopular with viewers and viewing figures declined. The ITV Nightly News was axed after less than two years and replaced by a reintroduced ITV News at Ten in order to halt the ratings loss. The revived 10:00pm bulletin followed the same 20-minute format as the ITV Nightly News, and although initially successful, eventually faltered in the ratings due to haphazard scheduling and delayed start times. The ITV News at Ten was replaced on 2 February 2004 by the ITV News at 10.30. On 14 January 2008, The Late News was reinstated to the ITV schedules on Fridays only, with News at Ten reinstated Mondays to Thursdays, but this only lasted until March 2009, when it was axed in favour of News at Ten airing five nights per week.

== Presenters ==
Lead presenter
Year	Presenter
1999–2001	Dermot Murnaghan

Relief presenters
Year	Presenter
1999–2001	Mark Austin
1999–2001	Andrea Catherwood
1999–2001	Katie Derham
1999–2001	Trevor McDonald
1999–2001	Mary Nightingale
1999–2001	Nicholas Owen
1999–2001	John Suchet
1999–2001	Kirsty Young
