= Alastair Stewart =

English journalist and newscaster (born 1952)

Alastair Stewart OBE
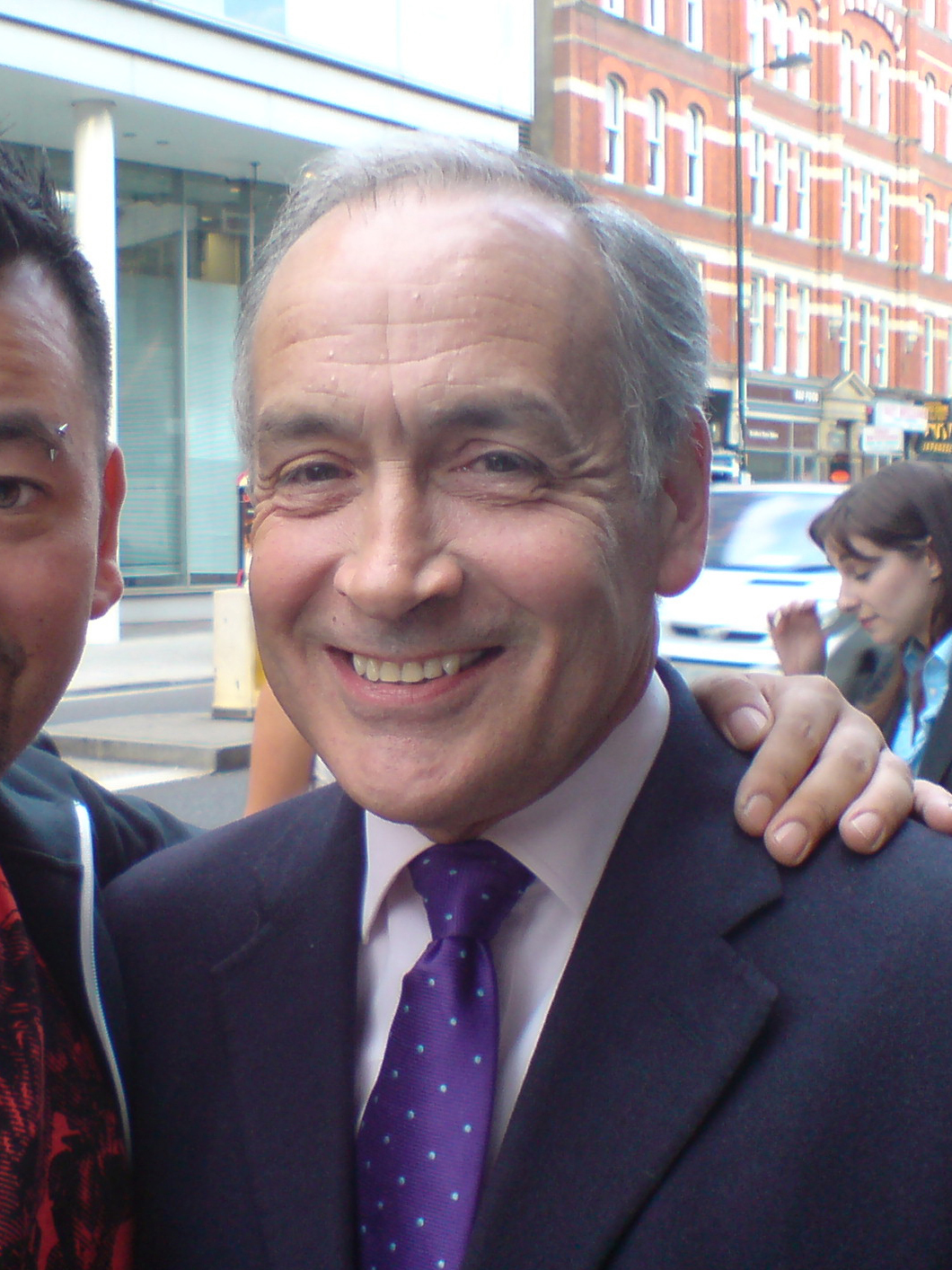
- Stewart in 2007
- Born: Alastair James Stewart; 22 June 1952 (age 74); Emsworth, Hampshire, England
- Education: University of Bristol (BSc)
- Occupations: Journalist; presenter
- Years active: 1976–2023
- Notable credit(s): ITN (1980–1992, 2003–2020); LNN (1993–2004); GB News (2021–2023)
- Spouse: Sally Ann Jung (m. 1978)
- Children: 4

Alastair James Stewart OBE (born 22 June 1952) is a retired English journalist and newscaster.

Stewart joined Southern Television in 1976, then joined ITN in 1980, where he served three years with Channel 4 News and went on to become a main newsreader with ITV News. He remained in this role for more than 35 years, making him the longest-serving male newsreader on British television, having worked in both local and national news for 44 years. As a presenter for ITV News, he won the Royal Television Society's News Presenter of the Year award in 2004 and 2005.

In January 2020, he stepped down as an ITV News presenter and joined GB News on its introduction in 2021. In March 2023, he announced his retirement as a regular broadcaster.

== Early life ==
Stewart was born in Emsworth, Hampshire to a Scottish father from Invergarry and an English mother. His father served as an officer in the Royal Air Force.

Stewart was educated in Scotland, at the state school Madras College in St Andrews, Fife, then in England at the independent school Salesian College in Farnborough, Hampshire and at St. Augustine's Abbey School in Ramsgate, Kent. He then read Economics and Politics at the University of Bristol, and worked for the National Union of Students from 1974 to 1976.

== Career ==
=== 1970s ===
Stewart's career in television started in 1976 with ITV's south of England company Southern Television in Southampton. He was a reporter, industrial correspondent, presenter and documentary maker. He recorded one of the last interviews with Lord Mountbatten before Mountbatten was assassinated by the IRA in 1979, and spent six weeks in Ford Open Prison to make a half-hour documentary.

=== 1980s ===
He joined ITN in 1980 as industrial correspondent, soon joining its roster of additional newsreaders. From 1983 to 1986, he was a presenter and reporter with ITN's Channel 4 News, and also presented ITN's News at 5.45.

Stewart provided live coverage of the Space Shuttle Challenger disaster as the details of the tragedy unfolded. A two-minute newsflash became an unscripted, one-hour special programme. He also anchored, with Sandy Gall, the award-winning coverage on ITN on the night of the bombing of the Pan Am jet over Lockerbie and presented the ITV network coverage of the memorial service for the victims.

He moved again in May 1989, to ITN's flagship News at Ten bulletin, which he anchored live from the fall of the Berlin Wall, before spending a year in the United States as ITN's Washington correspondent. Four days after returning from his assignment in Washington he was sent to Dhahran, Saudi Arabia, to anchor ITN's coverage of the Gulf War. He presented News at Ten, live from Saudi Arabia for two months. At the end of February, Stewart became the first British television reporter to broadcast live from the liberated Kuwait City. He presented News at Ten from Kuwait for a week before returning to the UK.

=== 1990s ===
ITN's network coverage of the 1992 Budget saw the ninth year of Stewart's involvement in the presentation of the annual event for ITV. It was his fifth year anchoring the programme having replaced Sir Alastair Burnet, who retired from ITN in 1991.

During his time with ITN, he also provided the commentary for many of its other special programmes on the ITV network including the State Openings of Parliament, numerous by-elections, state visits and for the royal weddings of Charles, Prince of Wales and Lady Diana Spencer and Prince Andrew and Sarah Ferguson.

From 1993 to September 2009, he was the co-presenter of ITV London's regional news programme London Tonight.

He has also presented Alastair Stewart's Sunday for BBC Radio 5 in 1994. Then in 1995, he joined GMTV, where he anchored Alastair Stewart's Sunday Programme until 2001.

Stewart also presented Police Camera Action!, which originally started in 1994, on ITV, showing video footage of examples of road crime from police cars. In 2003 he was dropped from this role after his second conviction for drink driving. He was more than three times the legal limit when his car crashed in Hampshire. Episodes that had already been recorded for broadcast in 2002 were finally shown in January 2006.

=== 2000s ===
Stewart was a presenter on the now defunct ITV News Channel for the 2003 Iraq War presenting a weekday programme called Live with Alastair Stewart.

He was also a regular presence in ITV's national election coverage, co-anchoring network coverage of the general elections of 2005 (with Jonathan Dimbleby), 1997 (with Dimbleby and Michael Brunson), 1992 (with Jon Snow) and 1987 (with Alastair Burnet). He was the main anchor of Election Night Live: America Decides, ITV's through-the-night programme covering the 2008 US Presidential election.

In February 2007, he became co-presenter of the ITV Lunchtime News, replacing Nicholas Owen. The bulletin was revamped in July 2009, from which point Stewart became one of two main alternate newscasters for the programme. Also in 2007, he hosted a political programme for ITV, Moral of the Story, which aired at various late times on Sunday nights.

In August 2009, it was announced that he would become main co-presenter of the ITV Evening News, relinquishing his role as presenter of London Tonight. This came into effect from 7 September 2009. He was also the main presenter of ITV's general election results programme in 2010.

Stewart is a fan of the band The Rolling Stones, winning Celebrity Mastermind on 29 December 2009 with the band as his specialist subject.

=== 2010s ===
On 15 April 2010, Stewart moderated the first ever United Kingdom political leaders' debates between the prime ministerial candidates in the 2010 general election, featuring the Labour incumbent Gordon Brown, Conservative leader David Cameron and Liberal Democrat leader Nick Clegg, debating on live television. Three debates were to take place, produced by ITV, the BBC and Sky. By random lots, ITV drew the first debate, and chose Stewart to act as moderator.

Stewart received honorary doctorates from the University of Plymouth in September 2010, from the University of Winchester in 2011, and from the University of Sunderland in 2012.

On 28 December 2014, Stewart presented a one-off ITV documentary called Unbelievable Moments: Caught on Camera. The programme returned for further episodes in January 2016 and 2017.

In 2015, Stewart made his West End theatrical debut in An Evening with Lucian Freud by Laura-Jane Foley. He played a hapless interviewer appearing on video alongside Cressida Bonas, Russell Grant and Maureen Lipman.

In June 2015, it was announced that, as part of a wider restructure at ITV News, Mark Austin would return to the ITV Evening News full-time, alongside Mary Nightingale from October 2015. Alastair Stewart continued to appear on the programme as a relief newscaster, alongside his duties on the ITV Lunchtime News. Coinciding with the main presenter line-up, the programme was again being referred to as the ITV Evening News.

He presented ITV News coverage of the 2016 United Kingdom European Union membership referendum. He also appeared on Celebrity Mastermind for the second time in December 2019, answering questions on Lewis Hamilton.

=== 2020s ===
In early January 2020, Stewart engaged in a dispute on Twitter with Martin Shapland, a black man. During the dispute, Stewart made a tweet addressed to Shapland which quoted the line "Most ignorant of what he's most assur'd – His glassy elegance – like an angry ape" from the Shakespeare play Measure for Measure. ITN received public complaints about this post and others. On 29 January 2020, Stewart deleted his Twitter account and announced he would be stepping down as an ITV News presenter. The following day, an ITN source said his departure came after "multiple 'errors of judgment' in his use of social media", not just the Measure for Measure quote. Following Stewart's departure, Shapland said "I understand that Mr Stewart has acknowledged the words he used were misjudged and has expressed regret at what happened. I thank him for that... It is regrettable that he has decided to stand down and I take no pleasure in that."

Later in 2020, Stewart worked as a relief presenter for Talkradio. In early April 2021 it was announced that he would join GB News to host a weekend news and current affairs programme. On 16 July 2021, he announced he would temporarily suspend hosting on GB News following a hip injury and returned on 28 August 2021. He covered for Andrew Neil from 30 August until 3 September.

On 19 March 2023, GB News aired the final edition of Alastair Stewart & Friends. Stewart announced his retirement a few days later. He stated that he would continue to contribute to GB News as an occasional guest and pundit, and provided commentary on the Coronation of King Charles III on Saturday 6 May.

== Personal life ==
Stewart has been married to Sally Ann Jung since 1978 and has four children. His son Alex Stewart was formerly a football analyst for Tifo Football, a division of The Athletic. He and his wife live on a farm in Bramdean, Hampshire. His nephew is actor Nick Hendrix.

In 2003, Stewart was banned from driving for 23 months and fined £3,000; he had been arrested, charged and convicted of drink driving after crashing his car into a hedge and telegraph pole while three times over the legal alcohol limit in June 2003. He had the original 30-month ban reduced after he agreed to go on a rehabilitation course for disqualified drivers.

In September 2023, Stewart announced during an interview on GB News that he had been diagnosed with early-onset vascular dementia after suffering a "series of strokes" and began to feel "discombobulated" when [undertaking] simple tasks around the house. Stewart had smoked since his teens and had smoked up to 40 cigarettes a day, but said the diagnosis had led to him "stopping smoking, going on longer dog walks and trying to keep his brain active with puzzles."

=== Charity ===
Stewart is an active supporter of a number of charities, including Kids for Kids which helps villages in Darfur, and Patron of Naomi House & Jacksplace, hospices for children and young adults, near Winchester. He is also an ambassador for Action for Children and a Patron for Brooke – Action for working horses and donkeys.

Stewart has appeared twice on the celebrity editions of game show The Chase. His first appearance was on 19 October 2013. His second appearance was a Text Santa special on 20 December 2013 and featured his fellow ITV News presenters Romilly Weeks, Matt Barbet, and Charlene White.

== Awards and honours ==
- The Face of London Award at the 2002 Royal Television Society awards.
- Presenter of the Year Award at the 2004 Royal Television Society awards for his live coverage of the Beslan siege.
- News presenter of the Year at the 2005 RTS awards for his ITV News Channel programme Live with Alastair Stewart.
- Order of the British Empire (OBE) in 2006 for services to broadcasting and charity.
- Honorary Doctor of Laws in 2008 by the University of Bristol for services to broadcasting.
- Stewart received honorary doctorates from the University of Plymouth in September 2010, from the University of Winchester in 2011, and from the University of Sunderland in 2012.

== Filmography ==
Television

Year	Title	Role
1980–1982	ITV News	Reporter
1983–1986	Channel 4 News	Reporter
1986–1992, 2009–2020	ITV Evening News (previously News at 5.45)	Presenter
1986–1992, 2003–2020	ITV Weekend News	Presenter
1989–1992, 2009–2020	ITV News at Ten	Presenter
1993–2009	London Tonight	Lead presenter
1994–2009	Police Camera Action!	Presenter
1995–2001	Alastair Stewart's Sunday Programme	Presenter
2003–2005	ITV News Live with Alastair Stewart	Presenter
2005–2020	ITV Lunchtime News	Presenter
2007	Moral of the Story	Presenter
2008–2009	The Late News	Presenter
2004–2008	ITV News at 10:30	Presenter
2008, 2012	Election Night Live: America Decides	Presenter
2010	The First Election Debate	Presenter
2010	Election 2010 - The Results	Presenter
2013	Newsflash: Stories That Stopped the World	Presenter
2013	Margaret Thatcher: The Woman Who Changed Britain	Presenter
2014, 2016, 2017	Unbelievable Moments: Caught on Camera	Presenter
2021–2023	GB News with Alastair Stewart & Friends	Presenter

Guest appearances

- Countdown (1998–2002, 2008–2010)
- Celebrity Who Wants to Be a Millionaire? (2006)
- Celebrity Mastermind (2009)
- Celebrity Antiques Road Trip (2012)
- The Chase: Celebrity Special (2013)
- And Here Is the News... (2015)
- Pointless Celebrities (2016)
- Tipping Point: Lucky Stars (2017)

Media offices
Preceded by John Stapleton	Royal Television Society; 2005	Succeeded by Jeremy Thompson
Preceded by Nicholas Owen	Male host, ITV Lunchtime News; 2007–2020	Succeeded by TBC
Preceded by Mark Austin (1st time)	Male co-host, ITV Evening News; 2009–2015	Succeeded by Mark Austin (2nd time)
Preceded by N/A	Deputy Newscaster, ITV News at Ten; 2009–2020	Succeeded by Nina Hossain
