= The Late News (British TV programme) =

British TV news programme

- Genre: National and International News
- Theme music composer: Dave Hewson
- Opening theme: "Global Headlines"
- Country of origin: United Kingdom
- Original language: English

Production
- Production locations: ITN headquarters, London, England, UK
- Camera setup: Multi-camera
- Running time: 30 minutes (approx.)
- Production company: ITN

Original release
- Network: ITV
- Release: 18 January 2008 – 6 March 2009

Related
- ITV News at Ten

The Late News is a British late evening news programme that was broadcast on ITV television network on Friday at 11:00pm between 18 January 2008 and 6 March 2009. It was produced by ITN.

The thirty-minute news programme, introduced alongside a revamped News at Ten that aired from Monday to Thursday, enabled ITV to air dramas and entertainment programming past 10:00pm on Friday evenings. The Late News was initially presented by News at Ten newscasters Mark Austin and Julie Etchingham. However on 15 February 2008, The Late News was realigned with ITV News branding and presented by one newscaster, although continued to be introduced by continuity announcers and billed in television listings as The Late News until its demise. Following an increase in viewing figures for News at Ten, ITV cancelled The Late News on 6 March 2009 in order for the 10:00pm programme to air every weeknight at that time.

== Presenters ==
Lead presenters
Year	Presenter
2008	Mark Austin
2008	Julie Etchingham

Other presenters
Year	Presenter
2008–2009	Katie Derham
2008–2009	Nina Hossain
2008–2009	James Mates
2008–2009	Lucy Meacock
2008–2009	Steve Scott
2008–2009	Alastair Stewart
2008–2009	Geraint Vincent
2008–2009	Romilly Weeks
