= ITV Evening News =

British TV news programme (since 1955)

- ITV News opening sequence
- Genre: News and Current Affairs
- Presented by: Mary Nightingale
- Voices of: Gayanne Potter (intro)
- Theme music composer: Dave Hewson
- Opening theme: "Global Broadcast"
- Country of origin: United Kingdom
- Original language: English

Production
- Production locations: ITN headquarters, London, England
- Editors: Rachel Corp (Editor, ITV News)
- Camera setup: Multi-camera
- Running time: 30–60 minutes
- Production company: ITN

Original release
- Network: ITV
- Release: 22 September 1955 – present

Related
- ITN Early Evening News; ITV Lunchtime News; ITV News at Ten; ITV Weekend News

The ITV Evening News is the evening news programme produced by ITN on the British television network ITV. It airs Monday to Friday from 6:30pm usually until 7.30pm (since March 2022) though the finishing time of the bulletin can occasionally be brought forward to 7pm in cases of coverage by ITV Sport or other special programmes airing on ITV. The ITV Evening News covers British national and international news stories and is presented by Mary Nightingale.

== History ==
On 22 September 1955 when the ITV television service was launched, ITN provided an early evening news service at 5:50pm. It was known simply as ITN News, and usually presented by Gordon Honeycombe. This simple bulletin made use of a single camera, and was intended as a round-up of the day's headlines and (from 1967) looking at stories to be covered in more length by that evening's edition of News at Ten.

On 6 September 1976, ITN News moved to 5:45pm and was renamed News at 545. The 545 marked a major departure in presentational style from the ITN News that had preceded it. Initially, the bulletins were broadcast from the Police 5 studio, which enabled the producers to make extensive use of chromakey to display images behind the newscaster, several studio cameras, interviews with correspondents in the studio and on a TV monitor, and wide screen shots of the studio set at the beginning and end of the programme, and when handing over to correspondents.

Alastair Burnet was the original presenter of the News at 545. Michael Nicholson fronted the bulletin on Fridays, and was also a relief presenter. Immediately after the animated visual 'roll' and electronic theme music at the beginning, an announcer intoned in a hushed tone: "The news at 5:45, with Alastair Burnett/Michael Nicholson". Other relief presenters in the late 1970s included Leonard Parkin, who at the time also regularly hosted the News at One, and Martyn Lewis. In March 1980, when Burnet departed the 545 to present News at Ten, Nicholson replaced him as lead presenter, with Carol Barnes taking over as relief presenter. In September 1986, Nicholson left the 545 to return to war reporting, and was replaced by Alastair Stewart.

On 4 April 1988, the News at 545 underwent some cosmetic changes, with the animated visual 'roll' logo and electronic theme music being dropped in favour of a new computer-generated opening sequence and a more contemporary theme tune; the studio images were still inlaid using chromakey, although these were now also generated by computer. The programme was moved to the main newsroom within the ITN headquarters building, and full-length reports were now featured as part of the programme. ITN dispensed with the "main" presenter and relief host format, and instead a "team" of newscasters – Alastair Stewart, Fiona Armstrong, Nicholas Owen, Trevor McDonald, Sue Carpenter and Carol Barnes – began presenting the show on a "rotation" basis. On 13 February 1989, the introduction of a national weather forecast at the end of the programme led to the bulletin's timeslot starting earlier at 5:40pm, being extended in length and the title being changed to News at 540.

Due to the Gulf Crisis of 1991, ITN were temporarily granted a full half-hour slot each evening; the continued change of time (and length) of the bulletin around this time led to the News at 540 being known simply as the ITN News.

On 2 March 1992, the ITN News at 540 was renamed as the ITN Early Evening News - a name previously used now and again in the 1980s on occasions when the bulletin did not air at its usual time for any reason (usually as the result of a live sporting event overrunning). The new look made good use of ITN's impressive headquarters in London with opening sequence consisting of a camera panning across the building towards the newsdesk giving a panoramic view of the newsroom. John Suchet became the lead presenter, a role in which he continued until 1999. Barnes and Owen acted as relief presenters.

On 5 June 1995, the ITN Early Evening News was relaunched, bringing it into line with the Lunchtime News which relaunched on 13 March. By the end of July, all of ITN's news programmes on ITV had been relaunched with a more unified look, with exception to News at Ten which maintained its separate identity. The new look, however, brought elements of News at Ten to ITN's other bulletins such as the use of the clockface of Big Ben and the News at Ten theme-tune, however the tune was rearranged differently. The studio at the time made heavy use of the colour blue – ITN's corporate colour at the time. The intro showed different images of Big Ben's clockface with the hands of the clock eventually striking the time at 5:40 – the time at which the programme began. Around this time, Dermot Murnaghan became the main relief presenter in addition to his role as the lead presenter of the Lunchtime News.

On 8 March 1999, the ITN Early Evening News moved from 5:40pm to 6:30pm and renamed the ITV Evening News, coinciding with major changes to the scheduling of news programmes on ITV.

The axing of News at Ten proved unpopular at the time and caused an outcry from politicians and the general public, and ratings for ITV's news programmes fell. ITV News at Ten returned on 22 January 2001, with McDonald once again at the helm; Murnaghan and Young became the lead presenters of the dual-headed Evening News. Mary Nightingale replaced Young a few months later when Young decided not to return following maternity leave. Mark Austin replaced Murnaghan following his defection to BBC News in late 2002.

The programme relaunched on 2 February 2004 in what was then a state of the art virtual studio set dubbed the Theatre of News by the media, along with the other ITV News programmes. The move saw the ITN newscasters standing (or walking) in front of a news-wall and presenting graphics to viewers. The Theatre of News was scaled back following a relaunch on 9 February 2009, with a return to a more traditional style of presenters sat behind a desk.

On 3 August 2009, it was announced that after 16 years co-presenting London Tonight, Alastair Stewart was to leave the regional news programme to become lead co-presenter of the ITV Evening News. Mark Austin would focus on ITV News at Ten, but continue as a relief presenter for the 6.30pm bulletin.

On 2 November 2009, the programme was retitled as the ITV News at 6:30. The studio set was virtual, using a new green screen electronic compositing system known as 'Ultimatte'. Virtual sets can be created instantly and at low cost. Unlike traditional Chroma key systems, Ultimatte allows for such things as full camera movement and can generate artificial reflections on glass and metallic surfaces.

It was announced in June 2015 that, as part of a wider restructure at ITV News, Mark Austin would return to the programme full-time, alongside Mary Nightingale from October 2015. Alastair Stewart continued to appear on the programme as a relief presenter, alongside his duties on the ITV Lunchtime News. Coinciding with the main presenter line-up, the programme is once again being referred to as the ITV Evening News.

After thirty years with ITV News, it was announced on 26 October 2016 that Austin would leave at the end of the year. It was later confirmed on 13 December 2016 that Nightingale would become the sole presenter of the ITV Evening News from January 2017 onwards. Austin presented his final bulletin alongside Nightingale on 22 December 2016.

On 24 January 2022, ITV announced that the ITV Evening News would be extended to an hour from 7 March 2022, following the biggest expansion of the ITV News Network in 20 years. The move involved hiring 27 new staff including journalists, producers and camera operators. The move aimed to ensure more live coverage would be provided from more locations across the UK, with an emphasis to cover more stories around Britain. The regional news programmes were scheduled to remain at 30 minutes in the usual 6:00pm slot.

ITV Border Scotland, ITV Cymru Wales, STV and UTV have the option of opting-out of the Friday edition of the programme at 7pm to broadcast regional shows.

On 7 March 2022, the first newly extended ITV Evening News was broadcast at 6:30pm on ITV with Mary Nightingale, who continues to be main anchor of the show, with slightly tweaked on screen graphics, and with the addition of the national ITV Weather bulletin, usually presented by Alex Beresford now being broadcast during the hour show in the studio. The set was altered very slightly, with the screens either side of the presenter changing. The rest of the set (later it underwent a small refresh on 30 September 2024) and the theme tune stayed the same. The bulletin's length is occasionally shortened back to 30 minutes in the event of ITV Sport coverage airing on ITV, to allow displaced editions of Emmerdale to begin at 7pm, and some one-off programmes.

On 5 January 2026, as part of cost-cutting measures, the ITV Evening News would replace the virtual studio set to a more standard studio set (for the first time since 2004) that shared with Good Morning Britain and the other ITV News bulletins, as well as ITV News London.

== Viewing figures ==
ITV Evening News was watched by an average of 3.2 million viewers (a 21% share of viewing) in 2021.

== Theme music ==
The opening title music has been composed by Dave Hewson since 1992. The current title sequence was designed by Lambie Nairn and the music is called "Global Broadcast".

== On air staff ==
=== Main newscaster ===
- Mary Nightingale (2001–)

=== Other newscasters ===
- Gamal Fahnbulleh (2023–)
- Charlotte Hawkins (2025–)
- Lucrezia Millarini (2019–)
- Geraint Vincent (2006–12, 2019, 2023–)
- Romilly Weeks (2006–14, 2021–)
- Charlene White (2014–)

=== Former newscasters ===
- Fiona Armstrong (1985–1991)
- Mark Austin (2001–2016)
- Carol Barnes (1982–1994)
- Felicity Barr (2001–2005)
- Michael Brunson (1980–1981)
- Alastair Burnet (1976–1984)
- Andrea Byrne (2011–2012)
- Sue Carpenter (1988–1990)
- Andrea Catherwood (2003–2006)
- Katie Derham (1999–2010)
- Julie Etchingham (2008–2015)
- Shiulie Ghosh (1998–2006)
- Nina Hossain (2004–2019)
- Natasha Kaplinsky (2011–2016)
- Martyn Lewis (1980–1988)
- James Mates (2002–2018)
- Trevor McDonald (1982–1990, 1999–2001)
- Lucy Meacock (2007–2009)
- Dermot Murnaghan (1989–2002)
- Bill Neely (2004–2008)
- Michael Nicholson (1976–1986)
- Lucy Owen (2004–2006)
- Nicholas Owen (1990–2007)
- Leonard Parkin (1976–1987)
- Kylie Pentelow (2021, 2023)
- Steve Scott (2005–2015)
- Ranvir Singh (2014–2020)
- Julia Somerville (1998–2000)
- Alastair Stewart (1986–1992, 2009–2020)
- John Suchet (1991–2004)
- Chris Ship (2021–22)
- Rageh Omaar (2015–21)
- Kirsty Young (2000–2001)

Preceded by Tonight with Trevor McDonald	RTS: Television Journalism; News Programme of the Year; 2003	Succeeded by BBC News at Ten
Preceded by BBC News at Ten	RTS: Television Journalism; News Programme of the Year; 2005–2007	Succeeded by BBC News at Ten
Preceded by Channel 4 News: Leak of Attorney General Advice on Legality of Iraq War	RTS: Television Journalism; News – Home (Selly Oak – A Soldier's Story); 2007	Succeeded by Channel 4 News: The Crevice Trial: Links To 7/7
