= The Late News =

The Late News may refer to:

- The Late News (British TV programme), a defunct British news bulletin programme broadcast on ITV that aired from 2008 to 2009
- The Late News (Hong Kong TV programme), the defunct evening news bulletin programme broadcast on ATV News in Hong Kong

== See also ==
- Late-night news
