= Melissa Andrzejewski =

Extreme sports athlete

Melissa Burns
- Born: Melissa Dawn Burns; June 22, 1984 (age 42)
- Education: Embry–Riddle Aeronautical University
- Occupation: Extreme sports athlete
- Website: www.sportsgal.com

Melissa Dawn Burns (born 1984), also known as Melissa Andrzejewski, is an American extreme sports athlete best known for being an aerobatics pilot, skydiver, B.A.S.E jumper, climber and technical scuba diver. She has won awards at home and internationally for her aerobatics and competitive flying. Melissa works internationally as an airshow display pilot and skydiver.

== Early life and education ==
Andrzejewski started flying when she was 18. She became one of the youngest female pilots to compete in Unlimited World Aerobatics and the youngest female to ever make the US Unlimited Aerobatic Team at 22 years old. Andrzejewski is a graduate of Embry-Riddle Aeronautical University.

== Career ==
Andrzejewski won the Wingsuit B.A.S.E. race to become women's world champion in Voss, Norway at Extreme Sports Week in 2015 and took part in the 164 way vertical world record that same year. Melissa has participated in the Wingsuit World League in China several times for the women's race.

She was inducted into the Embry-Riddle Chancellor's Hall of Fame in 2015.

In June 2016, Andrzejewski participated in a first-of-its-kind aviation stunt where she flew her stunt airplane underneath a motocross freestyle rider, ‘Fitz’ doing a backflip and a slackline artist, ‘Sketchy’ Andy Lewis, on his slackline at the same time.

Also in 2016, Andrzejewski was removed from the US Aerobatic Team by the IAC after accusing a competitor of sexually harassing her while competing at the World Aerobatic Championships. There was controversy surrounding these actions, which Andrzejewski attributed to sexism and corruption in a field dominated by men. Melissa is the only US Team Member from that team to hold an individual overall world medal.

== Filmography ==
- Sky dancers
- Bush Air
- Keen 'n Able
- 60 Minutes Australia
- Caught on Camera
- CBS Sunday Morning Show.
- Les avions du bout du monde - S5 - Alaska, la voltigeuse des glaces

== Personal life ==
Andrzejewski and Rex Pemberton divorced in May 2016. In 2017, Andrzejewski married Trent Burns and changed her name to Melissa Dawn Burns. Their daughter Isla Sky Burns was born on November 5, 2017, and their son Koa Dean Burns was born November 5, 2019.
