= George Ffitch =

English newsreader, television presenter, radio personality and journalist

- Born: George Norman Ffitch; 23 January 1929; West Ham, Essex, England
- Died: 5 July 2001 (aged 72); Chelsea, London, England
- Occupations: Broadcaster; Journalist
- Spouse: Pamela Lyle (m. 1958; died 1990)
- Children: 2

George Norman Ffitch (23 January 1929 – 5 July 2001) was an English newsreader, television presenter, radio personality and journalist. He began working for ITN as an industrial and political correspondent and later a programme editor when it was founded in 1955, covering elections and results broadcasts, political conventions in the United States and party conferences in the United Kingdom. Ffitch presented television programs such as This Week and News at Ten. He also worked as the political and assistant editor at The Economist and also at the Daily Express. He was managing director of LBC and Independent Radio News from 1979 to his retirement in 1985.

== Biography ==
=== Early life ===
Ffitch was born at 29 Charlotte Street in West Ham in Essex (now part of the London Borough of Newham) on 23 January 1929. He was the son of the railway porter Robert George Ffitch and his wife Margaret Matilda (née Norman). Ffitch and was educated in state schools such as Barking Abbey School. He was a graduate of the London School of Economics. Ffitch was selected to take part in an academic diploma in Slavonic and east European studies as an internal student at the UCL School of Slavonic and East European Studies and graduated in 1952 while serving in the Royal Army Service Corps as part of his National Service in Finland. He was chosen to do the Army's Russian course at Bodmin during the early 1950s; Ffitch retained his knowledge of Russian.

=== Career ===
He wrote for the Tokio Evening News newspaper, helped the political scientist Robert McKenzie to prepare the 1955 work British Political Parties and worked for the local Dagenham Times newspaper. Ffitch began working for ITN as an industrial and political correspondent and later a programme editor following the launch of the commercial television network ITV in 1955. He covered the South Lewisham and Carmarthen by-elections in 1957, the 1958 Rochdale by-election, and the weekly feature programme Roving Report in 1959 on ITV. In 1962, Ffitch became a freelancer, and worked for ITV on a permanent basis on the broadcaster's current affairs programme, This Week, and the BBC on the show Gallery. He also covered elections and results broadcasts, political conventions in the United States, party conferences in the United Kingdom and Trades Union Congress debates live for ITN.

From July 1967, Fiftch was one of four newscasters for the daily half-hour News at Ten bulletin alongside Alastair Burnet, Andrew Gardner and Reginald Bosanquet. He supported the program's length, novel to Britain, having noticed the success 30 minutes had in the United States. In the same year, Ffitch left ITN to work in print journalism. He worked at The Economist as their political editor and assistant editor with articles published on a weekly basis, replacing Ian Trethowan who later became the BBC's Director-General. Ffitch joined the Daily Express as an associate editor in 1974 and remained there until 1976.

He was chair of the panel of the ITV programme Face the Press that was broadcast from 1976 to 1978. Ffitch was later employed by Geoffrey Cox to be the managing director of LBC and Independent Radio News. He held the position from January 1979 until he left in March 1985 due to ill health and was temporarily replaced by LBC's general manager Bill Coppen-Gardner. Ffitch retired that same year; David Nicolas wrote in The Guardian that Ffitch was known as an effective leader who was devoted to his colleagues.

== Personal life ==
He married Pamela Lyle on 6 February 1958, after the two met at ITN and they had two children; a daughter and a son. Lyle predeceased him in 1990. Ffitch's home was burgled while he was away in August 1967. He died at the Royal Brompton and Harefield NHS Trust in Chelsea, London on 5 July 2001.
