= Nina Hossain =

English journalist and presenter

- Born: Huddersfield, West Yorkshire, England
- Education: University of Durham; University of Central Lancashire
- Occupations: Journalist, presenter
- Years active: 1996–present
- Employer: ITN
- Television: Newsroom South East; BBC London News; ITV News; ITV News London; Lookaround
- Spouse: Craig O'Hara (m. 2000; div. 2004)
- Partner: Stuart Thomas (2005–present)
- Children: 3

Nina Hossain is a British journalist and presenter employed by ITN as the lead presenter of the ITV Lunchtime News.

== Early life ==
Hossain was born in Huddersfield, West Yorkshire, England to a Bangladeshi father and an English mother. Her father, Tabarek Hossain (1935–2002), was born in India (now Bangladesh) and migrated to Britain in the 1960s (when Bangladesh was still East Pakistan). He was a psychiatrist with a specialism in alcoholism, who set up the Kirklees Alcohol Advisory Service in 1973 at the town centre, and was the founder and president of Concern For Mental Health in West Yorkshire. Her father married an English nurse, Pamela from Nottingham. Of her Bangladeshi parentage, she states that she has never visited Bangladesh, and does not speak Bengali. She also states that while her father never discussed religion, Hossain and her younger sister, Rezina, "were nominally Muslim".

== Television career ==
Hossain's ambitions to be a journalist began at an early age. She has a degree from the University of Durham, (St Cuthbert's Society). She then gained a postgraduate diploma in broadcast journalism at the department of Journalism, Media and Communication, University of Central Lancashire, Preston.

In 1996 she was chosen for a traineeship at ITV Border on Lookaround where she was a news presenter, producer and reporter. In 2000 she was a presenter for The Medical Channel. In 2001 she became a presenter and reporter for Newsroom South East and BBC London News on BBC London. In March 2004 she became the main presenter on the programme whilst Emily Maitlis took maternity leave.

She was the word pronouncer for Series 1 of Hard Spell, a BBC One spelling competition for children. She reprised this role in the one-off episode of spin-off Star Spell (similar to Hard Spell, but with celebrities instead of children), but when Star Spell became a full series, she had joined ITV and so was replaced by BBC newsreader Mishal Husain, who continued this role through the second series of Hard Spell.

In November 2004, Hossain joined ITN as the main co-presenter for the ITV Evening News on ITV, whilst Mary Nightingale took maternity leave. Following Nightingale's return she was a relief presenter for ITV London (ITV News London) and ITV News (ITV Lunchtime News, ITV Evening News, ITV News at Ten and ITV Weekend News).

During April 2010, she was also a guest presenter for GMTV, standing in for Lorraine Kelly on GMTV with Lorraine. In June 2010, she replaced Katie Derham as a presenter of London Tonight, initially alongside Donal MacIntyre. However, on 1 November 2010 she became the sole presenter. She also presented the ITV Lunchtime News in a shared role with Alastair Stewart.

Hossain has been part of ITV's Election Live coverage for the 2015, 2017 and 2019 elections.

On 24 May 2019 it was announced Hossain would leave ITV News London and become the lead presenter of the ITV Lunchtime News. She presented her final ITV News London 6pm bulletin on 19 June 2019.

She continues to occasionally relief present ITV News at Ten.

Hossain has reported for ITV series Exposure and On Assignment.

From March until June 2020 she presented the weekly Coronavirus: Q&A on ITV.

In March 2024 Hossain gained considerable attention on social media after referring to Jeremy Hunt live on ITV News as "Mr Cunt". She apologised shortly after claiming it was "A slip of the tongue".

== Other work ==
In November 2022, Hossain appeared in an episode of Celebrity Antiques Road Trip alongside fellow news presenter Lucrezia Millarini.

In 2004, Hossain appeared as a reporter in the film Trauma, which starred Colin Firth.

She has also appeared in roles in television including playing a newsreader in the 2011 TV shows "Hidden" and "Case Sensitive" and in 2022 she played a newsreader in "McDonald & Dodds".

Hossain reads a fake news story at the end of the Duran Duran song "The Man Who Stole a Leopard" and performs the voice of the satellite navigation on "Blame the Machines", both from the band's 2010 album All You Need Is Now.

She is also the charity ambassador for Whizz Kidz, doing the 2017 Virgin London Marathon to raise funds for them.

== Awards and nominations ==
In January 2015, she was nominated for the Services to Media award at the British Muslim Awards.

== Personal life ==
Hossain now lives between London and the Midlands. She is divorced from her former husband of four years, Sky News studio director Craig O'Hara. Hossain has been in a relationship with her current partner, former editor of ITV's London Tonight regional news programme, Stuart Thomas, since the spring of 2005 and together they have three children.

In 2005, Hossain drew attention from the media when she was mugged on London's South Bank, and for going to work the same day, saying that she did not consider it "a big deal".

In January 2007, it was revealed that sex offender David Decoteau from London, 45, had an unhealthy interest in Hossain and that he had also sent letters to BBC newsreader Emily Maitlis.

== See also ==
- British Bangladeshis
- List of British Bangladeshis

Media offices
Preceded by Katie Derham	Main Newscaster: ITV Lunchtime News; 2010–present	Incumbent
Preceded by Katie Derham	Main Newscaster: ITV News London; 2010–2019	Succeeded by Charlene White
