= Nightwatch with Steve Scott =

- Also known as: Nightwatch: Action Stations; Nightwatch: Crime; Nightwatch: Emergency; Nightwatch: Mystery
- Genre: Documentary
- Presented by: Steve Scott
- Country of origin: United Kingdom

Production
- Producers: ITV Central (ITV Productions)
- Camera setup: Single-camera (documentaries), Multi-camera (studio links)
- Running time: 50 minutes per episode

Original release
- Network: ITV
- Release: 8 January 2008 – 2010

Nightwatch with Steve Scott is a weekday late-night documentary series in the UK on ITV, first broadcast on 8 January 2008. The series was presented by the ITV News journalist Steve Scott and was produced by ITV Central. Nightwatch features various regional ITV programmes focusing on crime and emergency services. The series was aired on ITV on various nights, anytime between midnight and 03:00. The show was also repeated on the ITV-owned digital channel Men & Motors.

The series is presented from a regional news studio usually used for Central News East at ITV Central's studios in Gas Street, Birmingham.

== Programme strands ==
- Nightwatch: Action Stations focuses on the work of fighter pilots and ground troops on duty in Afghanistan, plus insights into Air Sea Rescue and the Red Arrows aerobatic team.
- Nightwatch: Crime follows rapid-response road policing units or localised vice squads, often from the Greater Manchester Police.
- Nightwatch: Emergency focuses on paramedics or air ambulance units (typically from Selly Oak Hospital in Birmingham), and occasionally coastal rescue in the Swansea area.
- Nightwatch: Mystery tells stories of unsolved or lengthy cases of serial killing, murder, rape and other grievous crimes – some dating back over a century.

== Featured programmes ==
Regional programmes featured in the series included:

- Crimefighters – various versions produced by ITV Granada, ITV Yorkshire, ITV Border and ITV Central
- Helicops – produced by ITV Wales
- True Crimes – produced by ITV Border
- Emergency: Medics – produced by ITV West and ITV Westcountry
