= Lucrezia Millarini =

English TV news journalist (born 1976)

- Born: Lucrezia Gaia Millarini; London, England
- Education: Bristol University
- Occupations: Journalist, television presenter
- Years active: 2010–present
- Employer: ITN
- Television: ITV London, ITV News
- Spouse: Simon Kurs (m. 2011)

Lucrezia Gaia Millarini is an English news journalist. She is employed by ITN and presents ITV News.

== Early life ==
Lucrezia Gaia Millarini was born in February 1976, and grew up in London with a father of Italian descent and an English mother.

She attended an independent nursery - Dallington School in Clerkenwell, central London - then state-run primary and secondary education at St John the Evangelist Catholic Primary School in Islington, north London and La Sainte Union Catholic School, an all-girls' convent secondary in Highgate, north London. She studied for her A-levels at Woodhouse College in North Finchley, north London.

Before starting her career in journalism, Millarini studied law at Bristol University and went on to train as a barrister, and subsequently completed a postgraduate diploma in Broadcast Journalism from City University. Initially working for a local radio station in Oxford, Millarini joined ITN's digital operation in London, reporting for the digital 24-hour rolling news channel.

== Career ==
In December 2010, she joined ITV News London as their Entertainment Correspondent. In January 2013, she was appointed a newsreader. At present, Millarini now regularly presents the ITV News London main 6pm programme, as well as the ITV Lunchtime News (since 2017), ITV Weekend News (since 2015), the ITV Evening News (since 2019), and the ITV News at Ten (since 2021). As well as fronting television news, Millarini has also reported for ITV's flagship current affairs programme, On Assignment.

Millarini reported on the births of two of the royal babies, and was reporting on the coverage of the wedding of Prince Harry and Meghan Markle.

She participated on Dancing on Ice on ITV in January 2020. She won an episode of Celebrity Mastermind broadcast in December 2020.

On 9 April 2021, she broke the news of the death of Prince Philip, Duke of Edinburgh in a special announcement on ITV. In December 2021, Millarini was one of the contestants on the BBC One quiz show The Weakest Link, with the new host Romesh Ranganathan.

In May 2022, Millarini took part in the ITV hosted celebrity athletics show The Games, and in November 2022, appeared alongside her fellow ITN newsreader Nina Hossain in the BBC Two show Celebrity Antiques Road Trip.

In January 2025, Millarini took part in the Channel 4, series six of Celebrity Hunted, alongside Simon McCoy.

In February 2025, Millarni appeared as third and final contestant on an edition of ITVs Celebrity Who Wants to Be a Millionaire? hosted by Jeremy Clarkson She won £16,000 for the homeless charity, St Mungo's before running out of time, with 3 unused lifelines intact.

== Personal life ==
Millarini lives in southeast London with her husband, the journalist Simon Kurs. Millarini also has a Lhasa Apso named Milo.

She is a patron of the animal welfare charities Dogs On The Streets (DOTS) and Support Dogs. She also supports Cats Protection, The Humane Society and People for the Ethical Treatment of Animals.
