= Felicity Barr =

English journalist and presenter

- Born: 6 September 1970 (age 55)
- Occupations: Journalist, news presenter
- Notable credit: Al Jazeera English
- Spouse: Paul Harrison (m. 2009)

Felicity Barr (born 6 September 1970) is an English broadcast journalist, and former Al Jazeera English news presenter.

== Radio career ==
Barr trained as a journalist at 2-Ten FM, before she specialised in sports reporting, covering events in sport since 1994 when she worked as a freelance journalist.

== Television career ==
Five years after starting in radio, she transferred to television and in 1996 joined ITV Meridian as a sports reporter/presenter for the nightly news programme Meridian Tonight, based at studios in Newbury, Berks, as well as presenting for sports programme A406.

Barr moved to the London News Network in 1999, covering sporting events and she also presented LWT's Goals Extra programme. Barr joined ITV News in 2001 as its first ever female sports correspondent. Her first major assignment was covering the Wimbledon tennis tournament. During her time at ITV News, her role was extended to a relief newsreader on the ITV Weekend News, ITV Lunchtime News and ITV Evening News. In August 2004, Barr covered the Olympic Games live from Athens.

Until January 2006, she combined her role as sports presenter on the ITV News at 10.30, with her duties as a newsreader on the now defunct ITV News Channel, anchoring weekdays with Steve Scott. Barr regularly anchored live from key locations such as Westminster during major stories for both the ITV News Channel and mainstream ITV bulletins. She was also a regular guest on Richard & Judy on Channel 4.

Al Jazeera English launched on 15 November 2006 and Barr was a London news-anchor for its flagship Newshour programme. She presented the mid-week late afternoon and evening news and conducted links with correspondents in Europe. In November 2008, she anchored the US Election on location in Ohio. She has presented Talk to Al Jazeera, where she was one of the first TV journalists to interview the freed FARC hostage Ingrid Betancourt. She has also hosted The Listening Post, Al Jazeera's media-analysis programme.

== Charity interests ==
Barr is a celebrity supporter of the charity Action for Children, formerly the National Children's Home.

== Personal life ==
Barr married Sky News correspondent Paul Harrison on 19 September 2009.
