= Sameena Ali-Khan =

British media personality (born 1967)

- Born: Sameena Ali-Khan; 30 December 1967 (age 58); Belfast, Northern Ireland
- Occupations: Broadcaster, television presenter, journalist, newsreader, author
- Years active: 1989–present
- Website: Official website

Sameena Ali-Khan (born 30 December 1967) is a British media personality who is known as a television presenter, journalist and newsreader. She is also a published author.

Since commencing her media career in 1997 for the BBC, Ali-Khan has worked in various areas of broadcasting. Upon moving from the BBC to the ITV network in 2005, she has become a popular recognised face at ITV Central, as one of the main presenters for the ITV News Central programmes.

Ali-Khan has won numerous awards during her broadcasting career, including three RTS Midlands Best Screen Personality Awards in 2010, 2014 and 2015, for her work on ITV News Central.

== Life and career ==
=== Early life and education ===
Ali-Khan was born in Belfast, Northern Ireland, but initially raised in Delhi, India to Indian parents, where her father was a professor at one of the country's universities. The family moved regularly around the world, Ali-Khan living in many places such as Hong Kong. She travelled extensively due to the occupations of her father, and this gave her a desire to learn and an interest in journalism.

On her return to England, Ali-Khan studied for a degree in physiology and chemistry at the University of Salford, Manchester. Whilst studying, Ali-Khan launched her initial broadcasting career with a commercial radio station Sunset 102 in 1989. Ali-Khan completed her degree and followed up with a Masters in Art, specialising in TV features and documentary production, again from the University of Salford, Manchester.

=== Broadcasting career ===
==== 1997–2000: BBC Radio Lancashire ====
After the completion of her master's degree, Ali-Khan began her broadcasting career with the BBC working on both Asian and mainstream programmes at BBC Radio Lancashire.

==== 2000–2005: Drive on the BBC Asian Network and BBC Radio 5 Live ====
Ali-Khan relocated to Birmingham in 2000 and began hosting Drive on the BBC Asian Network and BBC Radio 5 Live stations.

Ali-Khan confesses that it was more by default than design that she ended up on a news programme like the Asian Network's Drive, I'm a failed medic! she said. I did a science degree, but didn't really like it, just mixing chemicals in a lab. As a break, I ended up going to a radio station on Wednesdays, which was my half-day off, and I just got a feel for radio then. I was answering phones but within about six months they allowed me to go on air and it all started from there.

While working on both the Asian and mainstream programmes at BBC Radio Lancashire, she heard that the Asian Network would be taking over the Asian programming there. She applied for a job at the Asian Network in Birmingham as a Senior Broadcast Journalist, despite lack of experience, and was hired. Khan said "It was a turning point in my life".

For the first few months she worked in a management role, then she job-shared that, as well as doing Drive, finally she went into presentation full-time, which had been her long held wish.

==== 2005–present day: ITV Central and ITV Weekend News ====
After working at the BBC for 5 years, Ali-Khan made the move from radio to television and joined ITV Central in 2005.

Ali-Khan initially was a presenter of the East edition of Central Tonight alongside Steve Clamp, before leaving to go on maternity leave in mid-2008.

During this period Ali-Khan also presented the ITV Weekend News on occasion during 2006.

Ali-Khan returned from maternity leave on 2 February 2009, now co-presenting the West Midlands edition of the programme, before it was merged with the East Midlands edition a fortnight later, and was renamed ITV Central.

After the merger, Ali-Khan became one of the main co-presenters of the pan-regional evening edition of the ITV News Central programme, usually sharing the broadcasting duties with her fellow presenter Bob Warman.

Ali-Khan returned to occasionally present the ITV Weekend News from 2020.

=== Other Television work ===
==== 2011: Royal Wedding Day ====
In 2011, Ali-Khan was the presenter reporting from the Mall, for Sky News' and the BBC's coverage of the historic wedding of the second heir to the throne, Prince William, and Catherine Middleton.

==== 2016: Healthy Kitchen Cooking ====
In 2016 Al-Khan presented the Healthy Kitchen Cooking show. A short series of programmes, featuring recipes for easy to make healthy dishes, with Chef Rachel Muse. The show was broadcast on channel #Sky 845.

=== Author ===
In 2014 Ali-Khan published her first novel, as the co-author of a romance based book, written with her husband, and published by Mills & Boon. They use the pseudonym Riya Lakhani as the author's name.

==== 2014: A Date with a Bollywood Star ====
- A Date with a Bollywood Star written by Riya Lakhani (2014)

== Awards/Conferences/Events Host ==
Outside of her television work, Ali-Khan utilises her presentation skills as a host for award ceremonies and on the conference circuit, at a variety of events.

Ali-Khan has hosted dozens of ceremonies since the late nineties, ranging from award presentations to chairing panel discussions.

She has conducted events for numerous organisations including Facebook, Dechert LLP, Department for Communities and Local Government and Birmingham Education Partnership.

The wide-ranging topics she has covered have included Wealth Management, Education, Business, Terrorism, Diversity, Mental Health, Brexit and the Arts.

== Personal life ==
Ali-Khan is married with two children and lives in Fox Hollies, Birmingham.

Ali-Khan describes herself on her Twitter profile as having a Big smile & big heart!. She counts her interests outside of work as her family, cooking, fashion design, keeping fit, particularly cycling and swimming. Also due to her education and studies she still retains an interest in anything scientific.

In January 2013, Ali-Khan was featured on the cover of Pukaar Magazine, which featured an interview with her, giving an insight into her work and lifestyle, and with photos from her first studio based fashion photo-shoot.

=== Official Website ===
In 2018, Ali-khan created her own personal website at www.sameena.co.uk Ali-Khan posts regular updates about any upcoming activities, details about her lifestyle and features a photo library, including video showreels.

== Charity work ==
Ali-Khan is an ambassador for Breast Cancer Research and The Prince's Trust.

She is also a patron for Breaking the Silence, a domestic abuse charity.

She regularly speaks at schools and colleges.

== Awards and nominations ==
Year	Award	Result	Refs
1998	CRE Best Radio News Programme	Won	
2004	Asian Arts and Cultural Society Media Professional of the Year	Won	
2005	KAPPA Awards Contribution to Media	Won	
2007	RTS Midlands Best Female Television Personality	Nominated	
2010	RTS Midlands Best On Screen Personality	Won	
2014	RTS Midlands Best On Screen Personality	Won	
2015	RTS Midlands Best On Screen Personality	Won	
2015	Services to Media award at the British Muslim Awards	Nominated	
2016	Excellence in Media (Birmingham Awards)	Won	
2016	RTS Midlands Best On Screen Personality	Nominated	
2017	RTS Midlands Best On Screen Personality	Nominated	
2018	RTS Midlands Best On Screen Personality	Nominated	
