= Reginald Bosanquet =

British journalist and broadcaster

- Born: Reginald Tindal Kennedy Bosanquet; 9 August 1932; Chertsey, Surrey, England
- Died: 27 May 1984 (aged 51); Chelsea, London, England
- Resting place: Putney Vale Cemetery
- Education: Ashbury College; Wellesley House School; Gresham's School; Winchester College
- Alma mater: New College, Oxford
- Occupations: Journalist, presenter
- Known for: Presenter of ITN News at Ten
- Children: 2
- Parent: Bernard Bosanquet (father)
- Relatives: Kennedy Jones (grandfather)

Reginald Tindal Kennedy Bosanquet (9 August 1932 – 27 May 1984) was a British journalist and broadcaster who was an anchor of the half-hour News at Ten bulletin for Independent Television News (ITN) from July 1967 to November 1979. He began working for ITN as a sub-editor in 1955 and was made a reporter two years later. Bosanquet served as ITN's diplomatic correspondent before joining the News at Ten team.

== Early life and education ==
Bosanquet was born in Chertsey, Surrey, on 9 August 1932, the only child of Bernard Bosanquet, the cricketer who invented the googly. His mother, Margaret, was the daughter of the journalist Kennedy Jones. Bosanquet was of Huguenot descent through two refugees who became financially successful silk merchants. He became an orphan at the age of seven, and was evacuated to Canada during the Second World War.

In Canada, Bosanquet was educated at Ashbury College in Ottawa and then at Lower Canada College in Montreal. Upon returning to England, he was taught at Wellesley House School, before continuing his education at Gresham's School while it was at Newquay and at Winchester College. Bosanquet won a scholarship to attend New College at the University of Oxford, where he studied history. He graduated with a second-class degree and did his two years of national service with the first battalion of the King's Royal Rifle Corps in Germany.

== Television ==
In 1955, after leaving Oxford, Bosanquet was encouraged to go into television by Lord Clark and Huw Wheldon. He asked Independent Television News (ITN) for a job, telling them he wanted fame to which they replied that he could begin working for them as a tea-boy. He was recruited by Aidan Crawley, and soon became a sub-editor and was made a reporter in 1957. Bosanquet worked on programmes such as Roving Report between 1957 and 1962, Dateline London from 1961 to 1962 and Dateline as a newsreader from 1962 to 1967. In 1960, he was appointed ITN's diplomatic correspondent. Bosanquet visited 52 countries in the course of his reporting career.

Bosanquet was made one of the lead anchors of the half-hour ITV News at Ten nightly bulletin when it launched on 3 July 1967. He often worked alongside Andrew Gardner, Leonard Parkin, Sandy Gall and, mostly late in his tenure, Alastair Burnet. Bosanquet served as ITN's chief newsreader from 1974 to 1976, but was suspended for a month by ITN editor Nigel Ryan in May 1976 following revelations about his marital troubles that were published in a Sunday newspaper. He made his final on-screen appearance for ITN on 8 November 1979. Bosanquet then resigned from ITN, amid claims and denials and rows in the studio but he explained that he no longer wanted to do the job.

His partnership with Anna Ford on News at Ten was popular with viewers in the late 1970s. As Ford has since revealed, this rapport could prove distressing: on one occasion Bosanquet, having somehow discovered the birth-date of Ford's mother, wished her a "happy birthday" at the end of the broadcast, unaware that she had died some time previously. Ford recalled in 2007: "Reggie was a dear. I mean, you wouldn't have chosen a man who had epilepsy, was an alcoholic, had had a stroke and wore a toupée to read the news, but the combination was absolute magic."

Although held in considerable affection by the public (he was commonly addressed by family, friends and the media as "Reggie"), Bosanquet was not without his critics as a newsreader. At times he could appear puzzled by unfamiliar foreign names while his trademark slurred delivery fed contemporary suspicions that he was a heavy drinker. Such rumours became raw material for wags and comedy writers: Bosanquet acquired such nicknames as "Reginald Beaujolais", "Reginald Boozalot" and "Reginald Boozatten".

== Later career ==
In early 1980, he presented The Bosanquet View series of three special film reports entitled Divorce, The World of Gossip Columns and Tennis that were broadcast on the BBC1 programme Nationwide. Bosanquet also made a second set of three film reports for Nationwide on fashion, the aristocracy, and wine that were shown later in the year. In 1981, he appeared in a series of three television advertisements for orange juice that were filmed in Málaga.

Bosanquet was elected the 110th rector of the University of Glasgow on 3 November 1980. Illness prevented him from being more active in the role as he would have liked, attending 10 out of the 35 University Court meetings held during his rectorship. Bosanquet's three-year term ended on 5 March 1984.

In 1980, Bosanquet "sang" (or, more accurately, narrated in the style of a newscast) the lyrics on the disco single "Dance with Me". It was voted no. 1 in the Bottom 30 by listeners of British DJ Kenny Everett. His autobiography Let's Get Through Wednesday ghostwritten by Wallace Reyburn was published in September 1980. Bosanquet was the author of the 1982 children's book Filboyd's Frogs. In 1982, he took part in the production of a one-hour videotape called Private Spy containing explicit sex scenes. Bosanquet was the patron of the Campaign for Equality in Divorce, and was a member of the World Wildlife Fund's Administrative Panel.

== Personal life ==
He was married three times. His first marriage was to the Norwegian Karin Lund on 2 April 1955 at St Michael's Church, Chester Square. A second marriage followed with Felicity Fearnley-Whittingstall between August 1964 and 11 February 1975. Although Bosanquet told an interviewer that he would not remarry, his final marriage was to Joan Adams, whom he married at Chelsea Register Office on 23 August 1983. Bosanquet had one child each from his first two marriages.

In late 1978, a woman claimed that Bosanquet was the biological father of her third child. Blood tests conducted in 1979 confirmed that he was not the child's father. The case was dropped in March 1979. Two years later, he was given a three-month conditional discharge and ordered to pay £50 in costs on charges of being drunk and disorderly in James Street, Covent Garden.

Bosanquet died from pancreatic cancer at his home in Chelsea on the evening of 27 May 1984 following a period of ill health. His funeral took place privately at Putney, South London on 2 June, and he was cremated at Putney Vale Cemetery. Bosanquet was given a memorial service attended by colleagues and family members at All Souls Church, Langham Place in Westminster on the afternoon of 4 July.

== In popular culture ==
In 1970, Bosanquet made an uncredited cameo appearance in the second series of Monty Python's Flying Circus. Bosanquet is portrayed by Matthew Cottle in the 2022 miniseries Pistol. A parody song was sung by actress Pamela Stephenson in series 1 episode 4 of the BBC comedy programme Not the Nine O'Clock News referencing him leaving his newsreading role. A running gag in that and earlier episodes of the show referenced his bouffant wig.

== See also ==
- Baron Scales
- Tyndall family

Academic offices
Preceded by John L. Bell	Rector of the University of Glasgow; 1980–1984	Succeeded by Michael Kelly
