= Michael Brunson =

British political journalist

- Born: Michael John Brunson; 12 August 1940 (age 85); Norwich, England
- Education: Bedford School, Bedfordshire (independent boarding school); The Queen's College at the University of Oxford
- Occupations: Journalist, correspondent, political presenter
- Employer(s): ITN, BBC
- Known for: Fmr. ITN Political Editor; Fmr. ITN Diplomatic Editor; Fmr. ITN Washington Correspondent; Journalist and author

Michael John Brunson OBE (born 12 August 1940, in Norwich) is a British broadcasting political journalist of over thirty years' standing. He is a former Political Editor, Diplomatic Editor and Washington Correspondent of Independent Television News, and an occasional ITN newscaster.

== Early life ==
Brunson was born on 12 August 1940 in the city of Norwich in Norfolk.

== Education ==
Brunson was educated at Bedford School, a boarding independent school for boys, in the county town of Bedford in Bedfordshire, and read Theology at The Queen's College at the University of Oxford.

== Life and career ==
Brunson began his broadcasting career at the BBC. He joined ITN in 1968 and in 1971 covered the Bangladesh Liberation War and wrote a testimony about the death, starvation and suffering of refugees in West Bengal.

In 1973, Brunson became ITN Washington Correspondent, where he remained until 1977, covering Watergate and the 1976 US presidential election between Jimmy Carter and Gerald Ford. He was ITN Diplomatic Editor from 1978 to 1986, attending every major international summit meeting.

In 1986, Brunson became ITN Political Editor, a role for which he is perhaps best known, and as an occasional ITN newscaster on the-then News at 5:45 and News at Ten.

Brunson retired from ITN in March 2000 after 32 years' service with ITN. Since then, he has regularly appeared as a political commentator on Sky News, GMTV and elsewhere. He was appointed OBE in 2000 and lives in Letheringsett in Norfolk.

Brunson's autobiography, A Ringside Seat, was published in 2000.

== Publications ==
- A Ringside Seat (Hodder & Stoughton Ltd., London, 2000)

Media offices
Preceded by Glyn Mathias	Political Editor of ITN; 1986–2000	Succeeded by John Sergeant
