= Steve Scott (journalist) =

British journalist and presenter

- Born: Stephen James Young Scott; 25 September 1961 (age 64); Stroud, Gloucestershire, England
- Education: Clifton College
- Occupations: Journalist presenter
- Years active: 1989–present
- Employer: ITN
- Spouse: Patricia Yorston
- Relatives: Angus Scott (brother)
- Website: itv.com/news/meet-the-team/steve-scott

Stephen James Young Scott is a British journalist and presenter employed by ITN as the sports editor and newscaster for ITV News.

In 2021, he was named both Broadcast Journalist of the Year and Sports News Reporter of the Year at the annual Sports Journalists' Association Awards.

He won the SJA Broadcast Journalist of the Year award again in 2023.

== Television career ==
Scott began his television career with The West Tonight on ITV West, joining as Industrial Correspondent from local radio station GWR, where he was the news editor and presenter. He joined the ITN produced ITV News in 1993 as the North of England correspondent based in Leeds and West of England correspondent in Bristol. Among stories that Scott covered for ITV News during the 1990s included the Fred and Rose West murders. Scott was part of the reporting teams that covered the Dunblane school massacre and Diana's death. In 1995, he was appointed the Africa Correspondent based in Johannesburg, reporting from many trouble spots including Rwanda, Congo (then Zaire) and Zimbabwe.

In 1997, he moved to 5 News on Channel 5 as the sports presenter. During that time, he fronted more than 100 live European football matches involving British teams. He presented several England international fixtures. He also anchored Moto GP and Rugby Premiership programmes as well as having his own chat show Talk Sport with Steve Scott.

From January 2002, he would present various programmes for BBC Radio 5 Live on a freelance until December 2007.

Between January 2004 and December 2005, Scott presented the ITV News Channel with Felicity Barr, broadcasting on the late afternoon news on weekdays as well as providing an evening service alternating between the two presenters. During this period, he presented the sports segment of the ITV News at 10.30, alternating with Barr.

Since 2005, Scott has been a regular presenter of the ITV Lunchtime News, ITV Evening News and ITV News weekend bulletins on ITV. He was at the forefront of ITV's extended live programming in the aftermath of the terror attacks on the capital. During that time, he also undertook foreign assignments, including Bosnia during the war there and to the United States, where he covered as Washington correspondent on several occasions.

From February 2006, Scott co-presented the main regional news programme The West Tonight on ITV West. Three years later, this programme would merge with Westcountry Live on ITV Westcountry. Scott was retained and presented The West Country Tonight for ITV West Country. He presented his last programme on 7 May 2010. In January 2008, ITV launched a late-night documentary series, Nightwatch with Steve Scott. In accordance with its variations, the programme follows the work of the emergency services and army and analyses mysterious events.

As of 10 May 2010, Scott has been the sports editor for ITV News and has reported the bid for the 2012 Summer Olympics to London. He has acted as a weekly columnist for the Bristol Evening Post.

In 2021, he was named both Broadcast Journalist of the Year and Sports News Reporter of the Year at the annual Sports Journalists' Association Awards. In 2023, he won the Broadcast Journalist of the Year award for a second time.

=== Film ===
He appeared in the 2013 film Thor: The Dark World as himself, the news presenter for ITV. He also had a role in Grimsby. On TV, he has appeared in Unforgotten and Appropriate Adult.

== Personal life ==
Scott was born in Stroud, Gloucestershire. He is married to former presenter Patricia Yorston and they have two children. He is the brother of former Setanta presenter Angus Scott. He is a Bristol City supporter.

== Filmography ==
Years	Programme	Title(s)
1989–1997	The West Tonight	Industrial Correspondent
1993–1995	ITV News	North of England Correspondent; West of England Correspondent
1995–1997	ITV News	Africa Correspondent
1997–2001	5 News	Sports presenter
2004–2005	ITV News at 10.30	Sports presenter
2004–2005	ITV News Channel	Presenter
2005–2015	ITV Lunchtime News'	Relief presenter
2005–2015	ITV Evening News	Relief presenter
2005–2015	ITV Weekend News	Presenter
2006–2009	The West Tonight	Lead presenter
2008–2010	Nightwatch with Steve Scott	Presenter
2008	The Late News	Presenter
2009–2010	The West Country Tonight	Lead presenter
2010–	ITV News	Sports editor
