= Caught on Camera =

Television series

- Genre: Documentary
- Country of origin: United Kingdom
- Original language: English
- No. of episodes: 29

Production
- Running time: 60 minutes (inc. adverts)

Original release
- Network: ITV
- Release: 25 September 2007 – present

Caught on Camera is a British documentary series, which looks at real-life footage, filmed by members of the public.

The cameras used to film this footage, such as CCTV, smartphones, bodycams and dashcams, are everywhere in the United Kingdom, capturing many traditional British events, such as angry moments, car incidents, heroes holding their own against criminals, etc.

Caught on Camera also interviews those involved, regarding these events, including those who are the victims and the heroes, whilst mentioning the results of the events.

== Episodes ==
Title	Original Air Date	Presenter/Narrator	Notes
Shoplifters: Caught On Camera	25 September 2007		
Road Rage Britain: Caught On Camera	9 June 2014		
Unbelievable Moments: Caught On Camera	28 December 2014	Alastair Stewart	
Car Crash Britain: Caught On Camera	5 February 2015	Jamie Theakston	
Car Crash Britain: Caught On Camera	12 February 2015	Jamie Theakston	
Britain Sees Red: Caught On Camera	23 July 2015	Jamie Theakston	
Britain Sees Red: Caught On Camera	30 July 2015	Jamie Theakston	
Unbelievable Moments: Caught On Camera	16 January 2016	Alastair Stewart	
Unbelievable Moments: Caught On Camera	17 January 2016	Alastair Stewart	
Car Crash Britain: Caught On Camera	2 February 2016	Jamie Theakston	
Car Crash Britain: Caught On Camera	9 February 2016	Jamie Theakston	
Heroes and Villains: Caught On Camera	16 February 2016	Jamie Theakston	
Heroes and Villains: Caught On Camera	23 February 2016	Jamie Theakston	
Frustrated Britain: Caught on Camera	1 March 2016	Jamie Theakston	
Frustrated Britain: Caught on Camera	8 March 2016	Jamie Theakston	
Wedding Surprises: Caught on Camera	12 July 2016	Jamie Theakston	
Wedding Surprises: Caught on Camera	19 July 2016	Jamie Theakston	
Holiday Horrors: Caught on Camera	26 July 2016	Jamie Theakston	
Holiday Horrors: Caught on Camera	2 August 2016	Jamie Theakston	
Unbelievable Moments: Caught On Camera	8 January 2017	Alastair Stewart	
Unbelievable Moments: Caught On Camera	26 February 2017	Alastair Stewart	
Car Crash Britain: Caught On Camera	4 May 2017	Jamie Theakston	
Car Crash Britain: Caught On Camera	11 May 2017	Jamie Theakston	
Car Crash Britain: Caught On Camera	25 May 2017	Jamie Theakston	
Holiday Horrors: Caught On Camera	7 June 2017	Jamie Theakston	
Holiday Horrors: Caught On Camera	14 June 2017	Jamie Theakston	
Holiday Horrors: Caught On Camera	21 June 2017	Jamie Theakston	
Holiday Horrors: Caught On Camera	28 June 2017	Jamie Theakston	
Car Crash Britain: Caught On Camera	7 August 2017	Jamie Theakston	
Neighbours from Hell: Caught On Camera	12 August 2019	Stephen Mangan	Series 4 - Episode 5
Neighbours from Hell: Caught On Camera	19 August 2019	Stephen Mangan	Series 4 - Episode 6
