= Mary Nightingale =

English journalist and television presenter

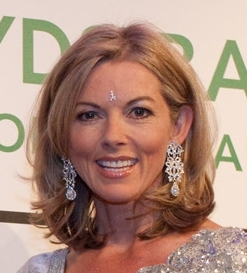
- Nightingale in 2011
- Born: Mary Louise Nightingale; 26 May 1963 (age 63); Scarborough, North Riding of Yorkshire, England
- Education: Bedford College, University of London
- Occupations: Journalist and TV presenter
- Years active: 1990–present
- Employer: ITV News
- Notable credit: ITV Evening News (2001–present )
- Spouse: Paul Fenwick (m. 2000)
- Children: 2

Mary Louise Nightingale (born 26 May 1963) is an English journalist and television presenter. She has presented the ITV Evening News since 2001.

== Education and early career ==
Mary Nightingale was born in Scarborough, the third of four daughters. She moved to Marlow, Buckinghamshire, when she was four and ten years later she moved to Dartmouth, Devon. She was privately educated at Danesfield School in Medmenham, Buckinghamshire, St Margaret's School, an independent school for girls in Exeter, and King Edward VI School in Totnes, Devon. She obtained a BA in English from Bedford College, University of London.

She began her career in journalism as a presenter and writer on World Business Satellite for TV Tokyo. She then went on to work for BBC World's World Business Report as a presenter and writer, covering economic and corporate news. Nightingale also worked for Reuters Financial Television in 1994 as a presenter on an early morning financial programme.

== TV career ==
=== 1990s ===
She co-presented Carlton Country, a factual series about life in the countryside, as well as presenting the Holiday programme on BBC One. In May 1994, she became the first presenter of After 5 the London News Network early-evening show. She worked as co-presenter on ITV's coverage of the 1991 Rugby World Cup, and presented from the 1995 Rugby World Cup in South Africa on the regular evening highlights programme. In 1996, Nightingale presented BBC Two's Ski Sunday.

Until April 1999, Nightingale was co-presenter with Alastair Stewart of London News Network's flagship news programme London Tonight and was the sole presenter of London Today, Carlton's lunchtime news bulletin.

=== 2000s ===
Nightingale anchored ITV's holiday programme Wish You Were Here...? from 1999 to 2001, and also presented The Really Good Food Show.

In 2001, Nightingale was promoted to the ITV Evening News. She was also part of the ITN team covering the 2001 general election.

Nightingale has also fronted various ITV programmes including: Holidays Undercover in 2006, The Girl Who Would Be Queen, and Diana – A Service of Thanksgiving in 2007.

=== 2010s ===
Nightingale was an occasional presenter of the ITV Lunchtime News and ITV News weekend bulletins, and previously acted as a relief presenter on ITV News at Ten before the programme's restructure in October 2015.

In April 2011, she took over from Mark Nicholas as the host of the ITV daytime cookery programme Britain's Best Dish.

On 23 September 2012, she presented William & Kate: The South Seas Tour on ITV.

On 13 December 2016, it was announced Nightingale would become the sole presenter of the ITV Evening News from January 2017 onwards.

== Awards ==
In 2002 and 2004, she won TRIC Awards in the category "Newscaster of the Year".

== Personal life ==
Nightingale married television producer Paul Fenwick, the former Human Resource director of Trailfinders in April 2000 in New York City. The couple have two children and live in Hammersmith, west London.

== Filmography ==
Year	Title	Role
1991, 1995	ITV Sport	Presenter
1994	Reuters Financial Television	Presenter
1994–?	After 5	Presenter
1995	Carlton Country	Presenter
1995	ITN World News Service	Presenter
1995	Soldier Soldier	Newsreader (cameo)
1996	Eye Spy	Presenter
1996	Ski Sunday	Presenter
1997	Thursday Night Live	Guest
1998	Holiday	Presenter
1999	London Tonight	Presenter
1999	Discovery Channel Eclipse 99	Presenter
1999	Really Good Food	Presenter
1999–2001	Wish You Were Here...?	Presenter
1999–2001	ITV Nightly News	Presenter
2000	Aircraft Emergency	Presenter
2000	Call My Bluff	Guest
2001–present	ITV Evening News	Lead presenter
2001	Find Your Family	Presenter
2001–2015	ITV Weekend News	Presenter
2001	Tonight	Reporter
2002	Who Wants to Be a Millionaire?	Guest
2003	Package Holiday Undercover	Presenter
2003–2004	Real Bad Girls	Narrator
2003	Today with Des & Mel	Guest
2004–2008	ITV News at 10.30	Presenter
2004–2005	ITV News Channel	Presenter
2006	Holidays Undercover	Presenter
2006	Steve Irwin Tribute	Narrator
2006	The Year of Weird Weather	Presenter
2007	The Girl Who Would Be Queen	Presenter
2007	Diana – A Service of Thanksgiving	Presenter
2008–2015	ITV News at Ten	Deputy presenter
2009–2015	ITV Lunchtime News	Presenter
2011, 2018	The Royal Wedding	Reporter
2011	Britain's Best Dish	Presenter
2012	The Queen's Diamond Jubilee	Reporter
2012	William & Kate: The South Seas Tour	Presenter
2013	Newsflash: Stories That Stopped the World	Guest
2014	On Assignment	Reporter
2014	Maddie: A Global Obsession	Guest
2015	And Here Is the News...	Guest
2015	Cameraman to the Queen	Guest
2017	Ant & Dec's Saturday Night Takeaway	Guest
2019	Years and Years	Herself
2021	Prince Philip – A Royal Funeral	Reporter
2022	Queen Elizabeth II	Presenter
2022	Queen Elizabeth II – Lying at Rest	Presenter
2022	Queen Elizabeth II: The State Funeral	Presenter

Media offices
Preceded by Kirsty Young	Main Newscaster: ITV Evening News; 2001 – present	Succeeded by Incumbent
