= Carol Barnes =

British newsreader

- Born: Carol Lesley Barnes; 13 September 1944; Norwich, Norfolk, England
- Died: 8 March 2008 (aged 63); Brighton, East Sussex, England
- Occupations: Journalist, newsreader, television presenter
- Years active: 1969–2008
- Spouse: Nigel Thomson (m. 1981)
- Partner: Denis MacShane (1975–1981)
- Children: Clare (1979–2004); James (b. 1982)

Carol Lesley Barnes (13 September 1944 – 8 March 2008) was a British television newsreader and broadcaster. She worked for ITN from 1975 to 2004. She was a regular presenter on the ITN Lunchtime News and News at Ten, and was voted Newscaster of the Year in 1994.

== Early life ==
Barnes was born in Norwich, and attended St Martin-in-the-Fields High School for Girls, Tulse Hill, London. She did not like school, and left at the age of 16, taking a number of jobs for a year, before leaving to study for A levels at a local college of further education. She graduated from Sheffield University with a degree in English, French and Spanish, followed by a postgraduate teaching diploma (PGCE) at the University of Birmingham.

== Career ==
Barnes started her working life as a supply teacher, but decided to switch to a career in media, and held various posts including public relations officer for the Royal Court Theatre in London and sub-editor on the magazine Time Out, before moving into broadcasting, working for Independent Radio News. She was one of the original news team members at the launch of radio station LBC in 1973, and then worked as a reporter for BBC Radio 4 for a year, before joining ITN in 1975.

During her time as an ITN reporter, she covered the Troubles in Northern Ireland, the return of the Iranian spiritual leader Ayatollah Khomeini in 1979, and the Brixton riots in 1981. She made her name as a reporter with ITN on the lunchtime news in the late 1970s, but her first stint as a newscaster came in March 1980 when she began alternating with Michael Nicholson as presenter on the News at 5:45.

Barnes was a regular presenter on the ITN Lunchtime News and ITN's weekend news bulletins from July 1985 until March 1989, and again between January 1991 and 1998. During the intervening period, she was the launch presenter of the Channel 4 Daily breakfast programme. She regularly fronted the ITN flagship News at Ten programme, as well as other current affairs programmes, and in 1994 was voted Newscaster of the Year at the TV and Radio Industries Club Awards.

She left ITN in 1999, and then returned in 2003 to work on their short-lived 24-hour ITV News Channel, until leaving again in 2004. Following her retirement from ITN in 1999, Barnes was a Dictionary Corner guest on the Channel 4 quiz show Countdown for the next couple of years, making 23 appearances on the programme until 2001. Between 1999 and 2001, she occasionally appeared as a relief newsreader on Channel 4's breakfast show The Big Breakfast (the programme replaced The Channel Four Daily, on which Barnes had appeared).

== Personal life ==
Barnes had two children. The elder, Clare, was from her six-year relationship (between 1975 and 1981) with Denis MacShane, later a Labour Foreign Office minister. Clare Barnes was born in 1979 and died in March 2004, aged 24, in a skydiving accident over Barwon Heads, south-west (Note: The preceding BBC article inaccurately describes Barwon Heads as being north-west of Melbourne.) of Melbourne, Australia. Barnes's son James was born a year after she married ITN cameraman Nigel Thomson in 1981.

A keen golfer and one-time qualified private pilot, Barnes resided in Brighton, and became a local magistrate in 1999, until forced to stand down after being convicted of a drink-driving offence in 2004, shortly after her daughter's death.

== Later life and death ==
On 18 January 2008, Barnes presented Saving Ed Mitchell on ITV1, a programme about her former colleague Ed Mitchell's descent into alcoholism.

On 4 March 2008, the Daily Mirror newspaper reported that she had suffered a life-threatening stroke that had left her in a coma. Her doctors did not expect her to recover, and several of her closest friends also voiced these fears. Her son James gave doctors permission to switch off her life support system after they had warned him that there was no reasonable hope that she would recover. While Barnes was dying in hospital, her London flat was burgled.

After Barnes died, The Argus newspaper in Brighton, where she had lived for some years, decided to name their Courageous Child of the Year Award after her. The Carol Barnes Courageous Child of the Year Award is one of around 20 awards given to unsung yet deserving heroes of Sussex at an annual ceremony, hosted by the newspaper.

== Bibliography ==
- Obituary, The Daily Telegraph, 8 March 2008
- Obituary, The Times, 9 March 2008
- Obituary, The Guardian, 10 March 2008
- Obituary, The Independent, 10 March 2008
