= Dermot Murnaghan =

English journalist and broadcaster (1957–2026)

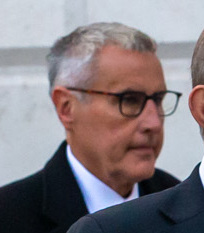
- Murnaghan in 2022
- Born: Dermot John Murnaghan; 26 December 1957; Barnstaple, Devon, England
- Died: 11 July 2026 (aged 68); North London, England
- Education: University of Sussex
- Occupations: Journalist; television presenter
- Years active: 1984–2026
- Employers: Channel 4; CNBC Europe; ITV; BBC; Sky News
- Notable credits: The Business Programme; The Channel Four Daily; ITV Lunchtime News; ITV Evening News; BBC Breakfast; Eggheads; Sky News Today; Are You an Egghead?; Murnaghan; Sky News Tonight
- Children: 4

Dermot John Murnaghan (/ˈmɜːrnəhʊn/; 26 December 1957 – 11 July 2026) was an English media personality notable as a journalist, news reporter, and television host. He presented UK news programmes between 1992 and 2023, where he covered numerous elections and the deaths and funerals of several senior members of the British royal family. One interview, broadcast in December 1998, won him awards from the Royal Television Society and the Television and Radio Industries Club. He also presented Eggheads on and off between 2003 and 2014.

== Biography ==
Murnaghan was born to a Royal Air Force pilot from Northern Ireland and a mother from Yorkshire on 26 December 1957 in Barnstaple, Devon; his 10lb 3oz (4.6 kg) weight made him the hospital's heaviest baby and the subject of local press. He lived with his family in York until he was eight, when his father retired to become a civil engineer and moved the family to Armagh, Newry, and Holywood. Murnaghan studied at Armagh's Catholic primary school St. Malachy's and Holywood's non-denominational grammar school Sullivan Upper before completing a degree in history at the University of Sussex, a master's degree in Irish Chartism from the same institution, and postgraduate training in journalism at City University London.

Murnaghan became interested in television current affairs via the works of W. D. Flackes, reports about NASA moon missions, and the 1967 Six-Day War. He began his journalism career as a trainee reporter with the Coventry Telegraph before being hired by Channel 4's The Business Programme in 1985 as a researcher and then as a reporter. He switched to the channel's Business Daily in 1987 before briefly presenting for the European Business Channel in Switzerland. In 1989, he married journalist Maria Keegan in Camden, with whom had had four children, and he returned to Channel 4 for the Business Daily feature of Channel 4's breakfast programme The Channel Four Daily. He became its lead anchor from 1991. The following year, he began anchoring the channel's weekend news summary bulletins, occasionally covering for Jon Snow as presenter on Channel 4 News.

Following the cancellation of The Channel Four Daily in September 1992, Murnaghan joined ITV to present ITV Lunchtime News from 1993 to 1999, ITV Nightly News for two years, and then ITV Evening News thereafter. A December 1998 interview with Peter Mandelson, who had been accused of failing to tell a mortgage lender about a £400,000 loan he had received from Geoffrey Robinson two years earlier, led to his resignation and Murnaghan winning the Royal Television Society’s Interviewer of the Year Award in 1999 and the Television and Radio Industries Club's Newscaster of the Year Award in 2000. Other content Murnaghan filmed for ITV News included an 18-hour broadcast on 31 August 1997 following the death of Diana, Princess of Wales, for which he had been summoned as he lived close to the studio, and coverage of the Omagh bombing, the budget of the United Kingdom, and the 2001 United Kingdom general election. He also presented the channel's The Big Story from 1993 to 1997, Police Action Live in 1995, and Britain's Most Wanted from 1997 to 2001. He was criticised in 1994 by his cameraman after breaking off from filming a Big Story piece to save the life of a five-year-old boy who had fallen into Lake Geneva while feeding its ducks.

In 2002, Murnaghan left ITV for the BBC and started presenting the corporation's BBC Breakfast, The State We're In, and Treasure Hunt; the latter and lattermost ended in 2003, with Anita Rani presenting State's second series. After starting to host Eggheads in 2003, he appeared as a newsreader in the film Wimbledon in 2004 and then in ChuckleVision and Top Gear in 2007. He left BBC Breakfast for Sky News in 2007 but continued to host Eggheads until 2014, from 2008 in rotation with Jeremy Vine; he also presented Are You an Egghead? in 2008 and Sky News Today from then.

Murnaghan presented a show named after his surname from 2011 to December 2016, the month he represented Sussex University on Christmas University Challenge. His Sky interviews attracted press attention repeatedly towards the end of his tenure; in January 2015 after Chuka Umunna left an interview after objecting to being asked about a letter Eric Pickles had sent about mosques in the UK, in February 2015 after the then-Estonian president Toomas Hendrik Ilves removed his earpiece and told his cameraman to "tell [Murnaghan] to shut up" after Murnaghan addressed him as President Hendrik, in September 2016 after Emily Thornberry accused him of sexism for asking if she knew the name of the French foreign minister, and in December 2016 after Boris Johnson left an interview after being asked if he knew the name of the South Korean president. Murnaghan moved from Sky News Today to Sky News Tonight in late 2016, lasting a matter of months in the role before being temporarily forced off-air in March 2017 after a motorist knocked him off his bicycle and drove off without stopping. He also provided overnight coverage of the 2019 United Kingdom general election and began a five year stint presenting Killer Britain in 2020.

After fronting coverage of the 2020 United States presidential election, the funeral of Prince Philip, Duke of Edinburgh, and the death and state funeral of Elizabeth II for Sky News, he left the channel in February 2023, signing off with an Anchorman: The Legend of Ron Burgundy reference. He then presented Crimes That Shook Britain in 2024 and occasional slots on Times Radio. In late 2024, after struggling with illness throughout a three-week trip to Asia, he went to the A&E department at Whittington Hospital, where he was diagnosed with stage IV prostate cancer; he announced his illness in June 2025, a month into an eight-month stint presenting the podcast Legends of News. He followed his diagnosis by working as an ambassador for Prostate Cancer Research. Murnaghan took part in Chris Hoy's charity bike ride "Tour de 4" in September 2025 and died at his home in North London on 11 July 2026, aged 68; tributes were paid by Andy Burnham, Ed Davey, and various colleagues. A memorial was held at St Bride's Church in October.
