= Charlene White =

British television presenter (born 1980)

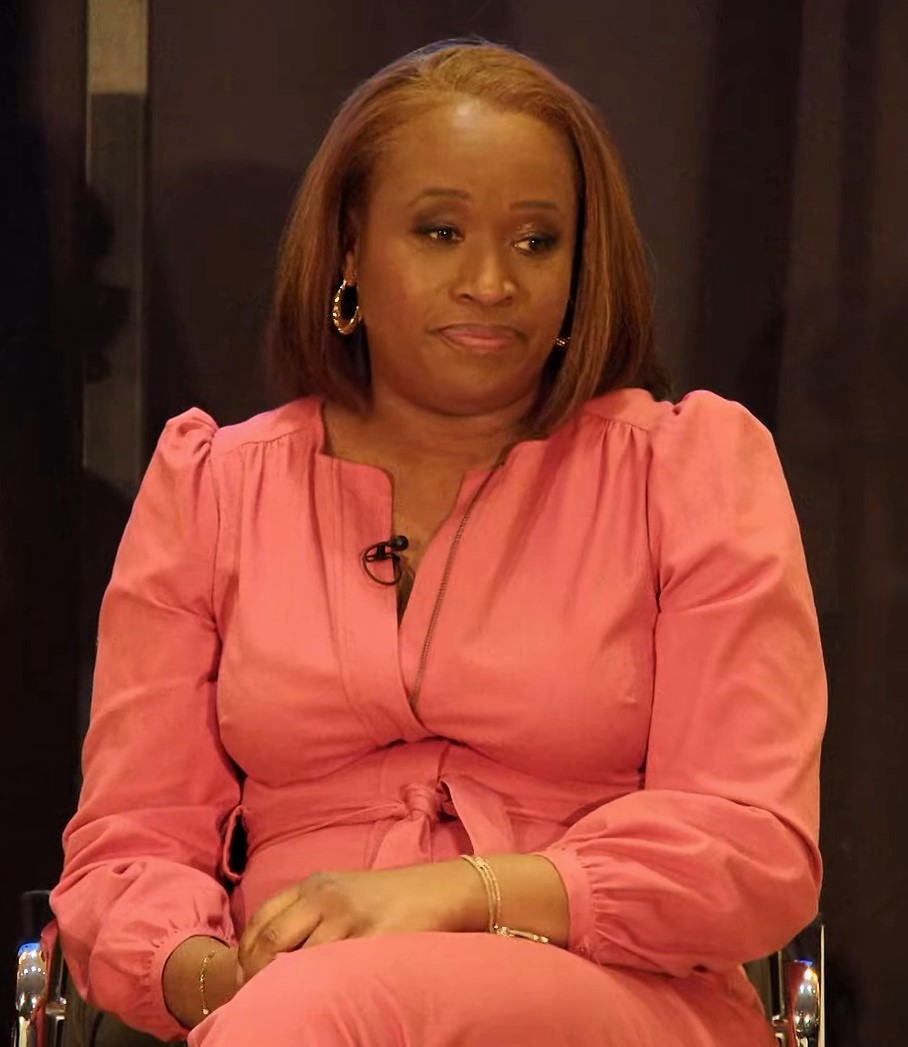
- White at the British Library in 2023
- Born: Charlene Denise White; 22 June 1980 (age 46); Greenwich, London, England
- Occupations: Journalist, presenter
- Employers: ITN (2008–); BBC (formerly)
- Partner: Andy Woodfield (2015–present)
- Children: 2

Charlene Denise White (born 22 June 1980) is a British television broadcaster, journalist and presenter, best known for presenting ITV News programmes. She has been an anchor on Loose Women since 2021. White, Brenda Edwards, Judi Love and Kéllé Bryan became the first all black panel in the show's 25-year history; the panel has featured several times. White also appeared on the ITV reality show I'm a Celebrity...Get Me Out of Here! in November 2022.

== Early life ==
White was born in Greenwich, London, to Jamaican parents. She has a brother and sister. She attended Riverston School and Blackheath High School in southeast London and graduated from the London College of Communication with a degree in Journalism.

== Career ==
White was a presenter and senior broadcast journalist at BBC Look East, Radio 5 Live Morning Reports, BBC Three 60 Seconds and BBC News. She also had her own late-night talk show on BBC London 94.9.

In 2002, she joined Radio 1 Newsbeat and its sister digital station BBC Radio 1Xtra as a reporter. In 2005 she teamed up with DJ G Money as presenter on 1Xtra's two-hour news, magazine and documentary programme TX. She has also previously worked as a reporter and producer for ITV News Meridian on ITV Meridian in Kent.

In 2008, she joined ITN, as a newscaster for the ITV News at 5:30 on ITV. Additionally she would present three short opts which aired as part of GMTV (later Daybreak) for ITV News London on ITV London. She discontinued these roles on 10 October 2012, though remained as a presenter of ITV News London's main 6pm programme.

On 9 April 2014, White became the first black woman to present ITV News at Ten and was an occasional relief presenter until October 2015. She also occasionally presented the ITV Weekend News until 2019.

White continues to act as relief presenter of the ITV Lunchtime News & ITV Evening News.

On 30 May 2019, White was announced as lead presenter of ITV News London's main 6pm programme.

On 12 August 2020, White made her debut as a guest presenter of Loose Women. She returned on 11 January 2021, where it was announced she was to become a regular presenter, following Andrea McLean's departure from the show.

In the 2020 and 2021 editions of the Powerlist, White was listed in the Top 100 of the most influential people in the UK of African/African-Caribbean descent.

In November 2022, White appeared in series 22 of I'm a Celebrity...Get Me Out of Here!. On day 13, White was the first celebrity to be evicted.

As of 2026, White regularly relief presents The National Lunchtime and Evening News Bulletins for ITV, in addition to her regular London Bulletins

== Personal life ==
White lives in south London. White met her partner Andy Woodfield at a friend's party in 2015. They have two children, a son born August 2017 and a daughter born October 2019.

While presenting an ITV News bulletin, she refused to wear a Remembrance Day poppy, stating: "I prefer to be neutral and impartial on screen so that one of those charities doesn't feel less favoured than another." It was reported that following the decision to not wear a poppy, she faced racist and sexist abuse on Twitter.

== Filmography ==
Year	Title	Role
	60 Seconds	Presenter
	BBC Look East	Newsreader/reporter
	ITV News Meridian	Reporter
2008–	ITV News London	Newsreader/presenter
2008–2012	ITV Morning News	Presenter
2014–2015, 2020–	ITV News at Ten	Occasional presenter
2014, 2016	Tonight	Guest reporter
2014–	ITV Lunchtime News	Relief presenter
2014–	ITV Evening News	Relief presenter
2014–2019	ITV Weekend News	Presenter
2020	Have I Got News For You	Panellist
2020	Reporting Coronavirus	Reporter
2020, 2021–	Loose Women	Anchor
2021	Trevor McDonald and Charlene White: Has George Floyd Changed Britain?	Presenter
2021	Charlene White: Empire's Child	Presenter
2021–present	Celebrity Gogglebox	Herself alongside Judi Love
2022	I'm a Celebrity...Get Me Out of Here!	Contestant; Series 22
2024	James Martin's Saturday Morning	Guest

== See also ==
- List of I'm a Celebrity...Get Me Out of Here! (British TV series) contestants
