= Pamela Armstrong =

British journalist and news presenter

Pamela Armstrong (born 25 August 1951 in Kalimantan, Borneo) is a British journalist and news presenter.

== Background ==
Armstrong's career in journalism started with Capital Radio where she presented the daily news and current affairs programme London Today.

She also spent six months reporting on Operation Drake, the expedition that retraced the round-the-world voyage of the great explorer. She sailed in a square-rigged brigantine from Panama to Papua New Guinea taking in the Galapagos, Tahiti and Fiji on the way.

She presented two series of the health programme Wellbeing on Channel 4. It proved highly popular and was one of the channel's earliest successes. She worked for ITN as a newscaster from 1983 to 1986. After leaving ITV in 1986, she joined the BBC where she co-presented Breakfast Time as well as hosting Britain's first chat show to be broadcast five days a week, The Pamela Armstrong Show.

== Education ==
Armstrong was educated in Sarawak, Indonesia and Britain.

== Books ==
Armstrong has written a book, Beating the Biological Clock. She now works as an after dinner speaker and in corporate communications.
