= Sue Carpenter =

British television presenter

- Occupation: Television presenter

Sue Carpenter (born in London, England), is a United Kingdom former newsreader and television presenter.

== Early life ==
She was born in north London.

== Career ==
She started at United Arab Emirates Television. She lived for four years in the Gulf, moving to Dubai.

=== BBC ===
She joined Spotlight, for one week, in July 1983, aged 27, replacing Fern Britton, who had moved to present BBC Breakfast. Carpenter returned to Spotlight in the autumn of 1983.

In the summer of 1983, she presented Points West, with Jane Wales, and returned to Points West in November 1983 for six months. She presented the BBC Holiday programme from 1984 into the 1990s, and Newsview on BBC2.

She worked as a newsreader on Breakfast Time for eighteen months from 1985 until November 1986. She later joined ITN, presenting many of their main bulletins, usually during the daytime and the early evening news.
