= Leonard Parkin =

British journalist (1929–1993)

- Born: 2 June 1929; Thurnscoe, Yorkshire, England
- Died: 20 September 1993 (aged 64); Scarborough, North Yorkshire, England
- Occupation: Newsreader
- Years active: c.1953–1993
- Known for: ITV News (ITN)
- Spouse: Barbara Rowley (m. 1955; sep. 1987)
- Children: 1

Leonard Parkin (2 June 1929 – 20 September 1993) was an English television journalist and newsreader for the BBC and ITN. He began his career as a reporter for local newspapers in Yorkshire before moving to London to work for BBC Radio Newsreel and TV News. Parkin became the BBC's Canadian correspondent in 1960, and three years later was promoted to Washington correspondent. In 1965, he was a reporter on the BBC's current affairs programme Panorama, leaving in 1966 when he was injured in a car accident.

In 1967, he joined ITN and became a newsreader on its half-hour News at Ten bulletin. Parkin took over as the main presenter of ITN's First Report lunchtime current affairs programme and was a regular newsreader on News at One from 1978 to 1987. Between 1978 and 1982, he read the news on the News at 5:45 bulletin. Parkin took early retirement from ITN in July 1987 and went on to create a series of documentaries for Yorkshire Television.

== Early life ==
Parkin was born on 2 June 1929 in Thurnscoe, West Riding of Yorkshire. His father was a coal miner near Pontefract and asked his son not to work in coal mining. Parkin was educated at Hemsworth Grammar School in Yorkshire, and got his start in journalism by writing a regular gossip column for the local paper. He spent his national service in the British Army, rising to the rank of captain.

== Career ==
After leaving school, he began his journalistic career as a reporter at the Wakefield Express weekly newspaper. During his apprenticeship, Parkin worked at the weekly Yorkshire Observer newspaper as a reporter and feature writer, before moving on to the Bradford Telegraph & Argus from 1951 to 1954. Later, he worked as a sub-editor and reporter for the Yorkshire Evening News. He moved to London in 1954 and began working for the BBC as a reporter for the BBC Radio Newsreel and TV News after BBC Television expressed interest in recruiting him when television news was in its infancy. Parkin covered events in Algeria, Australia, France and the Congo.

He became the BBC's Canadian correspondent in 1960, before moving on to become the corporation's Washington correspondent three years later. Parkin covered the John F. Kennedy 1960 presidential campaign, and was one of the first journalists to break the news to the United Kingdom of the Assassination of John F. Kennedy on 22 November 1963. He spent a long time in Dallas covering the trial of Jack Ruby, who shot Kennedy's assassin Lee Harvey Oswald. In 1965, Parkin returned to the United Kingdom from Washington and began working as a reporter for the BBC's current affairs programme Panorama. His time at Panorama was cut short by a car accident in Ireland the following year (while reporting on the 1966 Irish presidential election), which left him with a permanent limp in his right leg and severe facial injuries that took six months to heal. Parkin spent his final year at the BBC working on the current affairs programme 24 Hours before leaving the corporation in 1967.

He was invited to join ITN in 1967 and was one of the original newsreaders for the News at Ten bulletin, which debuted the same year, beginning as the primary support for newsreaders Alastair Burnet and Andrew Gardner in September of that year. Parkin took over as the main presenter of ITN's First Report lunchtime current affairs programme from Robert Kee on 2 February 1976, after deputising for Kee on Fridays. In April 1978, he and Peter Sissons took over as main presenters of ITN's News at One bulletin, replacing Burnet. Parkin worked as a newsreader for the News at 5:45 bulletin from 1978 to 1982. He was the first ITN newsreader to appear on ITV after the network's strike ended on 24 October 1979.

At ITN, Parkin covered the 1968 Summer Olympics in Mexico City. He reported from India and the Middle East and covered major political events such as the 1972 United States presidential election and the 1981 French presidential election. Parkin was also a political interviewer, reported on elections for ITN and anchored special programmes such as the Brighton hotel bombing. He was reporting from Clarence House for ITN's coverage of the Wedding of Prince Charles and Lady Diana Spencer in July 1981. Parkin read bulletins filled with intentional errors for the ITV children's quiz show What's Happening in 1982.

He took early retirement from ITN in July 1987 after ITV moved the News at One bulletin up by half an hour in an attempt to attract more viewers. Parkin returned to Yorkshire, where he produced a series of annual documentaries about the county for Yorkshire Television, titled Pieces of Parkin, which was broadcast on Mondays. Parkin was elected chair of the Welwyn Society in 1967, an organisation that encouraged young people in Welwyn to look beyond the village. He was a member of the Welwyn Film Record Society, the Marylebone Cricket Club, the Lord's Taverners and was president of both the Herts Fly Dressers' Guild and The Lytton Players Stevenage. Parkin was a contributor to sporting magazines.

== Personal life ==
He was a Freemason. Parkin married his wife Barbara Anne Rowley on 4 June 1955; the couple separated in 1987. They had one child. In late 1992, Parkin was diagnosed with spine cancer and underwent chemotherapy while being cared for by his wife. He died from the disease in Scarborough on 20 September 1993. Parkin was cremated privately after his funeral service at St Peter and St Paul's Church, Pickering on the afternoon of 24 September. On 8 December, a memorial service was held for him at St Bride's Church in Fleet Street.

== Legacy ==
The Barnsley Archive and Local Studies Department holds a collection of Parkin's papers in its archives.
