= Chris Ship =

British journalist and newsreader currently ITV Royal Editor

- Born: Christopher Ship
- Occupation: Journalist / Presenter
- Years active: 2008–present
- Known for: Deputy Political Editor, ITV News
- Notable credit: ITV News
- Title: Royal Editor, ITV News

Christopher Ship is an English journalist and presenter, currently working as the ITV News Royal Editor since 2017. He was the former Deputy Political Editor from 2013 to 2017. His position as Deputy Political Editor was filled by current Deputy Political Editor Anushka Asthana.

== Early life and education ==
Ship was brought up in Southampton in Hampshire, and educated at Bellemoor School for Boys (since renamed Upper Shirley High School), a state comprehensive school in the city, where Craig David was a pupil, followed by the University of Sussex, where he studied Media and French.

== Life and career ==
Ship was appointed senior political correspondent for the ITN-produced service in 2008 - promoted from political correspondent, as part of a reshuffle of ITV's political team.

Since early 2009, Ship has been a presenter of the ITV Weekend News.

Ship was given a new title of Deputy Political Editor in 2012.

On 13 December 2016 it was announced Ship is to become Royal Editor from 2017, replacing the retiring Tim Ewart.

Since September 2019 he has also been a occasional relief presenter of the ITV Lunchtime News.
