= Geraint Vincent =

British journalist

Geraint V. Vincent is a British journalist, currently employed by ITN as a Correspondent for ITV News.

== Early life ==
The son of the international relations scholar R J Vincent and Angela Vincent, Vincent and his family lived in Newcastle in Staffordshire for a time; he attended Newcastle-under-Lyme High School from 1985 to 1986. During that time, he played trumpet for the school band. After studying history at the University of East Anglia, he studied journalism at the University of Wales, Cardiff. On graduation he joined BBC Wales as a reporter in Cardiff, reporting for BBC Wales Today. He then joined HTV as Wales Tonight's political correspondent covering the Welsh Assembly. In 2009, Vincent was invited back to his old high school, Newcastle-under-Lyme School, to award school prizes.

== ITN career ==
Vincent joined ITN in April 2002 as a news correspondent for ITV News. He reported on a variety of news events including the Soham murders, the War in Iraq (embedded with the troops), famine in Niger, the 2006 FIFA World Cup in Germany, the 2007 Rugby World Cup, the Beijing 2008 Olympics and the Northern Bank robbery among others. More recently, Geraint has spent time with British forces on active operations in Afghanistan—reporting from the front line of Operation Panther's Claw in the summer of 2009, and Operation Moshtarak in the early months of 2010. He presented ITN's ITV Evening News and ITV News at Ten live from the heart of the so-called Big Freeze in early 2010 and was part of the ITV News team covering the Haiti earthquake 2010.

Vincent's newscasting career began when he was assigned regular presenting duties on the now defunct ITV News Channel. In January 2006, he became a relief newscaster for various ITV News bulletins. As part of the Campaign 2010 and Election 2010 coverage on ITV, Vincent occupied the light hearted role of the 'Campaign Wives Correspondent', closing the ITV News at Ten with "And Finally..." stories for the full length of the election campaign.

He has reported from Afghanistan and in October 2010 reported live on the 2010 Copiapó mining accident.

Vincent now works under the title of Correspondent – previously he was the Middle East Correspondent and prior to that special correspondent for ITV News at Ten. In August 2017 he became a relief presenter for ITV News London on ITV London. He has reported for the current affairs strand, Tonight on ITV.
