= James Mates =

British journalist

- Born: 11 August 1961 (age 65)
- Occupation: Journalist
- Employer: ITN (for ITV News)
- Notable credit: ITV News
- Spouse: Fiona Mates (m. 1991)
- Children: 3

James Mates (born 11 August 1961) is an English newsreader and journalist, currently employed by ITN, where he presents on ITV News and is Europe Editor.

== Education and early career ==
Mates was educated at Marlborough College, an independent school in the market town of Marlborough in Wiltshire. He left Marlborough at the age of sixteen to sit A-levels at Farnham College in Farnham in Surrey and then studied at the University of Leeds from which he graduated, in 1983, with a degree in International History and Politics. During that time he had spent his summer holidays in 1981 working as a researcher for U.S. Republican Senator John Tower on the Senate Armed Services Committee.

== TV career ==
Mates joined ITN in 1983 as an editorial trainee and was appointed scriptwriter in the ITV newsroom two years later. He was made a general reporter at ITN in 1986.

Amongst his first assignments on becoming a reporter was to cover the Zeebrugge ferry disaster. He spent five weeks in Zeebrugge in 1987 during the operation to raise the capsized ferry 'Herald of Free Enterprise'. Another major assignment was to cover the UK's failed extradition attempt from the Republic of Ireland of Father Patrick Ryan in 1989. The failure was attributed to prejudicial comments made in Parliament by his father, Lieutenant Colonel Michael Mates, MP, which implied that Ryan was a terrorist. Prime Minister Margaret Thatcher compounded the damage done by Mates' comments at PMQs on 29 November 1988. In October 1989, the Irish government refused the extradition request on the grounds that Ryan would not get a fair trial in Britain.

In 1989 he was made Tokyo correspondent of the World News on Channel 4's first early morning service, Channel Four Daily. In 1991 Mates was North of England correspondent for ITV, and later that year became Moscow correspondent, a role he kept until 1993. During his time as Moscow correspondent one of Mates' reports, on the use of ice as an anaesthetic in a Russian hospital, was awarded the Prix du Press Club de France at the 7th International Scoop & News Festival of Angers, France. The same story, together with a report on the Russian economy, won Mates a silver medal at the 35th Annual Film & Television Festival of New York City. Between 1993 and 1996 Mates was ITN's Diplomatic Editor.

His many assignments have numbered Kosovo, where he was during the NATO invasion of the country; former Yugoslavia where he covered the 1996 refugee crisis; Moscow during President Yeltsin's attempt to put down the uprising in Chechnya; and Rwanda where he reported on the Central African Republic 's genocidal civil war. As the only television journalist left in the capital Kigali in 1994, Mates watched the city fall to the rebel army of the Rwandan Patriotic Front. He also reported on the slaughter of countless soldiers and civilians and the plight of the 700,000 refugees who fled the carnage. ITV News won a BAFTA for its coverage of the genocide.

He also won a joint Silver Medal from New York for his 1996 coverage of the refugee crisis in former Yugoslavia. Just before covering the war in Rwanda, Mates had been in South Africa reporting on the first-ever democratic elections in the country, which culminated in Nelson Mandela's inauguration as President.

Mates was Washington correspondent between 1997 and 2001. In 2001 he was awarded the title of "Senior Correspondent" for ITV News. In 2001 Mates played a key role in ITV News coverage of the September 11 attacks, reporting from New York and Washington, and the first British journalist on site to report the attacks on the World Trade Center on 9/11.

In January 2012, Mates became "Europe Editor" for ITV News, focussing on the future of the EU and what it means to the UK.

As of 2016, Mates continues as Europe Editor, is making regular appearances on the ITV Weekend News, and is an occasional relief presenter on the ITV Lunchtime News and the ITV Evening News.

== Personal life ==
Mates was raised in Maidenhead, Berkshire and is the son of former Conservative Party MP Michael Mates. He lives in London with his wife Fiona and has three children. Mates enjoys playing bridge with his mates, and plays mostly at the Andrew Robson Bridge Club in west London.
