= Sandy Gall =

British journalist (1927–2025)

Sandy Gall CMG CBE
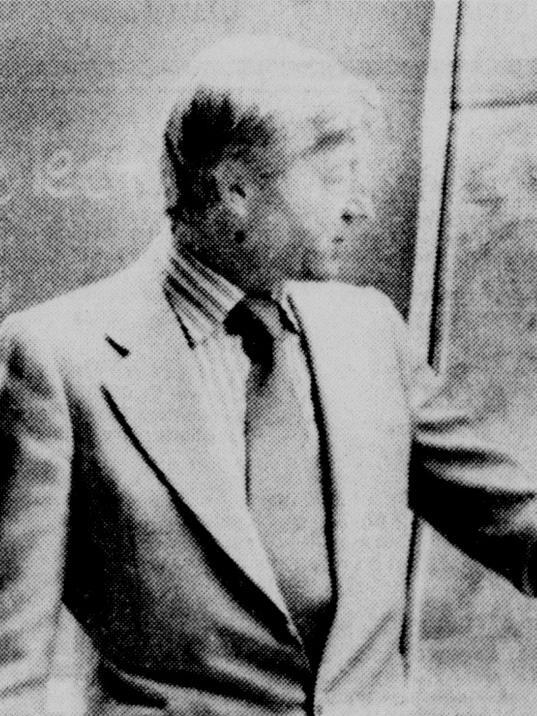
- Gall in 1976
- Born: Henderson Alexander Gall; 1 October 1927; Penang, Straits Settlements, British Malaya
- Died: 29 June 2025 (aged 97); Penshurst, Kent, England
- Education: University of Aberdeen
- Occupations: Journalist; author; news presenter
- Years active: 1953–2021
- Employers: ITN (1963–1992); LBC (after 2003)
- Spouse: Eleanor Smyth (m. 1958; died 2018)
- Children: 4, including Carlotta

Henderson Alexander Gall (1 October 1927 – 29 June 2025) was a Scottish journalist, author and Independent Television News (ITN) news presenter whose career as a journalist spanned more than 50 years. He began his career in journalism as a sub-editor at the Aberdeen Press and Journal in 1952 and became a foreign correspondent for the Reuters international news agency from 1953 to 1963. Gall joined ITN as a foreign reporter and troubleshooter in 1963, and also worked as a newscaster on News at Ten between 1970 and 1991. He was the Rector of the University of Aberdeen from 1978 to 1981 and founded the Sandy Gall's Afghanistan Appeal charity with his wife in 1986.

== Early life and education ==
Henderson Alexander Gall was born as the only child of Scottish parents on 1 October 1927, on a rubber plantation in Penang, Straits Settlements (present-day Malaysia), where his father, Henderson, was a rubber planter. His mother, Jean (née Begg), was a homemaker. When he was four years old, he moved to Scotland and lived with relatives. Gall was educated at Trinity College, Glenalmond, an independent boys' school in Perthshire, where he boarded. He did his national service working as a physical training instructor in the Royal Air Force in Berlin for two and a half years. Gall graduated from the University of Aberdeen in 1952 with a Master of Arts degree in French and German.

== Career ==
In 1952 Gall began his journalistic career as a trainee sub-editor at the Aberdeen Press and Journal. Gall applied to work as a trainee foreign correspondent for the Reuters international news agency and this was accepted in May 1953. He remained at the agency until 1963. Gall covered events in the Congo, East Africa, Germany, Hungary and South Africa. In September 1960, along with the BBC's Richard Williams and the Daily Express's George Gale, he was arrested in Bakwanga in the breakaway province of Kasai whilst reporting on the Congo Crisis on suspicion of being a Belgian spy and for not having official Congolese documentation. The three journalists were released into the custody of Tunisian soldiers attached to the United Nations Operation in the Congo.

Gall joined Independent Television News (ITN) in 1963 as a foreign reporter and troubleshooter, working in Afghanistan, Africa, China, the Far East, the Middle East and Vietnam. He began working as a newsreader on News at Ten in 1970. In 1972 he was arrested in Uganda on the orders of the dictator Idi Amin. Gall was the presenter of the Thames Television programme A Place in Europe from 1975 to 1977 and of the programme Freeze in 1975, examining the aspects of freezers and the foods to store in them. In January 1976 he and a camera operator were briefly detained by the police in Madrid after filming outside a strike-affected Chrysler car factory. Gall narrated the ITV documentary Journey's End on the Vietnamese boat people who had settled at the Thorney Island camp near Portsmouth in 1980.

He reported on the 1980 United States presidential election from the American Embassy in London, and the Wedding of Prince Charles and Lady Diana Spencer from Knightsbridge Barracks in July 1981. In November 1982 he presented the one-hour documentary Afghanistan: Behind Enemy Lines that took two months to produce as he and a film crew covered Afghanistan under the Soviet occupation. Gall was the subject of This is Your Life on 30 March 1983. The following year, he was a contestant on the Channel 4 travel-based quiz programme Where in the World. Gall reported on the Soviet–Afghan War in the documentary Allah Against the Gunships that was broadcast that October.

He was a team captain on the quiz show Television Scrabble in 1985. In the year after, Gall narrated an ITN programme on Sarah, Duchess of York, entitled A Royal Romance, and spent three months filming the documentary Afghanistan; Agony of a Nation that was broadcast in November 1986 because he believed the Soviet-Afghan war was not being reported on correctly. In 1988 he participated in BBC2's International Pro-Celebrity Golf competition, and in the following year, presented the 1989 ITV documentary George Adamson: Lord of the Lions in which he interviewed the conservationist George Adamson.

Gall made his final appearance as a newsreader on News at Ten on 4 January 1991; he returned to a special reporting role in the same month, covering Afghanistan, Africa, the Middle East and Pakistan. He made the decision to retire from ITN in late 1992. He continued working in a freelance capacity in television and writing from 1993 onwards. In 1995 Gall wrote and presented the ITV documentary Network First: The Man Who Saved the Animals that profiled the conservationist Richard Leakey. That same year, he signed up to present the BBC Radio 4 travel programme Breakaway, and the following year, he presented the BBC2 programme The Empty Quarter in which he toured the world's largest sand desert, the Rub' al Khali.

In late 2002, Gall was signed by Channel 5 to present a week of special four-minute reports from Afghanistan on attempts to restore the Buddhas of Bamiyan that were destroyed by the Taliban. He presented a documentary examining the history of Afghanistan from Alexander the Great to the Taliban in the 2004 History Channel documentary Afghanistan: War Without End. Gall was the rector of the University of Aberdeen from 1978 to 1981, and in 1986 he and his wife founded Sandy Gall's Afghanistan Appeal charity to assist in the training of Afghan officials in the provision of artificial limbs and physiotherapy treatment to children and other Afghan civil war victims. He became the World Affairs Expert on the London-based LBC radio station in January 2003.

== Personal life and death ==
Gall met the Foreign Office employee Eleanor Smyth in Budapest in 1956 while he was reporting on the Hungarian Revolution of 1956. They married on 29 August 1958. Eleanor died on 9 September 2018. They had four children, one of whom, Carlotta, is also a journalist.

They separated while he had a two-year affair with a younger woman but they later reconciled.

In June 1972, Gall was injured in a car accident in Bromley, Kent, and suffered facial cuts because he fell asleep while driving. He was fined £25 plus £1 costs.

Gall died at his home in Penshurst, Kent, on 29 June 2025, at the age of 97.

== Honours and awards ==
In 1981, he was made an honorary Doctor of Law by the University of Aberdeen. Gall was awarded the Sitara-e-Pakistan in 1985 and the Lawrence of Arabia Memorial Medal in 1986. He was appointed Commander of the Order of the British Empire (CBE) in 1987. He was appointed Companion of the Order of St Michael and St George (CMG) in the 2011 New Year Honours for services to the people of Afghanistan.

== Publications ==
=== Books ===
- Afghan Napoleon: The Life of Ahmad Shah Massoud (2021), Haus Publishing, ISBN 978-1-913368-22-7
- War Against the Taliban: Why It All Went Wrong (2012), Bloomsbury, ISBN 978-1-4088-0905-1
- The Bushmen of Southern Africa: Slaughter of the Innocent (July 2001), with Charles, Prince of Wales, Chatto and Windus, ISBN 0-7011-6906-0
- News from the Front: A Television Reporter's Life (Feb 1994), William Heinemann, ISBN 0-434-00087-6
- George Adamson: Lord of the Lions (Nov 1991), Grafton, ISBN 0-246-13699-5
- Afghanistan: Travels with the Mujahideen (July 1989), New English Library Ltd, ISBN 0-450-50082-9
- Salang (May 1989), The Bodley Head Ltd, ISBN 0-370-31309-7
- Afghanistan: Agony of a Nation (Feb 1988), with Margaret Thatcher, The Bodley Head Ltd, ISBN 0-370-31135-3
- Behind Russian Lines: An Afghan Journal (Sep 1983), Sidg. & J, ISBN 0-283-99039-2
- Don't Worry About the Money Now (March 1983), H Hamilton, ISBN 0-241-10959-0
- Chasing the Dragon (June 1981), Wm Collins & Sons & Co, ISBN 0-00-222125-X
- Gold Scoop (October 1977), Collins, ISBN 0-00-221355-9

=== Articles ===
- Sandy Gall (1 October 2006). "Unlike Iraq, the Afghan War Is Winnable". The Independent.
- Sandy Gall (17 August 2003). "Blood and Fear in Idi's Jail". The Observer.
- Sandy Gall (15 October 2001). "When David Took on Goliath". New Statesman.

Academic offices
Preceded by Iain Cuthbertson	Rector of the University of Aberdeen; 1978–1981	Succeeded by Robert J. Perryment
