= Romilly Weeks =

British television journalist

- Occupations: Journalist, presenter
- Years active: 1995–present
- Notable credit: ITV News
- Spouse: Nick Green

Romilly Sarah Weeks is an English journalist who is a political correspondent and news presenter for ITV News.

== Media career ==
After a career in acting, Weeks entered broadcast journalism. She has travelled extensively while reporting for ITV News. She was embedded with the British Army during the Second Gulf War, reported from Thailand after the 2004 tsunami, and has covered many royal tours in her role as Royal Correspondent.

During Queen Elizabeth II's 60th wedding anniversary, Weeks was broadcasting live on air when she was surprised by Prince Philip.

In 2003, she became a regular newscaster on the now closed ITV News Channel. From 2006, she combined roles as royal correspondent and news presenter for ITV News; until 2008 she was also a occasional presenter for ITV London. In 2009, she became a News Correspondent, and in 2012, was promoted to political correspondent.

== Personal life ==
Weeks lives in north London with her husband Nick Green, a media consultant.
