= Dave Hewson (composer) =

British composer

- Born: David Graham Hewson; 25 November 1953 (age 72); Wandsworth, London, England
- Occupation: Television composer
- Years active: 1972–present

David Graham Hewson (born 25 November 1953 in Wandsworth, London, England) is a British composer of scores for television and films. His work includes a collaboration to develop scores for ITV News. Hewson works from his composing studio in East Sussex. At Trinity College of Music, Hewson was a pupil of Richard Arnell. They worked together on films including Dilemma (1981), Doctor in the Sky (1984), Toulouse-Lautrec (1986), and The Light of the World (1989). Hewson has written several works with Brian Sibley.

== Background and education ==
Hewson began composing at the age of 11, influenced by his primary school music education, which had been based entirely on the Schulwerk. This influence stayed with David and shaped a lot of his much later music. During his time in primary school, he also started to receive piano lessons from the renowned classical concert pianist and teacher Christine Gough.

In his late teens he studied composition with Professor Richard Arnell, a former pupil of John Ireland at Trinity College of Music, London, and enrolled in a part-time courses on electronic music with Tristram Cary at the Royal College of Music. After gaining his BEd (Hon) he taught music for six years, and during this time built up a large repertoire of compositions, for chamber solo and instrumental combinations including vocal music.

== Compositions ==
His television commissions have covered a wide spectrum. He is mostly called upon to score Drama-Documentary, particularly covering human aspects and emotional content. He is a very prolific writer. His KPM Library music CDs are used all over the world to score an enormous variety of productions. He is also well known for his arrangements and versions of the music for the ITV News at Ten, and all of the regional news broadcast by ITV in England, Southern Scotland, Wales and the Channel Islands. He was commissioned to create the title theme music for the coverage of the wedding of Prince Harry for ITV, and recently was commissioned to provide the title theme music for the ITV coverage of the Funerals of Queen Elizabeth and Prince Philip, and most recently the title music for the Coronation of King Charles and Queen Camilla.

== Awards and nominations ==
David was awarded the Mark Award in 2020 and the Music Production Award in 2019. He was also nominated for the Music and Sound Award in 2021.

=== Overview of works ===
==== Theme tunes and film scores ====
- Central News (Central Television/ITV)
- CNN Future Watch (CNN/Turner Broadcasting System)
- The Selina Scott Show
- Summer with Selik (NRK Norway)
- First Edition (Channel 4)
- English Villages (Reader's Digest)
- The U-Boat War (Discovery Channel)
- If I Ruled the World (BBC)
- The Storm (Channel 4)
- Two the Ends of the Earth (Discovery)
- Mysteries of the Mummies (Discovery)
- Homicide in Kennewick (Channel 4 Equinox)
- The Windsor's (Channel 4)
- In the Footsteps of Elizabeth David (Arts and Entertainment channel)
- Hunting Hitler (Arts and Entertainment channel)
- A Biography of Princess Margaret (Channel 5)
- Air Rage (Channel 5)
- James Bulger (Channel 5)
- Talk TV (Channel 5)
- ITV News at Ten – 1992, 2008 and 2016 (ITN/ITV)
- ITV News – 1995, 1999, 2004, 2006, 2009 and 2013 (ITN/ITV)
- News and Views (ITN News Channel/ITN)
- Self Experimenters (Channel 4 Equinox)
- History of the Future
- Lifeline (Carlton)
- Election 1992 (ITN/ITV)
- Election 2001 (ITN/ITV)
- Election 2005 (ITN/ITV)
- Election 2010 (ITN/ITV)
- Election 2015 (ITN/ITV)
- Don Roaming (Channel 4)
- The Michael Watson Story
- Search for the North West Passage (Channel 4)
- Blitz (Channel 4)
- I Shouldn't Be Alive (Discovery Channel)
- Howard's Way (BBC)
- Morley Brothers (Channel 4)
- Heaven Man Earth (Channel 4)
- Six into One (Channel 4)
- The MTM Story (Channel 4)
- The Scars of War (Channel 4)
- Police Action Live (ITV)
- Century
- Willie's War
- Speed Kings
- BBC Arabic TV and Radio
- Kroll Show (Comedy Central)
- Tonight (ITV)

===== John Halas animated films =====
- Dilemma (with Richard Arnell)
- Doctor in the Sky (with Richard Arnell)
- Toulouse-Lautrec (with Richard Arnell)
- Light of the World (with Richard Arnell)
- Electronic Animation (with Richard Arnell)

==== Some of Dave Hewson's production music albums ====
- KPM 757 Man, Myth & Magic
- KPM 754 Music for Documentaries
- JM 40 Stratovarios
- KPM 689 Close to the Edge
- JM 17 Global Warming
- KPM 587 New Directions
- KPM 557 Science of Uncertainty
- KPM 502 Metamorphosis 5
- KPM 503 Metamorphosis 6
- KPM 392 Metamorphosis 1
- KPM 393 Metamorphosis 2
- KPM 354 Beatspeak
- KPM 317 Horror, Mystery & Imagination – 1
- KPM 318 Horror, Mystery & Imagination – 2
- KPM 319 Horror, Mystery & Imagination – 3
- KPM 273 The Human Experience Part 1
- KPM 274 The Human Experience Part 2
- KPM 270 Textures
- KPM 237 Media Themes
- KPM 225 Research and Development Part 2
- KPM 200 Disappearing Earth
- KPM 185 Research and Development
- KPM 176 Classic Fantastic
- KPM 156 the Competitive Edge KPM 462 20th Century Sketchbook
- KPM 410 The Dark Side – Part 1
- KPM 513 Observing Eye

==== Concerts ====
- Concerto for Oboe - Sinfonia Serenata written for the Oboist Philip Cull
- War God II (Richard Arnell) at St. John's Smith Square, London (contributor)
- Twenty-Four Hours in TT Scale (co-writer with Richard Arnell)

==== Works with author and broadcaster Brian Sibley ====
- The Man and the Snake
- Nostradamus
- The Autumn People (public performance at the BMIC)
- The Fox at the Manger (BBC Radio 4)
- Miss Hargreaves (BBC Radio 4)

==== Producer ====
Dave Hewson has worked extensively as a music producer and performer notably for:

- Amii Stewart
- Jaki Graham
- Anita Dobson
- Marti Webb
- Simon May
- Two Minds Crack
- Bogart Co

==== Poeme Electronique ====
In the 1980s, Dave Hewson created an electronic trio with Sharon Abbott and Julie Ruler called Poeme Electronique. "The Echoes Fade", the one and only single they released, is widely considered to be the "holy grail" of minimal electronic music, with rare copies often selling for hundreds of pounds.

==== Twins Natalia ====
Twins Natalia are an electro-pop group combining an early '80s musical approach (analogue drum machine sounds, way of sequencing, etc.) with the latest recording technology. Poeme Electronique are involved with the group, with additional compositions, arrangements and performances by Dave Hewson in his recording studio in East Sussex, and with lyrics added by Sharon Abbott, performed by both Sharon and Julie Ruler.

==== Techno Twins ====
Hewson was a key contributor to the musical output of the Techno Twins in the 1980s, writing and creating most of their material for several albums. He performed on many of their other recordings and was integral in the creation of the only hit they had, "Falling in Love Again". He invented their unique sound concept and arrangements, all created in his four track studio in south London.
