= Potency (pharmacology) =

Measure of drug activity

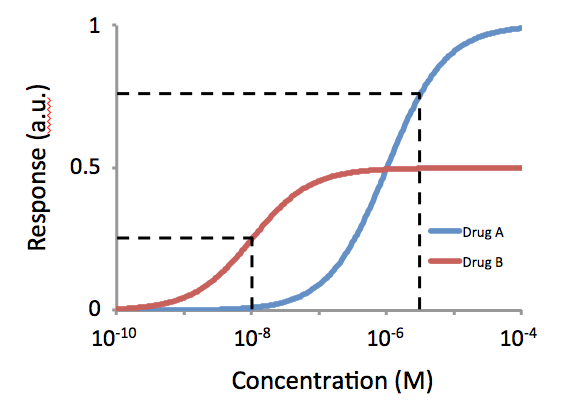
Concentration-response curves illustrating the concept of potency. For a response of 0.25a.u., Drug B is more potent, as it generates this response at a lower concentration. For a response of 0.75a.u., Drug A is more potent. a.u. refers to "arbitrary units".

In pharmacology, potency or biological potency is a measure of a drug's biological activity expressed in terms of the dose required to produce a pharmacological effect of given intensity. A highly potent drug (e.g., fentanyl, clonazepam, risperidone, benperidol, bumetanide) evokes a given response at low concentrations, while a drug of lower potency (e.g. morphine, diazepam, ziprasidone, haloperidol, furosemide) evokes the same response only at higher concentrations. Higher potency does not necessarily mean greater effectiveness nor more side effects nor less side effects.

== Types of potency ==
The International Union of Basic and Clinical Pharmacology (IUPHAR) has stated that "potency is an imprecise term that should always be further defined", and lists of types of potency as follows:

Type of potency	Symbol	Definition
Effective dose	$\ce{ED_{50}}$	It is the minimum dose or concentration of a drug that produces a biological response in 50% of a population being studied.
Median lethal dose	$\ce{LD_{50}}$	For either drugs or toxins, it is a toxic unit that measures the minimum dose that causes death (lethal dose) in 50% of cases.
Median toxic dose	$\ce{TD_{50}}$	It is the minimum dose at which toxicity occurs in 50% of cases.
Half maximal effective concentration	$\ce{EC_{50}}$	It is a measure of the concentration of a drug, antibody or toxicant which induces a biological response halfway between the baseline and maximum after a specified exposure time. In other words, it can be defined as the concentration required to obtain a 50% effect.
Half maximal inhibitory concentration	$\ce{IC_{50}}$	It is a measure of the potency of a substance in inhibiting a specific biological or biochemical function.

== Miscellaneous ==
Lysergic acid diethylamide (LSD) is one of the most potent psychoactive drugs known, with effects occurring at doses of as low as 20 μg.

== See also ==
- Reaction inhibitor § Potency
