= Central Advisory Councils for Education =

British statutory bodies (1944–1968)

Central Advisory Councils for Education (separate councils for England & Wales)
Statutory Advisory Councils overview
- Formed: 1945
- Preceding Statutory Advisory Councils: The Consultative Committee set up under the Board of Education Act 1899.
- Dissolved: 1967–1968
- Superseding Statutory Advisory Councils: Multitude of non-statutory advisory bodies
- Jurisdiction: England & separately Wales
- Status: Defunct
- Motto: f
- Parent department: Ministry of Education
- Key document: Section (4) of the Education Act (1944)

Section 4 of the Education Act 1944 set-up two Central Advisory Councils for Education, one for England and one for Wales and Monmouthshire. The purpose of the councils was to advise the Minister of Education upon matters connected with educational theory and practice, the advices were used to refine educational policy and develop educational institutes. Starting with a terms of reference, the councils would carryout an enquiry and produce a report which would be submitted to the Minister of Education who could choose to publish the report.

== Purpose of the councils ==
Timeline for English Council
← / Rab Butler appoints inaugural council; ← / 1st Clarke Report; ← / 2nd Clarke Report; ← / Gurney-Dixon Report; ← / Sir David Eccles reconstitutes council; ← / Crowther Report; ← / Sir David Eccles reconstitutes council; ← / Newsom Report; ← / Sir Edward Boyle reconstitutes council; ← / Plowden Report; ← / Education Act Passed
Timeline for the Central Advisory Council for Education (England)

Rab Butler who was responsible for passing the Education Act 1944 (aka the Butler Act), elaborated on the purpose of the councils when the bill was moved for a second reading in parliament:

the Minister is to be advised by two councils whose establishment is an earnest of our intention that the central Ministry shall not only gird on the sword of resolution, but shall hold aloft the torch of true learning.

— Rab Butler, President of the Board of Education, Hansard 19th January 1944 - Volume 396 - Column 210

To "hold aloft the torch of true learning" metaphorically described the outcome from applying current educational theory and best practice to improve education. To achieve such an outcome, evidence & research based advice was needed to influence government thinking, justify policy change, and set priorities so leading to the reallocation of resources used for education. The enquiries by the councils followed by the publication of their findings in reports were simply the first step to achieving the change needed to improve children's lives for the better.

The reports, socialised out the current practices in education, both good and bad. They often legitimised some sensible ideas for educational change which were previously considered radical & progressive by the educational establishment. They had an unequalled ability to obtain a broad consensus for change across both the public and education profession. They established a blueprint for best practice and encouraged its adoption and they set parents expectations for the education of their children. Most importantly of all, they economically demonstrated the relationship between education and growth which helped to justify the significant post-war expansion in public education services. The reports often achieved their aims slowly by influencing government though exerting political pressure and extracting commitments which eventually led to the change needed to improve the lives of children.

The councils were learned, independent and respected. They received and absorbed evidence across a diverse range of opinions and undertook detailed research and surveys to support their findings. The result was the reports often became the definitive documents on a particular education service and were sometimes best sellers in their own rights.

To this purpose and over their 22-year lifespan, the councils investigated some of the most pertinent educational questions of the time with the results of their most important enquiries being published in reports by His Majesty's Stationery Office (HMSO). In addition the Ministry of Education sometimes received advice in the form of reports from the councils but then chose not to publish, these are on public records at the National Archives in Kew.

== Composition of the Councils ==
The Minister of Education appointed the chairman & members for each council and supplied the secretariat from the Ministry of Education. The Education Act obliged the minister to appoint both persons who had experience of the public education system as well as persons who had an experience of educational institutions not forming part of that system, (Note: Kogan suggested that the appointment of outsiders was intended to prevent an echo chamber affect otherwise the prevailing view in the education profession may simply be echoed by the council.) the original aim was to enlist the help of representatives of different aspects of the national life, whether they be industrial, scientific or cultural. This resulted in an eclectic mix of people on the council as evidenced by the membership of the inaugural English council, which was appointed by Rab Butler, the first Minister of Education: -

Inaugural (1945) Central Advisory Council for Education (England)
Name	Role	Position	Representing
Sir Fred Clarke	Chairman	Director of the Institute of Education in the University of London	Educationalists & Academics
Mr. W. O. Lester Smith	Member	Director of Education, Manchester.	Educationalists & Academics
Sir Charles Darwin, K.B.E., M.C., F.R.S.	Member	Director, National Physical Laboratory	Educationalists & Academics
Sir Henry Clay	Member	Principal, Nuffield College, Oxford	Educationalists & Academics
Professor B. Dobrée, O.B.E.	Member	Professor of English Literature, Leeds University	Educationalists & Academics
Professor R. A. B. Mynors	Member	Professor of Latin, University of Cambridge.	Educationalists & Academics
Professor Willis Jackson	Member	Professor of Electro-Technics, University of Manchester.	Educationalists & Academics
Professor J. A. Scott-Watson, C.B.E.	Member	Chief Education and Advisory Officer, Ministry of Agriculture.	Educationalists & Academics
Miss M. F. Adams	Member	Headmistress Croydon High School for Girls	Practitioners Inside the Public Education System
Mr. J. F. Wolfenden, C.B.E.	Member	Headmaster, Shrewsbury School.	Practitioners Inside the Public Education System
Mr. Ronald Gould	Member	Headmaster, Welton School, Somerset	Practitioners Inside the Public Education System
Miss E. Dodds	Member	Warden, Bishop Creighton House, Fulham	Practitioners Inside the Public Education System
Lady Allen of Hurtwood	Member	Chairman of the Nursery School Association of Great Britain	Practitioners Inside the Public Education System
Dr. C. F. Brockington	Member	School Medical Officer, Warwickshire County Council.	Practitioners Inside the Public Education System
The Right Reverend the Lord Bishop of Bristol	Member	Secretary, Council of Church Training Colleges, and Christian Education Movement.	Educators Outside the Public Education System
Rev. Dr. A. W. Harrison (Note: Rev. Dr. Archibald Harrison died in 1946 whilst a sitting member of the English council)	Member	Secretary, Methodist Education Committee.	Educators Outside the Public Education System
Lieutenant-Colonel the Honourable N.A.S. Lytton-Milbanke	Member	National Catholic Youth Association.	Educators Outside the Public Education System
Sir Phillip Morris, C.B.E.	Member	Director-General of Army Education.	Educators Outside the Public Education System
The Honourable Mrs. Youard.	Member	Rural Education.	Educators Outside the Public Education System
Mr. Harold Clay	Member	Transport and General Workers' Union	Employers & Unions
Sir Claude Gibb, F.R.S.	Member	General manager and Director of C. A. Parsons & Co. Ltd.	Employers & Unions
The Honourable Josiah Wedgwood	Member	Managing Director, Josiah Wedgwood & Sons Ltd.	Employers & Unions
Miss M. S. Smylie	Secretary	Ministry of Education, H.M. Inspector	Secretariat
Miss J. M. Crafter	Assistant	Secretary	Secretariat
Miss M. E. Forsyth	Clerk	Clerk	Secretariat

=== History ===
The constitution of the councils only changed organically over the first decade as originally the tenure of membership was set on a rotating basis allowing for some change to the council composition whilst still ensuring continuity, this organic change included the fact some councillors resigned of their own volition or died and those vacancies were filled, during this historical phase there was only one change in chairman as Sir Fred Clark was replaced by Samuel Gurney-Dixon.

This way of operating changed in 1956 when Sir David Eccles started to re-constitute the main English councils for each new enquiry, subsequently it was reconstituted 3 times by the Education Minister of the time: -

- In March 1956, by the minister, Sir David Eccles under the new chairman, Sir Geoffrey Crowther
- In March 1961, by the minister, Sir David Eccles under the new chairman, Lord Amory, who resigned during his tenure forcing the vice-chairman, John Newsom to then step-up to chairman
- In August 1963, by the minister Sir Edward Boyle under the new chairwoman, Lady Bridget Plowden, with John Newsom dropping back down to vice-chairman.

== Organisation ==
The councils were public bodies within the government of the United Kingdom, for context : -

1. The role of Minister of Education was created under the Education Act.
2. The Prime Minister appointed a member of parliament to the role.
3. The Education Minister produced an annual report for parliament.
4. The Education Minister was scrutinised by parliament and its committees.

The two advisory councils fitted into this organisation as follows: -

1. The central advisory councils were created under the Education Act so they were statutory.
2. The Education Minister appointed the chair and members of the council.
3. The Education Minister provided terms of reference for the enquiries.
4. The councils could also set their own terms of reference and could make independent enquiries as they saw fit.
5. By statute the annual report of the Ministry of Education included information on the workings of the councils.
6. This information enabled parliament and its committees to scrutinise the work of the councils.

This model resulted in the councils being partially autonomous rather than completely sub-ordinate to the Minister of Education.

Education Act
Legend: -

Prime Minister	Parliament
Minister of Education	Parliamentary Report
Enquiry Remits
Central Advisory Councils
Own Remits
Sub-Committees
Written Artefacts	Government Bodies

== Remits of the published enquiries ==
Each of the enquiries undertaken by the councils were under a terms of reference (aka remit) which defined the scope & bounds of each enquiry. The councils either enquired on the questions raised by the minister or on questions independently identified by the councils themselves.

Remits for the Published Enquiries Undertaken by the Central Advisory Council for Education (England)
Enquiry	Date of Inception	Chairman of Council at Inception	Education Minister at Inception of Enquiry	Enquiry Incepted by	Terms of Reference
School and Life	1944	Sir Fred Clarke	Rab Butler	Council with the agreement of the minister	"The subject to which the Council proposes to address itself first is the transition from life at school to independent life. It will examine the content and methods of education in those schools from which the actual transition is made, and proceed to the influence of earlier education from the nursery school onwards, and at the other end of the scale to the special problems of part-time education. The general purpose of the enquiry will be an appreciation and criticism of existing education as a preparation for a useful and satisfying life."
Out of School	1947	Sir Fred Clarke	George Tomlinson	Minister of Education	"To consider and report on the natural interests and pursuits of school children out of school hours; the provision made for these outside their homes; the value of such provision and the desirability of further or different provision; and the extent to which school work and activities can and should be related to and develop these interests."
Early leaving	1952	Sir Samuel Gurney-Dixon	Florence Horsbrugh	Minister of Education	'To consider what factors influence the age at which boys and girls leave secondary schools which provide courses beyond the minimum school-leaving age; to what extent it is desirable to increase the proportion of those who remain at school, in particular the proportion of those who remain at school roughly to the age of 18; and what steps should be taken to secure such an increase.'
15 to 18	1956	Sir Geoffrey Crowther	Sir David Eccles	Minister of Education	"To consider, in relation to the changing social and industrial needs of our society, and the needs of its individual citizens, the education of boys and girls between 15 and 18, and in particular to consider the balance at various levels of general and specialised studies between these ages and to examine the inter-relationship of the various stages of education". This was extended by the education minister (Lord Hailsham) on 1 July 1957 through issuance of circular 326: - "to consider whether any, and if so, what arrangements should be made for the examination of those secondary school pupils for whom the General Certificate of Education was recognised to be inappropriate"
Half Our Future	1961	Lord Amory	Lord Eccles	Minister of Education	Original: - 'To consider the education between the ages of 13 and 16 of pupils of average or less than average ability who are or will be following full-time courses either at schools or in establishments of further education. The term education shall be understood to include extra-curricular activities.'
Children and their Primary Schools	1963	Lady Plowden JP	Sir Edward Boyle	Minister of Education	'To consider primary education in all its aspects and the transition to secondary education'

=== Own remits ===
The unique difference between the councils and the commission which proceeded it or the committees which followed was the ability to set its own terms of reference, independently of the minister of education.

== Major published reports ==
=== English publications ===
The following are the six reports published by the English council: -

Date	Report Title	Parts	Pages	Chairman at Publication	Minister of Education at Publication
1947	School and Life	One Part	96	Sir Fred Clarke	Ellen Wilkinson (Note: Ellen Wilkinson died whilst in office shortly after receipt of the report and her successor George Tomlinson published in her stead)
1948	Out of School	One Part	519	Sir Fred Clarke	George Tomlinson
1954	Early leaving	One Part	99	Sir Samuel Gurney-Dixon	Florence Horsbrugh
1959	15 to 18	Volume I - The Report	519	Sir Geoffrey Crowther	Geoffrey Lloyd
1960	15 to 18	Volume II - The Surveys	240	Sir Geoffrey Crowther	Geoffrey Lloyd
1963	Half Our Future	One Part	298	John Newsom CBE	Edward Boyle
1967	Children and their Primary Schools	Volume I - The Report	555	Lady Plowden JP	Anthony Crosland
1967	Children and their Primary Schools	Volume II - The Research & Surveys	633	Lady Plowden JP	Anthony Crosland

=== Welsh publications ===
The following are the ten reports published by the Welsh council: -

Date	Language	Report Title	Pages	Chairman
1949	English & Welsh	The Future of Secondary Education in Wales	160	Professor Richard Aaron
1951	English & Welsh	The county college in Wales: Y coleg sir yng Nghymru!.	126	Professor Richard Aaron
1953	English	Arts in Education; Music in the Schools of Wales	53	(not named in bibliography)
1953	English	The Place of Welsh and English in the Schools of Wales (Note: Both an English & Welsh summary (69 pages) of this report was also produced)	110	(not named in bibliography)
1954	English & Welsh	The Arts in Education; Drama in the Schools of Wales	53	A.B. Oldfield-Davies
1956	English & Welsh	Arts in Education; Art and Crafts in the Schools of Wales	88	A.B. Oldfield-Davies
1960	English & Welsh	Education in Rural Wales	168	A.B. Oldfield-Davies
1961	English & Welsh	Technical Education in Wales	146	A.B. Oldfield-Davies
1965	English & Welsh	Science in Education in Wales Today	169	Llewellyn-Jones, F.
1967	English	Primary Education in Wales (Note: This report was published late enough to have an ISBN)	646	Charles Gittins
1967	Welsh	Addysg Gynradd Cymru	668	Charles Gittins

== Unpublished enquiries ==
Timeline for Welsh Council
← / Rab Butler appoints inaugural council; ← / Report; - The Future of Secondary Education in Wales; ← / Report; - The county college in Wales; ← / Report; - Music in the Schools of Wales; ← / Report; - The Place of Welsh and English in the Schools of Wales; ← / Report; - Drama in the Schools of Wale; ← / Report; - Art and Crafts in the Schools of Wales; ← / Report; - Education in Rural Wales; ← / Report; - Technical Education in Wales; ← / Report; - Science in Education in Wales Today; ← / Report; - Primary Education in Wales
Timeline for the Central Advisory Council for Education (Wales)

=== England ===
The English council additionally completed five enquiries where the Minister of Education chose not to publish the reports, also one enquiry completed but with just a memoranda and one enquiry was not completed: -

- 1947 - 1948; - Education of the young worker (report produced - unpublished).
- 1948 - 1951; - The crisis in the primary school (report produced - unpublished).
- 1949 - 1949; - County College (memoranda produced - unpublished).
- 1948 - 1950; - Relations between technical and general education.
- 1951 - 1954; - Premature leaving from secondary schools (report produced - unpublished).
- 1949 - 1952; - The relation between school and university (report produced - unpublished).
- 1950 - 1954; - The age of compulsory school attendance (report produced - unpublished).

=== Wales ===
The Welsh council was smaller than its larger English counter-part and dealt with less significant enquiries but all ten of its enquiries resulted in reports which were all published.

== Dissolution ==
After the issuance of the Plowden report, the final meeting of the central advisory council for education (England) was held on 16 October 1966, with the tenure of all the members allowed to expire on 30 November 1966. Similarly, after the issuance of the Gittins report, the equivalent council for Wales met in March 1967 and the tenure of their members was also allowed to expire shortly afterwards. Neither council was ever re-constituted again but the statute under which they were instituted [section (4) of the Education Act 1944] remained in law until finally repealed on 1 November 1996.

=== Replacement bodies ===
The educational advisory function was instead carried out by a multitude of non-statutory advisory bodies who were indirectly constituted at the behest of Ministers rather than being constituted directly under an act of parliament as were the two councils. In 1971, the Secretary of State for Education & Science (Margaret Thatcher) explained the change to the 'advisory machinery' and named many of the bodies who had replaced the work done by the two statutory advisory councils: -

Permanent (standing) advisory councils with thematic remits: -

- Established 1948; - National Advisory Council on Education for Industry and Commerce
- Established 1958; - National Advisory Council on Art Education
- Established 1964; - The Schools Council
- Established 1967; - The National Council for Educational Technology

Ad-hoc (expert) committees with single issue remits: -

- Reported 1955; - Underwood Committee on Maladjusted Children
- Reported 1960; - Anderson committee on awards to students
- Reported 1960; - Albemarle committee on the youth service
- Reported 1963; - Robbins committee on higher education
- Reported 1968; - Summerfield Committee on psychologists in education services
- Reported 1972; - James Committee on teacher training
- Reported 1973; - Russell Committee on adult education

=== Reasons for replacement ===
The reasons the statutory councils were dissolved and replaced by non-statutory advisory bodies were manifold. Some education ministers such as Anthony Crosland, did not want an independent body contemplating the long-term vision needed for education instead the ministry of education under political control should carryout this fundamental activity and so the internal advisory capability of the ministry was improved. By their nature, the reports were often publicly critical of the status quo which was often construed as criticism of the education minister which was not appreciated. Ministers no longer considered it necessary for the councils to come-up with their own terms of reference and they were not keen on funding such work. The councils were subject to statutory reporting which led to more parliamentary scrutiny than with non-statutory advisory bodies.
