= Lethal dose =

Sufficient amount to kill

In toxicology, the lethal dose (LD) is an indication of the lethal toxicity of a given substance or type of radiation. Because resistance varies from one individual to another, the "lethal dose" represents a dose (usually recorded as dose per kilogram of subject body weight) at which a given percentage of subjects will die. The lethal concentration is a lethal dose measurement used for gases or particulates. The LD may be based on the standard person concept, a theoretical individual that has perfectly "normal" characteristics, and thus not apply to all sub-populations.

== Median lethal dose (LD_{50}) ==
The median lethal dose, LD_{50} (abbreviation for "lethal dose, 50%"), LC_{50} (lethal concentration, 50%) or LCt_{50} (lethal concentration and time) of a toxin, radiation, or pathogen is the dose required to kill half the members of a tested population after a specified test duration. LD_{50} figures are frequently used as a general indicator of a substance's acute toxicity. A lower LD_{50} is indicative of increased toxicity.

=== History ===
The test was created by J.W. Trevan in 1927. The term "semilethal dose" is occasionally used with the same meaning, in particular in translations from non-English-language texts, but can also refer to a sublethal dose; because of this ambiguity, it is usually avoided. LD_{50} is usually determined by tests on animals such as laboratory mice. In 2011 the US Food and Drug Administration approved alternative methods to LD_{50} for testing the cosmetic drug Botox without animal tests.

=== Units and measurement ===
The LD_{50} is usually expressed as the mass of substance administered per unit mass of test subject, typically as milligrams of substance per kilogram of body mass, but stated as nanograms (suitable for botulinum), micrograms, milligrams, or grams (suitable for paracetamol) per kilogram. Stating it this way allows the relative toxicity of different substances to be compared, and normalizes for the variation in the size of the animals exposed, although toxicity does not always scale simply with body mass.

The choice of 50% lethality as a benchmark avoids the potential for ambiguity of making measurements in the extremes and reduces the amount of testing required. However, this also means that LD_{50} is not the lethal dose for all subjects; some may be killed by much less, while others survive doses far higher than the LD_{50}. Measures such as "LD_{1}" and "LD_{99}" (dosage required to kill 1% or 99%, respectively, of the test population) are occasionally used for specific purposes.

Lethal dosage often varies depending on the method of administration; for instance, many substances are less toxic when administered orally than when intravenously administered. For this reason, LD_{50} figures are often qualified with the mode of administration, e.g., "LD_{50} i.v."

The related quantities LD_{50}/30 or LD_{50}/60 are used to refer to a dose that without treatment will be lethal to 50% of the population within (respectively) 30 or 60 days. These measures are used more commonly with radiation, as survival beyond 60 days usually results in recovery.

==== Estimation using model organisms ====
LD values for humans are best estimated by extrapolating results from human cell cultures. One form of measuring LD is to use model organisms, particularly animals like mice or rats, converting to dosage per kilogram of biomass, and extrapolating to human norms. The degree of error from animal-extrapolated LD values is large. The biology of test animals differs in important aspects to that of humans. For instance, mouse tissue is approximately fifty times less responsive than human tissue to the venom of the Sydney funnel-web spider. The square–cube law also complicates the scaling relationships involved. Researchers are shifting away from animal-based LD measurements in some instances. The U.S. Food and Drug Administration has begun to approve more non-animal methods in response to animal welfare concerns.

=== Median infective dose ===
The median infective dose (ID_{50}) is the number of organisms received by a person or test animal qualified by the route of administration (e.g., 1,200 org/man per oral). Because of the difficulties in counting actual organisms in a dose, infective doses may be expressed in terms of biological assay, such as the number of LD_{50}'s to some test animal. In biological warfare infective dosage is the number of infective doses per minute for a cubic meter (e.g., ICt_{50} is 100 medium doses - min/m^{3}).)

== Lowest lethal dose ==
The lowest lethal dose (LD_{Lo}) is the least amount of drug that can produce death in a given animal species under controlled conditions. The dosage is given per unit of bodyweight (typically stated in milligrams per kilogram) of a substance known to have resulted in fatality in a particular species. When quoting an LD_{Lo}, the particular species and method of administration (e.g. ingested, inhaled, intravenous) are typically stated.

== Median lethal concentration ==
For gases and aerosols, lethal concentration (given in mg/m^{3} or ppm, parts per million) is the analogous concept, although this also depends on the duration of exposure, which has to be included in the definition. The term incipient lethal level is used to describe a LC_{50} value that is independent of time.

A comparable measurement is LCt_{50}, which relates to lethal dosage from exposure, where C is concentration and t is time. It is often expressed in terms of mg-min/m^{3.} LCt_{50} is the dose that will cause incapacitation rather than death. These measures are commonly used to indicate the comparative efficacy of chemical warfare agents, and dosages are typically qualified by rates of breathing (e.g., resting = 10 L/min) for inhalation, or degree of clothing for skin penetration. The concept of Ct was first proposed by Fritz Haber and is sometimes referred to as Haber's law, which assumes that exposure to 1 minute of 100 mg/m^{3} is equivalent to 10 minutes of 10 mg/m^{3} (1 × 100 = 100, as does 10 × 10 = 100).

Some chemicals, such as hydrogen cyanide, are rapidly detoxified by the human body, and do not follow Haber's Law. So, in these cases, the lethal concentration may be given simply as LC_{50} and qualified by a duration of exposure (e.g., 10 minutes). The material safety data sheets for toxic substances frequently use this form of the term even if the substance does follow Haber's Law.

== Lowest lethal concentration ==
The LC_{Lo} is the lowest concentration of a chemical, given over a period of time, that results in the fatality of an individual animal. LC_{Lo} is typically for an acute (<24 hour) exposure. It is related to the LC_{50}, the median lethal concentration. The LC_{Lo} is used for gases and aerosolized material.

== Limitations ==
As a measure of toxicity, lethal dose is somewhat unreliable and results may vary greatly between testing facilities due to factors such as the genetic characteristics of the sample population, animal species tested, environmental factors and mode of administration.

There can be wide variability between species as well; what is relatively safe for rats may very well be extremely toxic for humans (cf. paracetamol toxicity), and vice versa. For example, chocolate, comparatively harmless to humans, is known to be toxic to many animals. When used to test venom from venomous creatures, such as snakes, LD_{50} results may be misleading due to the physiological differences between mice, rats, and humans. Many venomous snakes are specialized predators of mice, and their venom may be adapted specifically to incapacitate mice; and mongooses may be exceptionally resistant. While most mammals have a very similar physiology, LD_{50} results may or may not have equal bearing upon every mammal species, including humans.

== Animal rights concerns ==
Animal-rights and animal-welfare groups, such as Animal Rights International, have campaigned against LD_{50} testing on animals in particular as, in the case of some substances, causing the animals to die slow, painful deaths. Several countries, including the UK, have taken steps to ban the oral LD_{50}, and the Organisation for Economic Co-operation and Development (OECD) abolished the requirement for the oral test in 2001.

== See also ==
- Draize test
- EC_{50} (half maximal effective concentration)
- IC_{50} (half maximal inhibitory concentration)
- EID_{50} Egg Infective Dosage
- ELD_{50} Egg Lethal Dosage
- Fixed-dose procedure to estimate LD_{50}
- Immediately dangerous to life or health (IDLH)
- Indicative limit value, also known as indicative occupational exposure limit value (IOELVs)
- Lowest-observed-adverse-effect level (LOAEL), also known as lowest-observed-adverse-effect concentration (LOAEC)
- Lowest published toxic concentration (TCLo)
- Median lethal dose, LD_{50}
- Median toxic dose (TD_{50})
- No-observed-adverse-effect level (NOAEL)
- Plaque forming units (pfu)
- Therapeutic index (This article includes definitions of the following terms. Some of the terms are synonyms. Certain safety factor, effective dose, lethal dose, maximum tolerated dose, optimal biological dose, protective index, safety ratio, safety window, therapeutic range, therapeutic ratio, therapeutic window, and toxic dose.)
- Up-and-down procedure
- Virus quantification (This article includes TCID_{50}, 50% tissue culture infectious dosage.)
