= Protective index =

The protective index (PI) is a comparison of the amount of a therapeutic agent that causes the therapeutic effect to the amount that causes toxicity. Quantitatively, it is the ratio given by the toxic dose divided by the therapeutic dose. A protective index is the toxic dose of a drug for 50% of the population (TD_{50}) divided by the minimum effective dose for 50% of the population (ED_{50}). A high protective index is preferable to a low one: this corresponds to a situation in which one would have to take a much higher dose of a drug to reach the toxic threshold than the dose taken to elicit the therapeutic effect. A drug should ordinarily only be administered if the protective index is greater than one, indicating that the benefit outweighs the risk.

$\text{Protective index} = \frac{TD_{50}}{ED_{50}}$

The protective index is similar to the therapeutic index, but concerns toxicity (TD_{50}) rather than lethality (LD_{50}); thus, the protective index is a smaller ratio. Toxicity can take many forms, as drugs typically have multiple side effects of varying severity, so a specific criterion of toxicity must be specified for the protective index to be meaningful. Ideally a choice is made such that the harm caused by the toxicity just outweighs the benefit of the drug's effect. Thus, the protective index is a more accurate measure of the benefit-to-risk ratio than the therapeutic index, but is less objectively defined. Nevertheless, the therapeutic index can be viewed as an upper bound to the protective index for a given substance.

Protective index can also defined as the factor by which the dose of a toxicant must be multiplied to produce a defined level of toxicity in the presence of a nontoxic dose of another chemical.

$\mbox{Protective index} = \frac{\mathrm{LD}_{50}\text{of A with B}}{\mathrm{LD}_{50}\text{of A alone}}$

The higher the protective index, better is the antidotal value of a given substance. Sometimes the protective index is higher in the presence of two or more substances than in the presence of either of the substances alone. For example, the LD50 of potassium cyanide alone is 11 mg/kg, whereas it is 21 mg/kg in the presence of sodium nitrite, giving a protective index of 1.91. The LD50 of potassium cyanide in the presence of sodium thiosulfate is 35 mg/kg, giving a protective index of 3.2. The LD50 of potassium cyanide in the presence of both nitrite and thiosulfate is 52 mg/kg with a protective index of 4.73. Since the protective index is higher for the simultaneous use of nitrite and thiosulfate, the two chemicals constitute the antidote against cyanide intoxication.
