= ED95 =

May refer to:

- Common ethanol fuel mixtures
- Effective dose (pharmacology)
