= Therapeutic index =

Quantitative measurement of the relative safety of a drug

The therapeutic index (TI; also referred to as therapeutic ratio) is a quantitative measurement of the relative safety of a drug with regard to risk of overdose. It is a comparison of the amount of a therapeutic agent that causes toxicity to the amount that causes the therapeutic effect. The related terms therapeutic window or safety window refer to a range of doses optimized between efficacy and toxicity, achieving the greatest therapeutic benefit without resulting in unacceptable side-effects or toxicity.

Classically, for clinical indications of an approved drug, TI refers to the ratio of the dose of the drug that causes adverse effects at an incidence/severity not compatible with the targeted indication (e.g. toxic dose in 50% of subjects, TD_{50}) to the dose that leads to the desired pharmacological effect (e.g. efficacious dose in 50% of subjects, ED_{50}). In contrast, in a drug development setting TI is calculated based on plasma exposure levels.

In the early days of pharmaceutical toxicology, TI was frequently determined in animals as lethal dose of a drug for 50% of the population (LD_{50}) divided by the minimum effective dose for 50% of the population (ED_{50}). In modern settings, more sophisticated toxicity endpoints are used.

For many drugs, severe toxicities in humans occur at sublethal doses, which limit their maximum dose. A higher safety-based therapeutic index is preferable instead of a lower one; an individual would have to take a much higher dose of a drug to reach the lethal threshold than the dose taken to induce the therapeutic effect of the drug. However, a lower efficacy-based therapeutic index is preferable instead of a higher one; an individual would have to take a higher dose of a drug to reach the toxic threshold than the dose taken to induce the therapeutic effect of the drug.

Generally, a drug or other therapeutic agent with a narrow therapeutic range (i.e. having little difference between toxic and therapeutic doses) may have its dosage adjusted according to measurements of its blood levels in the person taking it. This may be achieved through therapeutic drug monitoring (TDM) protocols. TDM is recommended for use in the treatment of psychiatric disorders with lithium due to its narrow therapeutic range.

Term	Full form	Definition
ED	Effective Dose	the dose or concentration of a drug that produces a biological response.
TD	Toxic Dose	the dose at which toxicity occurs in 50% of cases.
LD	Lethal Dose	the dose at which death occurs in 50% of cases.
TI	Therapeutic Index	a quantitative measurement of the relative safety of a drug by comparison of the amount of a therapeutic agent that causes toxicity to the amount that causes the therapeutic effect

== Types ==
Based on efficacy and safety of drugs, there are two types of therapeutic index:

Safety-based therapeutic index

$TI_\text{safety} = \frac{LD_{50}}{ED_{50}}$
It is desirous for the value of LD_{50} to be as large as possible, to decrease risk of lethal effects and increase the therapeutic window. In the above formula, TI_{safety} increases as the difference between LD_{50} and ED_{50} increases—hence, a higher safety-based therapeutic index indicates a larger therapeutic window, and vice versa.

Efficacy-based therapeutic index

In pharmacology, potency (e.g. ED50) and efficacy (maximal effect, Emax) are distinct properties of drug action. The therapeutic index is typically defined using dose-based measures (such as TD50/ED50) and does not incorporate efficacy directly. The use of terms such as "efficacy-based therapeutic index" is uncommon in standard pharmacology texts and may reflect a conflation of efficacy with dose-based safety margins.

$TI_\text{efficacy} = \frac{ED_{50}}{TD_{50}}$
Ideally the ED_{50} is as low as possible for faster drug response and larger therapeutic window, whereas a drugs TD_{50} is ideally as large as possible to decrease risk of toxic effects. In the above equation, the greater the difference between ED_{50} and TD_{50}, the smaller the value of TI_{efficacy}. Hence, a lower efficacy-based therapeutic index indicates a larger therapeutic window.

Protective index

Similar to safety-based therapeutic index, the protective index uses TD_{50} (median toxic dose) in place of LD_{50}.

$\text{Protective index} = \frac{TD_{50}}{ED_{50}} = \frac{1}{TI_\text{efficacy}}$

For many substances, toxicity can occur at levels far below lethal effects (that cause death), and thus, if toxicity is properly specified, the protective index is often more informative about a substance's relative safety. Nevertheless, the safety-based therapeutic index (${TI_\text{safety}}$) is still useful as it can be considered an upper bound of the protective index, and the former also has the advantages of objectivity and easier comprehension.

Since the protective index (PI) is calculated as TD_{50} divided by ED_{50}, it can be mathematically expressed that:

$$TI_\text{efficacy} = \frac{1}\text{Protective index}$$

which means that $TI_\text{efficacy}$ is a reciprocal of protective index.

All the above types of therapeutic index can be used in both pre-clinical trials and clinical trials.

== Drug development ==
A low efficacy-based therapeutic index ($TI_\text{efficacy}$) and a high safety-based therapeutic index ($TI_\text{safety}$) are preferable for a drug to have a favorable efficacy vs safety profile. At the early discovery/development stage, the clinical TI of a drug candidate is unknown. However, understanding the preliminary TI of a drug candidate is of utmost importance as early as possible since TI is an important indicator of the probability of successful development. Recognizing drug candidates with potentially suboptimal TI at the earliest possible stage helps to initiate mitigation or potentially re-deploy resources.

TI is the quantitative relationship between pharmacological efficacy and toxicological safety of a drug, without considering the nature of pharmacological or toxicological endpoints themselves. However, to convert a calculated TI into something useful, the nature and limitations of pharmacological and/or toxicological endpoints must be considered. Depending on the intended clinical indication, the associated unmet medical need and/or the competitive situation, more or less weight can be given to either the safety or efficacy of a drug candidate in order to create a well balanced indication-specific efficacy vs safety profile.

In general, it is the exposure of a given tissue to drug (i.e. drug concentration over time), rather than dose, that drives the pharmacological and toxicological effects. For example, at the same dose there may be marked inter-individual variability in exposure due to polymorphisms in metabolism, DDIs or differences in body weight or environmental factors. These considerations emphasize the importance of using exposure instead of dose to calculate TI. To account for delays between exposure and toxicity, the TI for toxicities that occur after multiple dose administrations should be calculated using the exposure to drug at steady state rather than after administration of a single dose.

A review published by Muller PY and Milton MN in Nature Reviews Drug Discovery critically discusses TI determination and interpretation in a translational drug development setting for both small molecules and biotherapeutics.

== Range of therapeutic indices ==
The therapeutic index varies widely among substances, even within a related group.

For instance, the opioid painkiller remifentanil is very forgiving, offering a therapeutic index of 33,000:1, while Diazepam, a benzodiazepine sedative-hypnotic and skeletal muscle relaxant, has a less forgiving therapeutic index of 100:1. Morphine is even less so with a therapeutic index of 70:1. Some sources have reported very high therapeutic index values for certain opioids (e.g. remifentanil). However, such values are highly dependent on the experimental endpoint (e.g. LD_{50} vs. respiratory depression), species, and study conditions, and may not reflect clinical safety. In clinical practice, opioids such as morphine, fentanyl, and remifentanil are generally considered to have a narrow therapeutic window due to dose-dependent respiratory depression and the need for careful titration and monitoring.

Less safe are cocaine (a stimulant and local anaesthetic) and ethanol (a sedative): the therapeutic indices for these substances are 15:1 and 10:1, respectively. Paracetamol, alternatively known by its trade names Tylenol or Panadol, also has a therapeutic index of 10:1.

Even less safe are drugs such as digoxin, a cardiac glycoside; its therapeutic index is approximately 2:1.

Other examples of drugs with a narrow therapeutic range, which may require drug monitoring both to achieve therapeutic levels and to minimize toxicity, include dimercaprol, theophylline, warfarin and lithium carbonate.

Some antibiotics and antifungals require monitoring to balance efficacy with minimizing adverse effects, including: gentamicin, vancomycin, amphotericin B (nicknamed 'amphoterrible' for this very reason), and polymyxin B.

=== Cancer radiotherapy ===
Radiotherapy aims to shrink tumors and kill cancer cells using high energy. The energy arises from x-rays, gamma rays, or charged or heavy particles. The therapeutic ratio in radiotherapy for cancer treatment is determined by the maximum radiation dose for killing cancer cells and the minimum radiation dose causing acute or late morbidity in cells of normal tissues. Both of these parameters have sigmoidal dose–response curves. Thus, a favorable outcome in dose–response for tumor tissue is greater than that of normal tissue for the same dose, meaning that the treatment is effective on tumors and does not cause serious morbidity to normal tissue. Conversely, overlapping response for two tissues is highly likely to cause serious morbidity to normal tissue and ineffective treatment of tumors. The mechanism of radiation therapy is categorized as direct or indirect radiation. Both direct and indirect radiation induce DNA mutation or chromosomal rearrangement during its repair process. Direct radiation creates a DNA free radical from radiation energy deposition that damages DNA. Indirect radiation occurs from radiolysis of water, creating a free hydroxyl radical, hydronium and electron. The hydroxyl radical transfers its radical to DNA. Or together with hydronium and electron, a free hydroxyl radical can damage the base region of DNA.

Cancer cells cause an imbalance of signals in the cell cycle. G1 and G2/M arrest were found to be major checkpoints by irradiating human cells. G1 arrest delays the repair mechanism before synthesis of DNA in S phase and mitosis in M phase, suggesting it is a key checkpoint for survival of cells. G2/M arrest occurs when cells need to repair after S phase but before mitotic entry. It is known that S phase is the most resistant to radiation and M phase is the most sensitive to radiation. p53, a tumor suppressor protein that plays a role in G1 and G2/M arrest, enabled the understanding of the cell cycle through radiation. For example, irradiation of myeloid leukemia cells leads to an increase in p53 and a decrease in the level of DNA synthesis. Patients with Ataxia telangiectasia delays have hypersensitivity to radiation due to the delay of accumulation of p53. In this case, cells are able to replicate without repair of their DNA, becoming prone to incidence of cancer. Most cells are in G1 and S phase. Irradiation at G2 phase showed increased radiosensitivity and thus G1 arrest has been a focus for therapeutic treatment. Irradiation of a tissue induces a response in both irradiated and non-irridiated cells. It was found that even cells up to 50–75 cell diameters distant from irradiated cells exhibit a phenotype of enhanced genetic instability such as micronucleation. This suggests an effect on cell-to-cell communication such as paracrine and juxtacrine signaling. Normal cells do not lose their DNA repair mechanism whereas cancer cells often lose it during radiotherapy. However, the high energy radiation can override the ability of damaged normal cells to repair, leading to additional risk of carcinogenesis. This suggests a significant risk associated with radiation therapy. Thus, it is desirable to improve the therapeutic ratio during radiotherapy. Employing IG-IMRT, protons and heavy ions are likely to minimize the dose to normal tissues by altered fractionation. Molecular targeting of the DNA repair pathway can lead to radiosensitization or radioprotection. Examples are direct and indirect inhibitors on DNA double-strand breaks. Direct inhibitors target proteins (PARP family) and kinases (ATM, DNA-PKCs) that are involved in DNA repair. Indirect inhibitors target protein tumor cell signaling proteins such as EGFR and insulin growth factor.

The effective therapeutic index can be affected by targeting, in which the therapeutic agent is concentrated in its desirable area of effect. For example, in radiation therapy for cancerous tumors, shaping the radiation beam precisely to the profile of a tumor in the "beam's eye view" can increase the delivered dose without increasing toxic effects, though such shaping might not change the therapeutic index. Similarly, chemotherapy or radiotherapy with infused or injected agents can be made more efficacious by attaching the agent to an oncophilic substance, as in peptide receptor radionuclide therapy for neuroendocrine tumors and in chemoembolization or radioactive microspheres therapy for liver tumors and metastases. This concentrates the agent in the targeted tissues and lowers its concentration in others, increasing efficacy and lowering toxicity.

== Safety ratio ==
Sometimes the term safety ratio is used, particularly when referring to psychoactive drugs used for non-therapeutic purposes, e.g. recreational use. In such cases, the effective dose is the amount and frequency that produces the desired effect, which can vary, and can be greater or less than the therapeutically effective dose.

The Certain Safety Factor, also referred to as the Margin of Safety (MOS), is the ratio of the lethal dose to 1% of population to the effective dose to 99% of the population (LD_{1}/ED_{99}). This is a better safety index than the LD_{50} for materials that have both desirable and undesirable effects, because it factors in the ends of the spectrum where doses may be necessary to produce a response in one person but can, at the same dose, be lethal in another.

$$\text{Certain safety factor} = \mathrm{\frac{LD_1}{ED_{99}}}$$

== Synergistic effect ==
A therapeutic index does not consider drug interactions or synergistic effects. For example, the risk associated with benzodiazepines increases significantly when taken with alcohol, depressants, opiates, or stimulants when compared with being taken alone. Therapeutic index also does not take into account the ease or difficulty of reaching a toxic or lethal dose. This is more of a consideration for recreational drug users, as the purity can be highly variable.

== Therapeutic window ==
The therapeutic window (or pharmaceutical window) of a drug is the range of drug dosages which can treat disease effectively without having toxic effects. Medication with a small therapeutic window must be administered with care and control, frequently measuring blood concentration of the drug, to avoid harm. Medications with narrow therapeutic windows include theophylline, digoxin, lithium, and warfarin.

== Optimal biological dose ==
Optimal biological dose (OBD) is the quantity of a drug that will most effectively produce the desired effect while remaining in the range of acceptable toxicity.

== Maximum tolerated dose ==
The maximum tolerated dose (MTD) refers to the highest dose of a radiological or pharmacological treatment that will produce the desired effect without unacceptable toxicity. The purpose of administering MTD is to determine whether long-term exposure to a chemical might lead to unacceptable adverse health effects in a population, when the level of exposure is not sufficient to cause premature mortality due to short-term toxic effects. The maximum dose is used, rather than a lower dose, to reduce the number of test subjects (and, among other things, the cost of testing), to detect an effect that might occur only rarely. This type of analysis is also used in establishing chemical residue tolerances in foods. Maximum tolerated dose studies are also done in clinical trials.

MTD is an essential aspect of a drug's profile. All modern healthcare systems dictate a maximum safe dose for each drug, and generally have numerous safeguards (e.g. insurance quantity limits and government-enforced maximum quantity/time-frame limits) to prevent the prescription and dispensing of quantities exceeding the highest dosage which has been demonstrated to be safe for members of the general patient population.

Patients are often unable to tolerate the theoretical MTD of a drug due to the occurrence of side-effects which are not innately a manifestation of toxicity (not considered to severely threaten a patient's health) but cause the patient sufficient distress and/or discomfort to result in non-compliance with treatment. Such examples include emotional "blunting" with antidepressants, pruritus with opiates, and blurred vision with anticholinergics.

== See also ==
- Drug titration – process of finding the correct dose of a drug
- Effective dose
- EC50
- IC50
- LD50
- Hormesis
