= ESB =

ESB may refer to:

== Education ==
- École supérieure du bois, a French engineering College
- Edwards School of Business, at the University of Saskatchewan in Canada
- English Speaking Board, a British educational charity
- ESB Business School, at Reutlingen University in Germany
- European School, Bergen, in the Netherlands

== Sport ==
- E.S.B. (horse), a racehorse
- Elias Sports Bureau, a North American statistical and historical sports information organisation
- Entente Sportive de Bingerville, an Ivorian football club

== Other uses ==
- The E Street Band, an American rock band primarily associated with Bruce Springsteen
- Electric Storage Battery Company, now Exide, an American battery manufacturer
- Empire State Building, a skyscraper in New York City
- The Empire Strikes Back, a 1980 film in the Star Wars series
- Enterprise service bus, a computer software abstraction layer
- Equilibrium partitioning sediment benchmark
- IATA Code ESB, Ankara Esenboğa Airport serving Ankara, Turkey
- ESB Group, a multinational energy group based in Ireland
  - Electric Ireland, formerly ESB Customer Supply, an Irish electricity supplier
- European Union's, abbreviation in Icelandic
- Euskal Sozialista Biltzarrea Basque Socialist Party
- Expeditionary mobile base (ESB), A US Navy hull classification symbol
- Expert Soldier Badge, a badge of the US Army
- Extra special bitter, a style of ale

- Fuller's ESB, an extra special bitter ale
