= EQP =

EQP may refer to:

- Equational prover
- Exact quantum polynomial time
- Equality-constrained quadratic program
- Equilibrium partitioning
- Elders quorum president
- England Qualified Player, individuals such as Ben Meehan who are qualified to play rugby union for England
