= Burniston (surname) =

Burniston is a surname. Notable people with the surname include:

- Christabel Burniston (1909–2006), English educator
- Gordon Burniston (1885–?), English footballer
- John Burniston, Deputy Governor of Bombay
