= ESBS =

ESBS may refer to:

- Earl Shilton Building Society
- École supérieure de biotechnologie Strasbourg
- European Sport Business School

== See also ==
- ESB (disambiguation)
