= Mildred Creak =

English child psychiatrist

- Born: Eleanor Mildred Creak; 1 August 1898; Cheadle Hulme, Stockport, England
- Died: 25 August 1993 (aged 95); Stevenage, Hertfordshire, England
- Education: London School of Medicine for Women; University College Hospital
- Occupation: Child psychiatrist
- Organizations: Maudsley Hospital; Royal Army Medical Corps; Great Ormond Street Hospital
- Awards: Rockefeller Fellowship

Eleanor Mildred Creak (1 August 1898 – 25 August 1993) was an English child psychiatrist known for her work on autism and organic mental disorders. She began her career at Maudsley Hospital and later headed the psychiatric department at Great Ormond Street Hospital.

== Early life ==
Mildred Creak was born on 1 August 1898 in Cheadle Hulme, Stockport, to Robert Brown Creak, a mill engineer, and Ellen (née McCrossan). She attended Withington Girls' School and went on to study medicine at the London School of Medicine for Women, transferring after a year to University College Hospital Medical School and graduating in 1923.

== Career ==
After qualifying, Creak had difficulty securing a medical post because she was a woman. After 90 job applications, she was eventually hired as an assistant physician by The Retreat, a psychiatric hospital in York run by Quakers; she had become a Quaker at university. In 1929, she moved to Maudsley Hospital in London, where she began to expand the service for child and adolescent psychiatry. She was awarded a Rockefeller Fellowship in 1932 which enabled her to visit the Philadelphia Child Guidance Clinic. On her return to London, she specialised through her research and clinical work in children's organic mental disorders: psychiatric problems including tics, chorea, compulsions, hysteria and compulsions caused by biological disease.

Creak worked at Maudsley Hospital until 1939, when it was evacuated to Mill Hill. She stayed at Mill Hill until she joined the Royal Army Medical Corps in 1942. She worked in India in 1943–44, and achieved the rank of major in 1945. After the war, she joined Great Ormond Street Hospital as its first physician in charge of the department of psychological medicine. She was elected Fellow of the Royal College of Physicians soon afterwards in 1949. In the early 1960s, she chaired a working party that established a set of diagnostic criteria for autism, then known as "schizophrenic syndrome of childhood", based partly on 100 patients Creak had treated. At a time when autism was thought to be caused by inadequate parenting, she proposed that it was primarily caused by genetic factors. A unit for autistic children in Perth, Western Australia, was subsequently named after Creak.

== Later life ==
Creak retired in 1963. She developed Alzheimer's disease in the 1970s, and died from breast cancer on 25 August 1993 in Stevenage, Hertfordshire.
