= Alastair Burnet =

British journalist (1928-2012)

Sir Alastair Burnet
- Burnet in the 1970s
- Born: James William Alexander Burnet; 12 July 1928; Fulwood, Sheffield. England
- Died: 20 July 2012 (aged 84); Kensington, London, England
- Other name: Alastair Burnet
- Occupations: Television presenter; newscaster; journalist
- Years active: 1963–1991
- Employer: ITN
- Notable credit: ITV News at Ten
- Spouse: Maureen Sinclair (m. 1958)

Sir James William Alexander Burnet (12 July 1928 – 20 July 2012), known as Alastair Burnet, was a British journalist and broadcaster, who had a career working in news and current affairs programmes, including a long career with Independent Television News (ITN) as chief presenter of the flagship News at Ten; Sir Robin Day described Burnet as "the booster rocket that put ITN into orbit".

He began his career in journalism as a sub-editor and junior leader writer for the Glasgow Herald newspaper from 1951 to 1958. Burnet joined the weekly news and current affairs magazine The Economist in 1958 before becoming ITN's political correspondent in 1963 and working on a number of current affairs programmes such as This Week. Burnet was one of the first newsreaders of the half hour News at Ten bulletin in 1967. He left television broadcasting in 1974 to become editor of the Daily Express newspaper until 1976. Burnet rejoined ITN to read the news on the News at 5:45 bulletin and he returned to present News at Ten two years later. He retired from ITN in 1991.

== Early life ==
Burnet was born on 12 July 1928 in Fulwood, Sheffield to Scottish parents Alexander Burnet (1882–1957) and Jessy (Schonaid), née Rose. His father was an electrical and mechanical engineer, while his mother came from a Scottish Highlands family and she was raised in Easter Ross. One of Burnet's uncles was the Edinburgh divine W. Adam Burnet. He was educated at The Leys School, a boys' Methodist public school in Cambridge, and was the editor of its magazine The Fortnightly. Burnet and the rest of the school were evacuated to Pitlochry in Perth during the Second World War. He later read history at Worcester College, Oxford, and played hockey. Burnet refused to collect his second class degree because he thought he was worthy of a first.

== Career in journalism ==
Upon graduating, Burnet began work as a sub-editor and junior leader writer with future The Guardian editor Alastair Hetherington for the Glasgow Herald newspaper in 1951 after he was employed by the newspaper's editor William Robieson. From 1956 to 1957, he travelled across the United States for a year to study American politics and elections across the political spectrum on a Harkness Fellowship from the Commonwealth Fund of New York. He left the Glasgow Herald in 1958, and was told of a vacancy at the weekly news and current affairs magazine The Economist, joining as a sub-editor, leader writer, and subsequently, associate editor under the editorship of Donald Tyerman.

In 1963, Burnet and his colleagues at The Economist were invited to present a programme on the BBC composed of journalists representing the major weekly magazines. His two reports on the Gorbals and driven grouse shooting impressed Independent Television News (ITN) editor Geoffrey Cox enough to be offered the job of political editor in place of Ian Trethowan. While reporting, Burnet became a relief newscaster and worked on ITN's current affairs programmes including Roving Report, Dateline, Dateline Westminster, What the Papers Say, Fleet Street, Face of Success, and the adult education series on money A Plain Man's Guide to Money. He was also the main anchor for the ITV network's coverage of the 1964, 1966 and 1970 United Kingdom general elections and the Apollo 11 Moon landing in 1969.

Burnet left ITN in 1965 to rejoin The Economist as editor following Tyerman's retirement, but continued broadcasting as a reporter and interviewer for Associated-Rediffusion's weekly current affairs programme This Week that he had presented from 1965 to 1970. He returned part-time to ITN in 1967 to launch the half-hour News at Ten bulletin that provided in depth reporting on the day's events, having campaigned for such a programme. Burnet hosted the first programme (during the show's thirteen-week pilot phase agreed to by executives who favoured a ten-minute bulletin) on 3 July alongside Andrew Gardner, and created the programme's "And finally ..." slot. He also presented the short-lived topical interview series Man in the News in 1970 and 1971. In 1972, he was signed by the BBC to present the current affairs programme Panorama from the middle of that November. Burnet reported and presented for Midweek, and anchored coverage of the February and October 1974 United Kingdom general election programmes, also covering the wedding of Princess Anne and Mark Phillips in November 1973, interviewing the couple shortly before the wedding. Furthermore, he continued to edit The Economist until 1974, where he raised the circulation by 60%.

He then was appointed editor of the Daily Express by Max Aitken, 1st Baron Beaverbrook and Jocelyn Stevens to try and reduce the newspaper's decline in circulation, ending his television career for that period of time. Burnet began working in the role in late October 1974, but resigned at his own request 18 months later in March 1976 to rejoin ITN full-time, with the result being that the only major UK poll in which he was not involved in the UK TV coverage as lead presenter was the 1975 European Community (Common Market) Membership Referendum. His period at the newspaper saw its circulation decline by around 340,000 and lost his editorial independence promised to him over the newspaper and had no team loyal to him to renew it to his liking.

He rejoined ITN in June 1976, initially for a brief stint back on News at Ten, but in September 1976 he became the main presenter for the newly relaunched early evening bulletin News at 5:45. He moved from the News at 5:45 and returned to the restyled News at Ten on 17 April 1978. In 1980, Burnet began presenting a three-hour weekend phone-in news programme on the radio station LBC. In the following year, he became a member of the ITN board, and became an associate editor for overall editorial responsibility for News at Ten in September 1982. He continued to present coverage of political events including the 1979, 1983 and 1987 United Kingdom general elections, by-elections to the House of Commons, Budgets of the United Kingdom, the Democratic National Convention, the first inauguration of Ronald Reagan, the Elections to the European Parliament from 1979 to 1989, and every United States presidential election between 1972 and 1988.

Burnet also presented coverage of the British royal family, commentating on the weddings of Prince Charles and Lady Diana Spencer in 1981, Prince Andrew and Sarah Ferguson in 1986 and other state occasions such as the Pope John Paul II's visit to the United Kingdom. He also wrote four books on the royal family and presented several Royal documentaries including In Person: The Prince and Princess of Wales, A Royal Day and The Royal Family in Scotland. Outside of ITN, he was also a presenter and interviewer for Thames Television's flagship current affairs programme TV Eye (for a time, a substitute for This Week) between January 1983 and 1986.

In February 1990, Burnet resigned from the ITN board amid a dispute over the future ownership of the company following the Broadcasting Act 1990 becoming law, during which his own proposals to restructure the organisation to ensure the organisation was independent from the 15 regional independent franchises whom he feared with removed ITN's assets was rejected. He was offered the job as editor of The Sunday Times by Rupert Murdoch but declined the offer and instead recommended former The Economist colleague Andrew Neil. Burnet took early retirement from ITN as newscaster and associate editor 18 months later, presenting his final edition of News at Ten on 29 August 1991. He had presented 1,447 editions of News at Ten.

He was a member of the Committee of Reading and Other Uses of English Language between 1972 and 1975 and the Monopolies Committee Specialist Panel on Newspaper Panels from 1973 to 1991. Burnet was a director of Times Newspapers between 1982 and 2002 and of United Racecourses Holdings Ltd from 1985 to 1994. He was a member of the Council of the Banking Ombudsman from 1985 to 1996. Burnet was appointed an honorary vice-president of the Chartered Institute of Journalists in 1990.

== Personal life ==
Burnet did not talk about his private life. He married the journalist Maureen Campbell Sinclair at Kincardine Church on 26 July 1958. They had no children. Burnet was a supporter of Scottish football clubs Rangers and Partick Thistle. In June 1976, he received a letter bomb at his home in London but it failed to detonate and was defused by explosive experts.

== Death ==
Following his retirement, he did not make any further appearances on television or write for the press. In part, this was because of his being diagnosed with dementia, following which the requirement for 24-hour nursing resulted in his having to reside in the Beatrice Place Nursing Home in Kensington, London. His condition meant that he felt comfortable only with close friends; these included his wife, and also former ITN News director Diana Edwards-Jones. Burnet died peacefully in the early hours of 20 July 2012, at the Beatrice Place care home in Kensington, where he had been living following a series of strokes. Paying tribute, Andrew Neil referred to Burnet as "Britain's greatest broadcaster". A memorial service for him was held at St Martin-in-the-Fields in Central London on 12 November 2012.

== Popular culture ==
The satirical TV puppet show Spitting Image portrayed Burnet as a fawning royalist, who behaved in an ingratiating manner towards the nearest available member of the royal family; one episode ended with the Burnet puppet singing a song about his love for Queen Elizabeth The Queen Mother (before being pushed aside in favour of Sandy Gall). The satirical magazine Private Eye referred to him as "Arslicker Burnet".

== Honours ==
Burnet was knighted in the 1984 New Year Honours "for services to journalism and broadcasting". He also won numerous awards, including the Richard Dimbleby Award three times from BAFTA in 1966, 1970 and 1979. In 1971, Burnet was named Political Journalist of the Year for 1970 at the Political Writer and Broadcaster of the Year Awards, and received the Royal Television Society (RTS) Judges' Award in 1981. He was inducted into the RTS Hall of Fame in 1999.

The Burnet News Club network for state school news clubs across the United Kingdom was set up by The Economist Educational Foundation in 2013 and named for him.

Media offices
| Preceded by Ian Trethowan | Political Editor of ITN; 1963–1964 | Unknown Next known title holder: Julian Haviland |
| Preceded by Donald Tyerman | Editor of The Economist; 1965–1974 | Succeeded by Andrew Knight |
| Preceded by Ian McColl | Editor of The Daily Express; 1974–1976 | Succeeded by Roy Wright |
