= Geoffrey Crowther, Baron Crowther =

British economist, journalist, educationalist and businessman

The Right Honourable The Lord Crowther
- By Howard Coster, 1937
- Born: Geoffrey Crowther; 13 May 1907; Headingley, Leeds, England
- Died: 5 February 1972 (aged 64); Heathrow Airport, London, England
- Occupations: Journalist, businessman

Geoffrey Crowther, Baron Crowther (13 May 1907 – 5 February 1972) was a British economist, journalist, educationalist and businessman. He was editor of The Economist from 1938 to 1956. His major works include Economics for Democrats (1939) and An Outline of Money (1941).

== Early life and education ==
Crowther was born in Headingley, Leeds, on 13 May 1907, the son of Dr Charles Crowther (1876–1964), professor of agricultural chemistry at the University of Leeds, and his wife, Hilda Louise Reed. He was educated at Leeds Grammar School and Oundle School before gaining a scholarship to Clare College, Cambridge, to read modern languages, in which he took a first in 1928. He then changed to economics and was awarded an upper first class degree in 1929. He was elected president of the Cambridge Union Society in 1928.

Donald Tyerman said of him that "Crowther's self-awareness and self-confidence were not so much asserted as taken for granted. But men who did well enough in life after Cambridge were in despair when they saw how sure it seemed that he would succeed in whatever he chose to do."

In 1929 he was awarded a Commonwealth Fund Fellowship. He spent a year at Yale, where he met his wife Peggy and then, while nominally attached to Columbia University, he spent a year on Wall Street. From 1931 he worked in a London merchant bank and on the recommendation of John Maynard Keynes became an advisor on banking to the Irish Government. He married Peggy in 1932 and after a further recommendation from Keynes joined the staff of The Economist in the same year.

== The Economist ==
He joined The Economist in 1932 and was made deputy editor in 1935. In August 1938, he succeeded Walter Layton to become, at the age of 31, the youngest editor in the newspaper's history.

Under his editorship, The Economist's circulation grew fivefold. It became one of the most influential journals in the world and "made greater progress in every way than in any similar period in its history".

He nurtured the careers of a number of distinguished journalists and writers, including Roland Bird, Donald Tyerman, Barbara Ward, Isaac Deutscher, John Midgley, Norman Macrae, Margaret Cruikshank, Helen Hill Miller, Marjorie Deane, Nancy Balfour, Donald McLachlan, Keith Kyle, Andrew Boyd and George Steiner. He was particularly supportive of the careers of women at a time when this was remarkable in the newspaper world.

He resigned in 1956 after serving seventeen and a half years, just one month longer than Layton. He had become a director of Economist Newspaper Ltd. in 1947 and on his resignation as editor he became managing director. In 1963 he succeeded Layton as chairman.

== Public service ==
During the Second World War he joined the Ministry of Supply and was for a time at the Ministry of Information, before being appointed deputy head of joint war production staff at the Ministry of Production.

In 1956, he was appointed Chairman of the Central Advisory Council for Education (England). The result was The Crowther Report – Fifteen to Eighteen, which eventually led, in 1972, to the raising of the school-leaving age to 16, and in which he coined the word 'numeracy'.

In 1971, he authored the Report of the Committee on Consumer Credit, the "Crowther Report", whose recommendations led to the Consumer Credit Act 1974.

Until his death in 1972, he was chairman of the Royal Commission on the Constitution.

== Other appointments ==
Crowther served for several years on the board of the National Institute of Economic and Social Research and was instrumental in ensuring its survival during the war years.

He served on the Council of the Royal Institute of International Affairs and from 1944 was for a time on the editorial board of International Affairs.

He was editor of Transatlantic, a magazine published in the 1940s by Penguin Books, and was a regular participant on The Brains Trust on BBC radio.

In education, he was a member of the governing body of the London School of Economics, and in 1969 he was appointed Foundation Chancellor of the Open University.

== Business ==
At one point Crowther held as many as 40 directorships. His appointments included vice-chairman of Commercial Union, chairman of The Economist Group, Trust Houses Group, Trafalgar House and Hazell Sun as well as director of London Merchant Securities, Royal Bank of Canada, British Printing Corporation and Encyclopædia Britannica, Inc.

He was involved in ill-fated mergers at British Printing Corporation in 1966 and at Trust House Forte in 1970.

== Family ==
Crowther's parents were Hilda Louise Reed (died 1950) and Charles Crowther (1876–1964), a professor of Agricultural Chemistry at the University of Leeds and then principal of Harper Adams Agricultural College in Shropshire from 1922 to 1944.

He had an elder sister, Phyllis, who married and had two sons. His younger brother, Bernard Martin, followed him to Clare, from where, after obtaining a PhD in Physics and collaborating with Mark Oliphant, he, like Geoffrey, was awarded a Commonwealth Fund scholarship in 1939. The youngest of the three brothers, Donald I. Crowther, obtained a first in natural science at Magdalen College, Oxford and became an associate editor at the BMJ.

== Marriage ==
Crowther met Margaret Worth, who had won a scholarship to Yale Law School from Swarthmore College, in the library at Yale College in 1929. They married on 9 February 1932. They had six children, one of whom, Charles, went on to study economics at Corpus Christi College, Cambridge, and became a journalist at the Financial Times, while another, Anne, was a prominent member of the Greater London Council prior to its dissolution in 1986. Their eldest child, Judith Vail, died in a car crash outside Boulogne-sur-Mer on 11 July 1955, aged 20.

== Death ==
Crowther died of a heart attack at Heathrow Airport on 5 February 1972 at the age of 64.

== Awards and honours ==
Crowther became a Knight Bachelor in 1957, and was awarded a life peerage on 28 June 1968 and became Baron Crowther, of Headingley in the West Riding of the County of York.

He also was awarded seven honorary degrees:

- Honorary Fellow of Clare College, Cambridge, 1958
- Hon LL.D. Nottingham, 1951
- Hon D.Sc (Econ.) London, 1954
- Hon LL.D. Swarthmore, 1957
- Hon LL.D. Dartmouth, 1957
- Hon LL.D. Michigan, 1960
- Hon LL.D. Liverpool, 1961

Coat of arms of Geoffrey Crowther, Baron Crowther

Crest
In front of a demi-stag Or two quill pens in saltire Argent.
Escutcheon
Gules a chevron wavy vairy Or and Azure between in chief two roses Argent barbed and seeded Proper and in base a fleece Or.
Supporters
Dexter an owl, sinister a sandpiper, both Proper and charged on the shoulder with a spur rowel upwards.
Motto
J'y Suis

== Works ==
- An Introduction to The Study of Prices, 2nd Edition with W. Layton, 1935
- Economics for Democrats, 1939
- An Outline of Money, 1940

Media offices
Preceded by Walter Layton	Editor of The Economist; 1938–1956	Succeeded by Donald Tyerman
Academic offices
New institution	Chancellor of the Open University; 1969–1972	Succeeded by The Lord Gardiner
