= Withington Girls' School =

Coordinates: 53.439°N 2.226°W

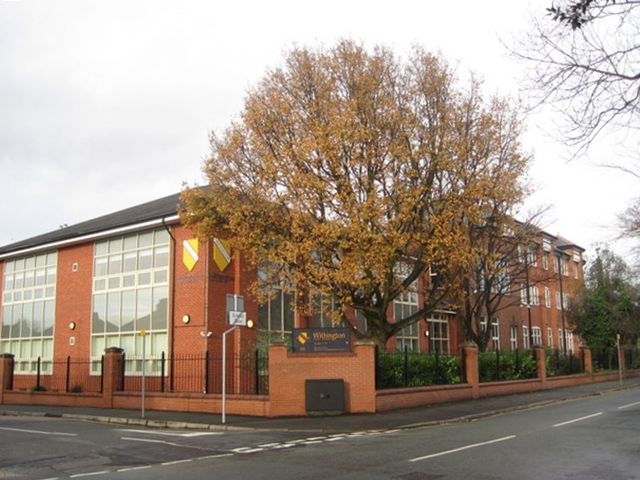

Location
- Wellington Road; Manchester, M14 6BL; England

Information
- Type: Private day school
- Motto: Ad lucem (Latin: "Towards the light")
- Established: 1890
- Local authority: Manchester
- Headmistress: S J Haslam
- Gender: Girls
- Age: 7 to 18
- Enrolment: 727
- Capacity: 790
- Website: http://www.wgs.org/

Withington Girls' School is a private day school in Fallowfield, Manchester, United Kingdom, providing education for girls between the ages of seven and eighteen. Withington is a member of the Girls' Schools Association and the Headmasters' and Headmistresses' Conference.

The school was founded in 1890 by a number of eminent Mancunians. It was named North West Independent School of the Decade by The Sunday Times in 2021. Withington consistently ranks as one of the top schools in the country for academic results.

== History ==
Withington Girls' School was founded in 1890 by a group of eminent Manchester families who wanted the same educational opportunities for their daughters as were already available for their sons. Among the founders were Mrs Louisa Lejeune, the mother of C. A. Lejeune, C. P. Scott, Henry and Emily Simon, Miss Caroline Herford and Sir Adolphus Ward. There were four pupils in the beginning.

== Present day ==
Over the years, the School has aimed to remain true in essence to the founders' principles.

Pupils receive an outstanding education in accordance with the school's aims to help girls achieve an excellent standard of academic achievement, and to foster intellectual curiosity, a love of learning, independence of mind and individual responsibility.

— Independent Schools Inspectorate (2013)

The school suffered a serious arson attack in August 2003, but took this as an opportunity to build new science labs, and has since built a new sixth form common room and additional classrooms.

== Academic curriculum ==
The following subjects are available for all third form (first year/year seven) pupils:

- English and English Literature
- Maths
- Two of French/German/Spanish
- Latin
- Chemistry
- Biology
- Physics
- Physical Education
- ICT
- Food and Nutrition
- History
- Geography
- Religious Studies
- Drama and Theatre Studies
- Art
- Music

As the girls move up the school, other subjects are available, including:

- Greek
- Classical Civilisation
- Computer Science
- Politics (Sixth Form only)
- Economics (Sixth Form only)
- Psychology (Sixth Form only)
- Philosophy (Sixth Form only)

== Extra-curricular activities ==
=== Sport ===
Withington won its first national lacrosse title at the 2022 National Schools competition when its U14 team claimed the top position.

== Notable former pupils ==
- Kate Abdo, television presenter
- Julia Britton, playwright
- Sarah Burton, creative director of the Alexander McQueen brand and designer of Catherine Middleton's wedding dress
- Judith Chalmers, television presenter
- Mildred Creak, child psychiatrist
- Marjorie Deane (1914-2008), financial journalist
- Sarah Foot, medieval historian
- Jen Hadfield, poet (Winner of the T. S. Eliot Prize 2008)
- C. A. Lejeune, film critic
- Brenda Milner, Canadian neuropsychologist
- Joanna Natasegara, 2017 Oscar winner, documentary film-maker
- Christine Rice, opera singer, mezzo-soprano
- Stephen Whittle, Professor of Equalities Law, campaigner for transgender rights
