= English Speaking Board =

British educational charity

English Speaking Board (International) Ltd. (ESB) is a UK-based organisation that delivers teaching and examinations in oral communication and the language arts. It works with schools, businesses, prisons, special needs groups and people for whom English is not a first language.

== History ==
English Speaking Board (International) Ltd. (ESB) was founded in 1953 as a charitable organisation by Christabel Burniston, a pioneer of a new approach to developing speech and listening skills. Breaking away from the traditional ‘elocution’ classes and exams of the era, ESB’s approach was to enable individuals to learn and be tested on their communication skills in a supportive group. The ESB method of assessment placed the candidate – rather than the examiner – as the authority in the examination.

Other professional teaching organisations recognised the merits of this approach and were later to reflect these ideas – notably the 1963 Newsom Report Half Our Future. Education journalist Susan Elkin noted in The Stage's 2006 obituary of Christabel Burniston that the ESB had anticipated the GCSE and National Curriculum approach to speaking and listening by more than 40 years.

In the 1960s, under Burniston’s stewardship, the organisation became known as ESB (International), extending its influence to other English-speaking countries, including Singapore, Kenya, Cyprus and Malta.

== English Speaking Board today ==
English Speaking Board is a national awarding organisation offering qualifications focused on communication skills at school, in college and throughout life. Its qualifications are recognised and mapped to the relevant National Core Curriculum requirements and it works in close partnership with educational centres across the UK, Europe and the Far East. It runs a parallel scheme for non-native speakers. Its qualifications are recognised by Ofqual. and SQA.
