= Donald Tyerman =

Donald Tyerman CBE

Editor of The Economist
- In office 1956–1965

Personal details
- Born: 1 March 1908 Middlesbrough, North Riding of Yorkshire, England
- Died: 4 April 1981 (aged 73)
- Occupation: Journalist

Donald Tyerman CBE (1 March 1908 – 4 April 1981) was an English journalist and editor.

== Early life ==
Tyerman was born in Middlesbrough, England. He contracted polio at the age of three and was paralysed from the neck down, although over the next ten years he did eventually get back full use of the whole of his body except his legs - he needed splints to walk for the rest of his life. He was educated at Great Ayton Friends' School and Gateshead Grammar School and Brasenose College, Oxford and from 1930 to 1936 lectured in history at University College, Southampton.

== Career ==
In 1936 he became a journalist with The Economist and soon became extremely influential, serving as deputy editor from 1939 to 1944. From 1944 to 1956 he was assistant editor of The Times, and then returned to The Economist as editor. He served in this post until 1965.

He was appointed a Commander of the Order of the British Empire (CBE) in 1978.

Media offices
Preceded by ?	Deputy Editor of The Observer; 1943–1944	Succeeded by ?
Preceded by William Francis Casey	Deputy Editor of The Times; 1948–1955	Succeeded by Iverach McDonald
Preceded by Geoffrey Crowther	Editor of The Economist; 1956–1965	Succeeded by Alastair Burnet
