= Toxic unit =

Units used in toxicology

Toxic units (TU) are used in the field of toxicology to quantify the interactions of toxicants in binary mixtures of chemicals. A toxic unit for a given compound is based on the concentration at which there is a 50% effect (ex. EC50) for a certain biological endpoint. One toxic unit is equal to the EC50 for a given endpoint for a specific biological effect over a given amount of time. Toxic units allow for the comparison of the individual toxicities of a binary mixture to the combined toxicity. This allows researchers to categorize mixtures as additive, synergistic or antagonistic. Synergism and antagonism are defined by mixtures that are more or less toxic than predicted by the sum of their toxic units.

Contaminants are frequently present as mixtures in the environment. Regulatory decisions are based on mixture toxicity models that assume additivity, which can result in under or overestimation of toxic effects. Refining our understanding of mixture interactions can lead to better informed environmental management and decision making. In addition, exploring mixture interactions can elucidate the mechanisms of action for specific toxicants which, in many cases, are poorly understood.

== Methods ==
Application of toxic units requires toxicity data for the individual components of the mixture as well as specialized mixture toxicity data. Evaluating the response of each individual chemical allows researchers to generate a new dosing metric, toxic units, which is standardized to the toxicity of each chemical. Since the toxicity of two compounds may vary widely, 1 toxic unit of two different compounds could correspond to two very different concentrations on a per mass basis. In addition to the toxicity of the individual components, use of toxic units requires a 2x2 factorial design concentration series where the response is measured to an increase of each contaminant with the other contaminant held constant. This elaborate concentration series allows researchers to describe how the mixture components interact with each other and predict effects at untested combinations components with nonlinear regression models.

=== Point estimates ===
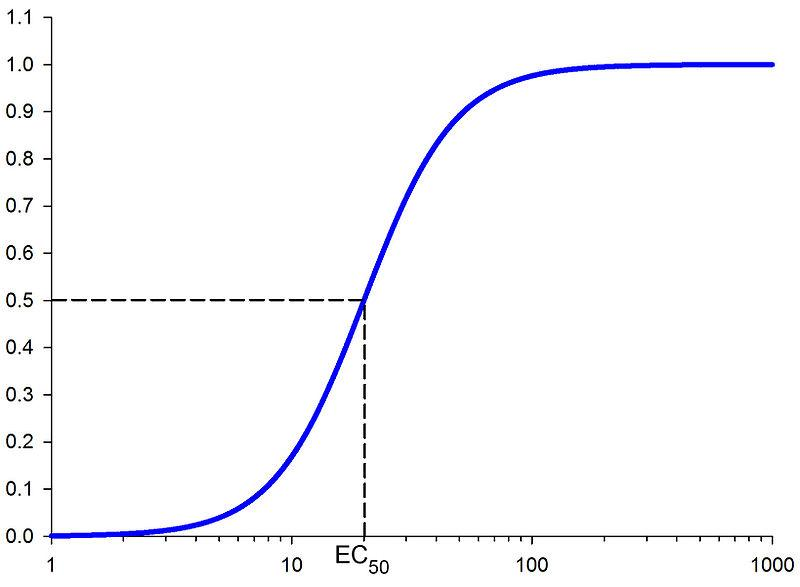
Example of concentration-response model used to calculate EC50. Toxciant concentration is on the X-axis and biological response is on the Y-axis.

Point estimation is a technique to predict population parameters based on available sample data and can be used to relate the mass based concentration to a toxicity based metric. Point estimates in toxicology are frequently response endpoints on a dose response curve. These point estimates predict at what concentration one would expect to see a given biological endpoint like 50% mortality (LC50). Any toxicological endpoint (growth inhibition, reproduction, behavior etc.) can be used as the toxicity metric to convert from mass based concentration to toxic units.

Point estimates are generated by fitting a nonlinear regression model to toxicity data and using that model to predict the concentration of chemical required to elicit a known response of the biological endpoint.

=== Equation and calculations ===
One Toxic unit can be defined by the researcher as the concentration of a given chemical required to cause a given toxicological endpoint (LC50, EC50, IC50).

1TU=LC50 or 1TU=IC50 for inhibition of growth

Since the mass or molar based concentrations of different chemicals required to cause a given endpoint like an LC50 may vary widely, the concentration that corresponds to 1TU is specific to each individual chemical tested.

=== Isobolograms ===
Isobolograms are one way to present the results of binary mixture toxicity testing based in toxic units. The strength of this method is its simplicity and ease of use. First a line of additivity is plotted that corresponds to all the combinations of the two chemicals that would result in one toxic unit. Next the experimental results from binary mixture tests are plotted on the isobologram. The results from the mixture test are point estimates from the mixture dose response curves that correspond to the single chemical tests. When these mixture point estimates are plotted on the isobologram, the region that they fall into (based on the concentrations of the two chemicals required to cause that given endpoint) demonstrates whether the mixture interactions are additive, synergistic or antagonistic.

=== Response surfaces ===
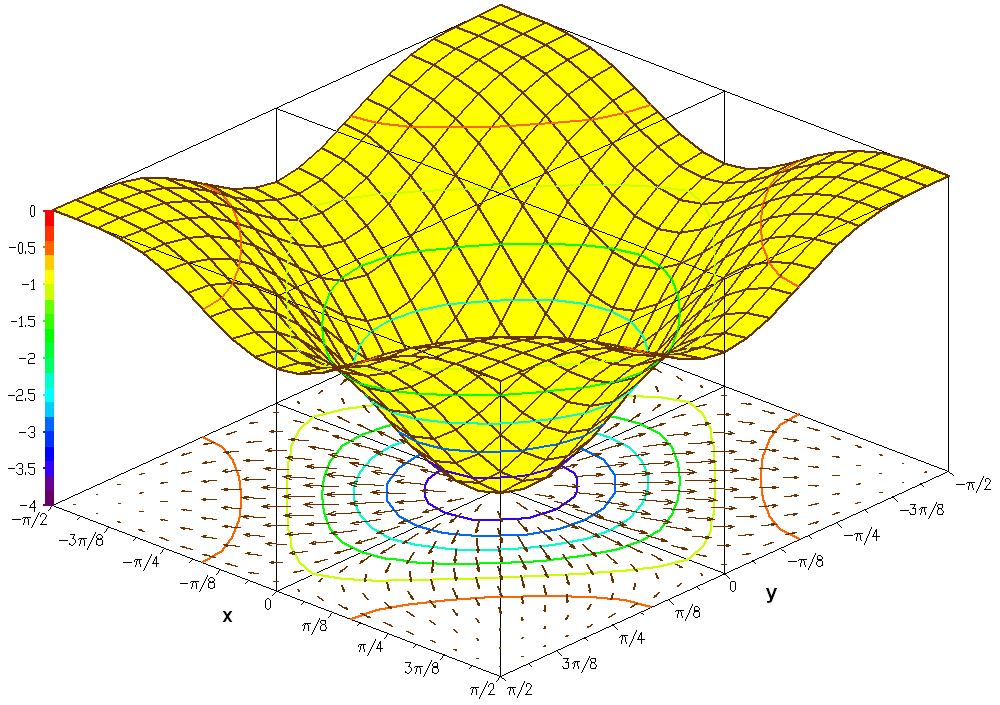
Three dimensional graph depicting the function F(x,y) where x and y could be the concentration of the individual components in toxic units and the height of the graph depicts the toxicological response.

Response surfaces are a more advanced and complex way to visualize the same information presented in an isobologram. A response surface is a three dimensional graph with concentrations of individual components in toxic units on the x and y axis and the response variable on the z axis. This three dimensional representation of the organisms response to the two chemical stressors can be used to predict the toxicity of any combination of the components based on the nonlinear regression models that form the response surface.

=== Antagonistic, additive, and synergistic effects ===
The primary utility of toxic units is to classify mixture interactions as additive, synergistic or antagonistic. Additivity means that the toxicity of the mixture is equal to the sum of the toxicities of the individual components. Additivity is the default assumption of models used to predict toxicity of mixtures for regulatory and environmental management purposes. Synergistic effects occur when the experimental toxicity of the mixture is greater than the sum of the individual toxicities. Conversely, antagonistic effects occur when the experimental toxicity of a mixture is less than would be predicted by additivity. Understanding mixture interactions can prevent over or underestimation of toxicity by regulators who assume additivity for uncategorized mixtures.

== Applications ==
=== Equilibrium partitioning sediment benchmarks ===
The U.S. EPA uses toxic units as a benchmark, called the equilibrium partitioning sediment benchmark (ESB), for predicting the toxicity of polycyclic aromatic hydrocarbon (PAH)-contaminated sediments to benthic invertebrates. Toxic units are calculated from sediment concentrations of 34 PAHs and their expected sediment, water, and lipid partitioning behavior. Based on the equilibrium partitioning approach (which accounts for the varying biological availability of chemicals in different sediments), the ESB for total PAH is the sum of the quotients of a minimum of each of the 34 individual PAHs in a specific sediment, divided by the final chronic value concentration for each specific PAH in sediment. According to the EPA, freshwater or saltwater sediments that contain less or equal to 1.0 toxic units of the mixture of the 34 PAHs or more PAHs are acceptable for the protection of benthic organisms. Sediments that are greater than 1.0 toxic units are not protective and potentially have adverse effects to benthic organisms.

EPA ESBs do not consider antagonistic, additive, or synergistic effects of other sediment contaminants and have been criticized as an overly conservative estimate for pyrogenic PAHs (such as those from manufactured gas plant processes) when only 13 parent PAHs are measured, due to the correction factor used to account for the PAHs not measured. This is in part due to the analytical approaches for determining the toxic units for both pyrogenic and petrogenic PAHs.

=== Toxicity identification evaluation ===
The toxicity identification evaluation (TIE) is an approach to systematically characterize, identify, and confirm toxic substances in whole sediments and sediment interstitial waters. This approach is typically carried out by the EPA. The effluent effect concentration data and the measured toxicant concentration data are transformed to toxic units for the regression analysis to evaluate whether a linear relationship exists between two or more toxicants.

== Limitations ==
The limitations associated with using toxic units are largely dependent on the methodology in which they are being used. For example, the use of isobolograms is applicable to only binary mixtures. In general, toxic units are based on point estimates which are limited by projection. Point estimates, and therefore toxic units, are a simplification of a dose-response model. Information about toxic effects at concentrations other than the point estimate are lost in translation.

=== Alternative ways to study mixtures ===
==== Top-down Approach ====
A common method for studying mixtures is to measure the total toxicity of the mixture and consider the internal toxicant interactions as irrelevant. Any mixture effects are taken into account in the total toxicity. The results for this method are limited by being mixture specific and has limited value in determining specific mechanisms of toxicity.

==== GLM Approach ====
Using Generalized Linear Models (GLM) allows for complex, non-parametric model fitting to describe the toxicity complex mixtures. Generalized Linear Models are more likely to find significant differences from additivity than TU approaches. The GLM approach also allows for the alteration of models to reflect current knowledge of biological mechanisms
