= Fixed-dose procedure =

Method for assessing acute oral toxicity

The fixed-dose procedure (FDP), proposed in 1992 by the British Toxicology Society, is a method to assess a substance's acute oral toxicity.

In comparison to the older LD_{50} test developed in 1927, this procedure produces similar results while using fewer animals and causing less pain and suffering. As a result, in 1992 this test was proposed as an alternative to the LD50 test by the Organisation for Economic Co-operation and Development under OECD Test Guideline 420. However, the U.S. Food and Drug Administration has begun to approve non-animal alternatives in response to research cruelty concerns and the lack of validity/sensitivity of animal tests as they relate to humans.

== See also ==
- Up-and-down procedure
