= Simultaneously extracted metals and acid-volatile sulfide =

Simultaneously extracted metals/Acid-volatile sulfide (SEM-AVS) is an approach used in the field of aquatic toxicology to assess the potential for metal ions found in sediment to cause toxic effects in organisms dwelling in the sediment. In this approach, the amounts of several heavy metals in a sediment sample are measured in a laboratory; at the same time, the amount of acid-volatile sulfide (sulfide which can be liberated from the sediment by treatment with hydrochloric acid) is determined. Based on the chemical interactions between heavy metals (SEM) and acid-volatile sulfide (AVS), the concentrations of these two components can be used to assess the potential for toxicity to sediment-dwelling organisms.

== Background ==
=== Metals ===
A number of heavy metals, such as cadmium and lead, are toxic to various forms of life, particularly when dissolved in water as metal ions. Toxic heavy metals are often present in surface water as a result of natural processes, such as the weathering of metal-containing rocks, or due to human activity, such as mining and smelting. Only the ionic forms of most metals are soluble in water. These ionic forms have a high chemical affinity for the surfaces of most sediment particles, meaning they bind tightly to their surface. As a result, when water bearing heavy metal ions is in contact with sediment, the ions tend to accumulate in the sediment at elevated concentrations. This is an example of partition equilibrium. If metal ions are present in great enough quantities, they may have toxic effects on organisms that are exposed to them by ingestion or absorption.

=== Sulfide ===
The sulfide ion (S^{2−}) is present in some anoxic sediments as a result of bacterial activity. In environments containing little or no oxygen gas (O_{2}) but large amounts of sulfate ion (SO_{4}^{2−}), sulfate-reducing bacteria use sulfate in their metabolism as an electron acceptor. This process creates sulfide as a product according to Equation 1.

$SO_4^{2-} (aq) + CH_3COOH (aq) \rightarrow S^{2-} (aq) + 2HCO_3^- (aq)+ 2 H^+ (aq)$	1

The sulfide ion produced by this process is sensitive to biological or chemical oxidation in the presence of oxygen, so it only persists in sediments that are continuously anoxic.

=== Metal-Sulfide Interactions ===
When dissolved in water, sulfide has a high affinity for numerous heavy metal ions. That is, the solubility-product constants (K_{sp}) for the sulfides of these metals are very small, meaning they will precipitate as solids when a heavy metal ion and sulfide ion come into contact, as in Equation 2, where M^{2+} is a generic metal in the +2 oxidation state.

$M^{2+} (aq) + S^{2-} (aq) \rightarrow MS (s)$	2

In anoxic sediments uncontaminated by heavy metals, the associated metal (M in equation 2) is usually iron (Fe) or manganese (Mn). Iron (II) is abundant in anoxic sediment, and the K_{sp} for iron (II) sulfide is 10^{−22.39} (with a comparable value for manganese (II) sulfide), so effectively all the sulfide in an uncontaminated sediment will be bound to Fe or Mn.

Several toxic heavy metals, however, have K_{sp} values substantially lower than those of the sulfides of iron and manganese - for example, cadmium (II) sulfide (CdS) has a K_{sp} equal to 10^{−32.85}. This means cadmium binds sulfide with a much higher affinity than does iron. When water contaminated with cadmium ions comes into contact with sediment containing FeS, the cadmium displaces the iron according to Equation 3 and becomes tightly bound to the sulfide ion.

$Cd^{2+} (aq) + FeS(s) \rightarrow CdS (s) + Fe^{2+} (aq)$	3

Due to the large difference in K_{sp} values for the two metal sulfides, this reaction proceeds effectively to completion, meaning that until all the sulfide in a sediment is used up, all the cadmium in that sediment will be present in the solid CdS form. A number of other toxic heavy metals behave similarly, including lead, copper, zinc, mercury, and nickel.

Metal	log K_{MS}	log K_{MS}/K_{FeS}
Nickel	-27.98	-5.59
Zinc	-28.39	-6.00
Cadmium	-32.85	-10.46
Lead	-33.42	-11.03
Copper	-40.94	-18.55
Mercury	-57.25	-34.86

=== Bioavailability ===
In order for toxic substances like heavy metals to cause effects in organisms, they must be bioavailable. For organisms residing in contaminated sediments, the contaminants are most bioavailable when dissolved in the pore water, as opposed to being precipitated as a solid or sorbed to a sediment particle. Metals in the solid metal-sulfide form are thus considered non-bioavailable, and are unlikely to cause toxicity in sediment-dwelling organisms.

Thus, sediments with the same quantity of metals in them may have vastly different toxic effects, depending on the quantity of sulfide available to bind with them and render them non-bioavailable. For this reason, the SEM-AVS approach was developed to account for differences in sulfide and refine methods for predicting heavy metal toxicity in sediments.

== Methods ==
=== Sample Collection ===
Because sulfide is quickly degraded in the presence of oxygen, sediment samples for SEM/AVS analysis must be kept under rigorously anoxic conditions from the moment they are sampled. In addition, samples should be kept at 4 °C to keep bacterial metabolism from altering sediment composition. The State of Ohio Environmental Protection Agency recommends storing samples for no longer than 14 days before analyzing them.

=== Extraction ===
Sediment samples to be analyzed are first purged with argon or nitrogen gas to ensure they are anoxic. The sample is placed in a flask connected to an apparatus for trapping hydrogen sulfide gas (H_{2}S). Oxygen-free water and hydrochloric acid (HCl) are added, and the sediment is stirred for one hour while argon or nitrogen gas is bubbled through.

=== Sulfide Determination ===
When HCl is mixed with metal sulfides in the sediment, a reaction occurs that generates H_{2}S and liberates the metal ion into aqueous form, as shown in Equation 4. The gas formed by this process accumulates in the trap connected to the flask. By weighing the trap before and after the extraction process, the amount of H_{2}S produced by the reaction can be calculated.

$MS(s) + 2HCl (aq) \rightarrow H_2S (g) + M^{2+} (aq) + 2Cl^- (aq)$	4

A few important things should be noted about this reaction:

- Not all of the sulfide present in a sediment sample will undergo this reaction when exposed to HCl. Some may be buried deep inside sediment grains and be unavailable to react. Thus, the method is a measurement of the "acid-volatile sulfide," rather than the total sulfide.
- The stoichiometric ratio of MS to H_{2}S is 1:1, meaning for every sulfide ion present as a metal sulfide compound, one molecule of H_{2}S is generated. Thus, the amount (in moles) of H_{2}S measured by weighing the trap is equal to the amount of AVS originally present in the sediment.
- The metal (M) is transformed from solid form to the dissolved form. In uncontaminated sediment, M will mostly be a combination of Fe and Mn. In contaminated sediments, toxic heavy metals such as Cd, Pb, etc. will also be liberated by the reaction.

Once the quantity (in moles) of AVS has been determined in this way, it is divided by the dry mass of the sediment to obtain the AVS concentration. In addition to the gravimetric method described here, other methods, such as colorimetry, may be used.

=== Metals Determination ===
As noted above, treating metals-containing sediments with HCl liberates metal ions into the acid solution that were previously bound up with AVS. After treatment these are present in solution, along with any metals that were initially unbound to AVS (due to insufficient AVS in the sediment to "mop up" all the metal ions). The concentrations of metals in the acid solution can be measured by a number of analytical chemistry methods, including atomic emission spectrometry, atomic absorption spectrometry (AAS), or mass spectrometry. These are known as "simultaneously extracted metals" because they are the metals liberated from the sediment while the volatilization of sulfide is occurring. Metals extracted from sediment by digestion, or with a different acid than HCl are not simultaneously extracted metals. By correcting appropriately for dilution, the SEM concentration in the sediment can be determined.

In initial versions of the SEM-AVS approach, six metals were measured: nickel, zinc, cadmium, copper, lead, and mercury. More current methods call for the measurement of silver in addition to these metals.

== Toxicity ==
=== Theory ===
In applying the SEM-AVS approach, two concentrations are determined: the total concentrations of all toxic heavy metals of interest, represented as [SEM], and the acid-volatile sulfide concentration, represented as [AVS]. From these concentrations, the [SEM]/[AVS] ratio can be obtained, summarizing the results in a single value.

Based on the extremely low K_{sp} values for heavy metal sulfides, if [SEM]/[AVS] is less than 1 ([SEM < [AVS]), then all the extractable metals in the sediment should be in their solid sulfide form and non-bioavailable; above this value, the pool of sulfide is "exhausted" and heavy metals are more likely to be present in the sediment pore water, their bioavailable form. In theory, then, an [SEM]/[AVS] value of 1 represents a cutoff between a "no-effects" range and a "possible effects" range.

=== Spiked-Sediment Studies ===
A 1996 study of the predictive power of the [SEM]/[AVS] approach employed laboratory toxicity testing of spiked sediments. Toxic heavy metals, alone and in combination, were added to clean sediments with varying concentrations of AVS. Benthic organisms were then exposed to the sediments, and their mortality was measured and compared to metal-free controls. Ninety-two different trials were conducted, using several test species exposed to cadmium, copper, nickel, lead, and zinc.

In sediments where [SEM]/[AVS] was less than or equal to 1, only 1.1% of trials showed greater toxicity than in controls. Where the ratio was greater than 1, 73.5% of trials showed greater toxicity than controls. These results held for both fresh and salt water, for different metal types and test species, and across a range of SEM and AVS concentrations. A study that deployed spiked sediments in a pond found a similar threshold at [SEM]/[AVS] = 1 for effects to local benthic fauna. Spike studies that measured heavy metals concentrations in the pore water - that is, before extracting with HCl - found that, when [AVS] was greater than [SEM], pore water heavy metal concentrations were undetectable or nearly so. These results strongly support the basic theoretical framework of the SEM-AVS approach.

=== Field Studies ===
The results of applying the SEM-AVS approach to contaminated sites in the field were mixed. One study found that [SEM]/[AVS] was a good predictor of toxic effects in laboratory exposures to field-contaminated sites. However, a re-analysis by other investigators suggested that [SEM]/[AVS] was neither a more sensitive predictor of toxic effects nor a more efficient one than simply measuring metals concentration per sediment dry weight. In addition, in Flemish rivers polluted with metals, AVS concentration had little to no effect on the accumulation of metals in benthic organisms (though no measurements of toxicity were done).

== Sediment Quality Assessment ==
The potential for SEM-AVS to act as a screening tool in evaluating sediment toxicity due to metals has led several regulatory bodies to use it in the establishment of regulatory assessments of sediment quality.

=== European Union ===
Under the Water Framework Directive, implemented by the European Union in 2003, Environmental Quality Standards (EQS) for metals-contaminated sediments incorporate [SEM]/[AVS] measurements.

=== Australia ===
In sediment quality assessments in Australia, SEM-AVS is employed in second-tier assessment. That is, when initial screening indicates metals concentrations in excess of guidelines, [SEM]/[AVS] is calculated to determine if sufficient sulfide is present to mitigate metal bioavailability.

=== United States ===
In a 2002 guidance manual for assessment of contaminated freshwater sediment, the US Environmental Protection Agency (EPA) listed [SEM] - [AVS] (a variant of the approach in which data are normalized by subtraction rather than division) as a "Moderate Priority" metric of ecosystem health. Since 2005, EPA Equilibrium Partitioning Sediment Benchmarks (ESBs) for metal mixtures have been derived from a combination of Water Quality Criteria (WQC) and a variant of [SEM]/[AVS] corrected for the organic carbon content of the sediment. In conducting its National Sediment Quality Survey, the EPA used [SEM] - [AVS] in its classification scheme; a sediment with an [SEM] - [AVS] concentration greater than 5 μg/g dry weight was classified as "Tier 1: Associated Adverse Effects on Aquatic Life or Human Health Are Probable." Values between 0 and 5 μg/g dry weight were classified as "Tier 2: Associated Adverse Effects on Aquatic Life or Human Health Are Possible." The Ohio Environmental Protection Agency uses [SEM]/[AVS] in sediment quality guidelines for waters in that state.
