= Christabel Burniston =

- Born: Sarah Elizabeth Christabel Hyde; 12 September 1909; Leeds
- Died: 27 October 2006 (aged 97)
- Occupations: Teacher and adjudicator of speech and drama; English Speaking Board founder
- Notable credit(s): MBE for services to education (1978); fellowships of College of Preceptors and Society of Teachers of Speech and Drama

Christabel Burniston MBE (12 September 1909 – 27 October 2006) founded the English Speaking Board (ESB). She was a pioneer in oral communication and the language arts, who championed the importance of spoken English as a vital life skill, describing it as enabling: "effective relationships with others, and insight into human relationships".

== Early life ==
Born in Leeds, Sarah Elizabeth Christabel Hyde (the Christabel she later used as her first name was in honour of Christabel Pankhurst) was the youngest of four sisters. Her father, an insurance worker, came from an East Riding farming background. Her mother was a suffragette, anti-vivisectionist, a member of the Theosophical Society and a socialist. Burniston inherited both her mother's liberal ideals and breadth of vision about the value of education and enjoyed a carefree but disciplined upbringing, later described in her autobiography Life in a Liberty Bodice.

Burniston was educated at Chapel Allerton school and Leeds Institute of Education, where she gained a first-class Froebel teaching certificate and a speech and drama qualification. After qualifying, she taught at Cheadle Hulme School in Cheshire for five years. After the war, she became County Drama Organiser for Lancashire, a role that saw her travelling around the north-west adjudicating at drama festivals and holding drama seminars, workshops and summer schools. During this time she also became a founder member of the Guild of Drama Adjudicators (GoDA). In 1950, after the collapse of her wartime marriage to Stanley Burniston, she moved to Southport with her young daughter Elizabeth and started the North-West School of Speech and Drama.

== The English Speaking Board ==
Burniston established the English Speaking Board (ESB) in 1953. Pioneering a new approach to oral skills examination, she recognised that developing speech and listening skills for life had not been seriously considered as an essential element of education. Her vision was for individuals to develop and be tested on these skills in a supportive group, an approach that was very different from the formal 'elocution' exams of that era.

Burniston saw the candidate – rather than the examiner – as the authority in the examination. Other professional organisations recognised the merits of this approach and were later to reflect ESB's ideas – notably the 1963 Newsom Report Half Our Future. Under her stewardship, the English Speaking Board became ESB (International) in the 1960s, extending its influence as Burniston took the board's philosophy to New Zealand, Australia, South Africa, Malta and Canada. In 1978, she received an MBE for services to education.

Burniston assumed a new role as ESB President in 1981. In 1996, she was awarded a fellowship of the College of Preceptors and later was among the first to gain a Society of Teachers of Speech and Drama (STSD) fellowship.

== Other activities ==
Burniston was a council member of the STSD from 1947 to 1991. She adjudicated for the British Federation of Festivals (formerly British Federation of Music Dance and Drama). She was external examiner in spoken English at the Education Institute of the Universities of Aberdeen, Cambridge, Durham, Leicester, Newcastle and Nottingham. She also undertook lecturing, examining and adjudicating tours to Hong Kong, Egypt, New Zealand, Australia and South Africa. She was a founding member of the Women of the Year Association.

== Later life ==
Burniston moved to Cheltenham in 1998 to write and see more of her family, continuing to promote the work of ESB with the help of Jocelyn Bell, her professional colleague and companion. She joined the Society of Women Writers and Journalists, later becoming a vice-president. Already a noted author of books about developing communication skills, she published her first novel, The Brass and the Velvet, at the age of 90. When Christabel Burniston was interviewed on Woman’s Hour in 2001, presenter Jenni Murray said: “I’ve always wanted to thank you for everything you’ve done for me. Without you I probably wouldn’t be doing this job today”.

In 2006, she was among the high-profile signatories to a letter in a national newspaper calling for a national debate about how best to meet children's emotional and social needs in the 21st century.

=== Legacy ===
Today ESB promotes and assesses spoken English in schools, colleges, the business world, special needs environments, prisons and, increasingly, among those who do not speak English as a first language. ESB retains The Christabel Burniston Fund, a grant to provide financial support to candidates who might not otherwise be able to access its exams.

== Published works ==
- Choral Speech for schools, colleges and festivals, Burniston, Christabel and Oliver Coligny de Champleur Ellis, (Poetry Lovers' Fellowship, 1952)
- What is spoken English? Can it be examined in general education? (English Speaking Board, 1963)
- Spoken English in Further Education (Methuen, 1966)
- Speech for Life (Oxford, 1966)
- Speech for Life (Pergamon, 1967) ISBN 0 08 018319 0
- Creative Oral Assessment; its scope and stimulus (Pergamon, 1968)
- Into the life of things; An exploration of language through verbal dynamics, Bell, Jocelyn and Burniston, Christabel, (Lowes, 1972)
- Spoken English in Advanced Education (English Speaking Board (International), 1974)
- The Case for Community Service and the Young Adult (The Board, 1976) ISBN 0950278939, 9780950278933
- Creative Oral Assessment: A Handbook for teachers and examiners of Oral Skills (T.Snape & Co, 1982) ISBN 0 907214 03 7
- Life in a Liberty Bodice (Highgate Publications, 1991) ISBN 0 948929 44 8
- The Brass and the Velvet (Book Guild Limited, 2002) ISBN 1857767721 / 1-85776-772-1
