= Marjorie Deane =

British financial journalist and author

- Born: 1914; Manchester
- Died: 2 October 2008 (aged 93–94)
- Education: Withington Girls' School; London University
- Occupations: journalist and author
- Employer: The Economist
- Known for: "a pathbreaker for female financial journalists"

Marjorie Deane MBE (1914 – 2 October 2008) was a British financial journalist and author, who worked for The Economist from 1947 to 1989, and has been called "a pathbreaker for female financial journalists" by Paul Volcker, the former chairman of the US Federal Reserve.

== Early life ==
Marjorie Deane was born in 1914 in Manchester. She was educated there at Withington Girls' School, followed by a degree in mathematics at London University.

== Career ==
During the Second World war, Deane worked as a statistician for the Admiralty, where she reported to the poet John Betjeman, who would become a friend.

Deane worked for The Economist from 1947 to 1989, and in the magazine's obituary of Deane, she was described as "the backbone of The Economist's financial coverage". She was initially hired as a statistician, and although The Economist were relatively enlightened employers, this did not extend to equal pay in her earlier years; according to the editor Geoffrey Crowther, "You can hire a first-rate woman for the price of a second-rate man".

Deane retired from The Economist aged 75, but continued working on a consultancy basis for various employers, and published a book aged 80 with the journalist Robert Pringle, entitled, The Central Banks.

Paul Volcker, the former chairman of the US Federal Reserve, has called Deane "a pathbreaker for female financial journalists".

== Honours ==
In 2006, Deane was awarded an MBE, and said to the Queen: "I gather you don't much like us journalists, Ma’am", to which the Queen replied that financial journalists were all right.

== Personal life ==
She died on 2 October 2008, at the age of 94.

== Legacy ==
In 1998, she put £1 million towards establishing up a foundation to encourage young financial journalists, and most of her estate was added to The Marjorie Deane Financial Journalism Foundation.

== Selected publications ==
- Economic ties in the free world. Friends of Atlantic Union, 1953.
- Stagflation, Britain's way out. The Economist Newspaper Ltd, 1971. ISBN 0850580110.
- The Central Banks (with Robert Pringle). Hamish Hamilton, 1994. ISBN 0241133262
