= Anderson Report (British Education) =

1960 report on UK education finance

The Anderson Report was a British report on Higher Education published on 2 June 1960 which called for higher student grants. Its official title was Grants for Students. The unofficial title is taken from the name of Sir Colin Anderson, who chaired the committee.

The report was greeted by students with protests in favour of the report's recommendations. At Bristol University there were marches and an 11-day sit in favour of the report at the Universities Senate House.
