= Median lethal dose =

Measurement of lethal dose of substance

In toxicology, the median lethal dose, LD_{50} (abbreviation for "lethal dose, 50%"), LC_{50} (lethal concentration, 50%) or LCt_{50} is a toxic unit that measures the lethal dose of a given substance. The value of LD_{50} for a substance is the dose required to kill half the members of a tested population after a specified test duration. LD_{50} figures are frequently used as a general indicator of a substance's acute toxicity. A lower LD_{50} is indicative of higher toxicity.

The term LD_{50} is generally attributed to John William Trevan. The test was created by J. W. Trevan in 1927. The term semilethal dose is occasionally used in the same sense, in particular with translations of foreign language text, but can also refer to a sublethal dose. LD_{50} is usually determined by tests on animals such as laboratory mice. In 2011, the U.S. Food and Drug Administration approved alternative methods to LD_{50} for testing the cosmetic drug botox without animal tests.

== Conventions ==
The LD_{50} is usually expressed as the mass of substance administered per unit mass of test subject, typically as milligrams of substance per kilogram of body mass, sometimes also stated as nanograms (suitable for botulinum toxin), micrograms, or grams (suitable for paracetamol) per kilogram. Stating it this way allows the relative toxicity of different substances to be compared and normalizes for the variation in the size of the animals exposed (although toxicity does not always scale simply with body mass). For substances in the environment, such as poisonous vapors or substances in water that are toxic to fish, the concentration in the environment (per cubic metre or per litre) is used, giving a value of LC_{50}. But in this case, the exposure time is important (see below).

The choice of 50% lethality as a benchmark avoids the potential for ambiguity of making measurements in the extremes and reduces the amount of testing required. However, this also means that LD_{50} is not the lethal dose for all subjects; some may be killed by much less, while others survive doses far higher than the LD_{50}. Measures such as "LD_{1}" and "LD_{99}" (dosage required to kill 1% or 99%, respectively, of the test population) are occasionally used for specific purposes.

Lethal dosage often varies depending on the method of administration; for instance, many substances are less toxic when administered orally than when intravenously administered. For this reason, LD_{50} figures are often qualified with the mode of administration, e.g., "LD_{50} i.v."

The related quantities LD_{50}/30 or LD_{50}/60 are used to refer to a dose that without treatment will be lethal to 50% of the population within (respectively) 30 or 60 days. These measures are used more commonly within radiation health physics, for ionizing radiation, as survival beyond 60 days usually results in recovery.

A comparable measurement is LCt_{50}, which relates to lethal dosage from exposure, where C is concentration and t is time. It is often expressed in terms of mg-min/m^{3}. ICt_{50} is the dose that will cause incapacitation rather than death. These measures are commonly used to indicate the comparative efficacy of chemical warfare agents, and dosages are typically qualified by rates of breathing (e.g., resting = 10 L/min) for inhalation, or degree of clothing for skin penetration. The concept of Ct was first proposed by Fritz Haber and is sometimes referred to as Haber's law, which assumes that exposure to 1 minute of 100 mg/m^{3} is equivalent to 10 minutes of 10 mg/m^{3} (1 × 100 = 100, as does 10 × 10 = 100).

Some chemicals, such as hydrogen cyanide, are rapidly detoxified by the human body, and do not follow Haber's law. In these cases, the lethal concentration may be given simply as LC_{50} and qualified by a duration of exposure (e.g., 10 minutes). The material safety data sheets for toxic substances frequently use this form of the term even if the substance does follow Haber's law.

For disease-causing organisms, there is also a measure known as the median infective dose and dosage. The median infective dose (ID_{50}) is the number of organisms received by a person or test animal qualified by the route of administration (e.g., 1,200 org/man per oral). Because of the difficulties in counting actual organisms in a dose, infective doses may be expressed in terms of biological assay, such as the number of LD_{50}s to some test animal. In biological warfare infective dosage is the number of infective doses per cubic metre of air times the number of minutes of exposure (e.g., ICt_{50} is 100 medium doses - min/m^{3}).

== Limitation ==
As a measure of toxicity, LD_{50} is somewhat unreliable and results may vary greatly between testing facilities due to factors such as the genetic characteristics of the sample population, animal species tested, environmental factors and mode of administration.

There can be wide variability between species as well; what is relatively safe for rats may very well be extremely toxic for humans (cf. paracetamol toxicity), and vice versa. For example, chocolate, comparatively harmless to humans, is known to be toxic to many animals. When used to test venom from venomous creatures, such as snakes, LD_{50} results may be misleading due to the physiological differences between mice, rats, and humans. Many venomous snakes are specialized predators on mice, and their venom may be adapted specifically to incapacitate mice; and mongooses may be exceptionally resistant. While most mammals have a very similar physiology, LD_{50} results may or may not have equal bearing upon every mammal species, such as humans, etc.

== Examples ==
Note: Comparing substances (especially drugs) to each other by LD_{50} can be misleading in many cases due (in part) to differences in effective dose (ED_{50}). Therefore, it is more useful to compare such substances by therapeutic index, which is simply the ratio of LD_{50} to ED_{50}.

The following examples are listed in reference to LD_{50} values, in descending order, and accompanied by LC_{50} values, {bracketed}, when appropriate.

Substance	Animal, route	LD_{50} {LC_{50}}	LD_{50} : g/kg {LC_{50} : g/L} standardised	Reference
Water (H_{2}O)	rat, oral	>90,000 mg/kg	>90	
Sucrose (table sugar)	rat, oral	29,700 mg/kg	29.7	
Corn syrup	rat, oral	25,800 mg/kg	25.8	
Glucose (blood sugar)	rat, oral	25,800 mg/kg	25.8	
Monosodium glutamate (MSG)	rat, oral	16,600 mg/kg	16.6	
Stevioside (from stevia)	mice and rats, oral	15,000 mg/kg	15	
Gasoline (petrol)	rat	14,063 mg/kg	14.0	
Vitamin C (ascorbic acid)	rat, oral	11,900 mg/kg	11.9	
Glyphosate (isopropylamine salt)	rat, oral	10,537 mg/kg	10.537	
Lactose (milk sugar)	rat, oral	10,000 mg/kg	10	
Aspartame	mice, oral	10,000 mg/kg	10	
Urea (OC(NH_{2})_{2})	rat, oral	8,471 mg/kg	8.471	
Cyanuric acid	rat, oral	7,700 mg/kg	7.7	
Cadmium sulfide (CdS)	rat, oral	7,080 mg/kg	7.08	
Ethanol (CH_{3}CH_{2}OH)	rat, oral	7,060 mg/kg	7.06	
Sodium isopropyl methylphosphonic acid (IMPA, metabolite of sarin)	rat, oral	6,860 mg/kg	6.86	
Melamine	rat, oral	6,000 mg/kg	6	
Taurine	rat, oral	5,000 mg/kg	5	
Melamine cyanurate	rat, oral	4,100 mg/kg	4.1	
Fructose (fruit sugar)	rat, oral	4,000 mg/kg	4	
Sodium molybdate (Na_{2}MoO_{4})	rat, oral	4,000 mg/kg	4	
Sodium chloride (table salt)	rat, oral	3,000 mg/kg	3	
Paracetamol (acetaminophen)	rat, oral	2000 mg/kg	2	
Delta-9-tetrahydrocannabinol (THC)	rat, oral	1,270 mg/kg	1.27	
Cannabidiol (CBD)	rat, oral	980 mg/kg	0.98	
Methanol (CH_{3}OH)	human, oral	810 mg/kg	0.81	
Trinitrotoluene (TNT)	rat, oral	790 mg/kg	0.790	
Arsenic (Elemental, As)	rat, oral	763 mg/kg	0.763	
Ibuprofen	rat, oral	636 mg/kg	0.636	
Formaldehyde (CH_{2}O)	rat, oral	600–800 mg/kg	0.6	
Solanine (main alkaloid in the several plants in Solanaceae amongst them Solanum tuberosum)	rat, oral (2.8 mg/kg human, oral)	590 mg/kg	0.590	
Atropine (from Atropa bella-donna, Datura stramonium, Mandragora officinarum and Brugmansia)	rat, oral	500 mg/kg	0.500	
Piperidine	rat, oral	400 mg/kg	0.4	
Alkyl dimethyl benzalkonium chloride (ADBAC)	rat, oral fish, immersion aquatic invertebrates, immersion	304.5 mg/kg {0.28 mg/L} {0.059 mg/L}	0.3045 {0.00028} {0.000059}	
Coumarin (benzopyrone, from Cinnamomum aromaticum and other plants)	rat, oral	293 mg/kg	0.293	
Psilocybin (from psilocybin mushrooms)	mouse, oral	280 mg/kg	0.280	
Hydrochloric acid (HCl)	rat, oral	238–277 mg/kg	0.238	
Ketamine	rat, intraperitoneal	229 mg/kg	0.229	
Aspirin (acetylsalicylic acid)	rat, oral	200 mg/kg	0.2	
Caffeine	rat, oral	192 mg/kg	0.192	
Arsenic trisulfide (As_{2}S_{3})	rat, oral	185–6,400 mg/kg	0.185–6.4	
Sodium nitrite (NaNO_{2})	rat, oral	180 mg/kg	0.18	
Methylenedioxymethamphetamine (MDMA)	rat, oral	160 mg/kg	0.16	
Uranyl acetate dihydrate (UO_{2}(CH_{3}COO)_{2})	mouse, oral	136 mg/kg	0.136	
Dichlorodiphenyltrichloroethane (DDT)	mouse, oral	135 mg/kg	0.135	
Uranium (U)	mice, oral	114 mg/kg (estimated)	0.114	
Bisoprolol	mouse, oral	100 mg/kg	0.1	
Cocaine	mouse, oral	96 mg/kg	0.096	
Cobalt(II) chloride (CoCl_{2})	rat, oral	80 mg/kg	0.08	
Cadmium oxide (CdO)	rat, oral	72 mg/kg	0.072	
Thiopental sodium (used in lethal injection)	rat, oral	64 mg/kg	0.064	
Demeton-S-methyl	rat, oral	60 mg/kg	0.060	
Methamphetamine	rat, intraperitoneal	57 mg/kg	0.057	
Sodium fluoride (NaF)	rat, oral	52 mg/kg	0.052	
Nicotine	mouse and rat, oral human, smoking	50 mg/kg	0.05	
Pentaborane(9)	human, oral	50 mg/kg	0.05	
Capsaicin	mouse, oral	47.2 mg/kg	0.0472	
Vitamin D3 (cholecalciferol)	rat, oral	37 mg/kg	0.037	
Heroin (diamorphine)	mouse, intravenous	21.8 mg/kg	0.0218	
Lysergic acid diethylamide (LSD)	rat, intravenous	16.5 mg/kg	0.0165	
Arsenic trioxide (As_{2}O_{3})	rat, oral	14 mg/kg	0.014	
Metallic arsenic (As)	rat, intraperitoneal	13 mg/kg	0.013	
Coniine (from Conium maculatum)	mouse, intravenous	8 mg/kg	0.008	
Sodium cyanide (NaCN)	rat, oral	6.4 mg/kg	0.0064	
Chlorotoxin (CTX, from scorpions)	mice	4.3 mg/kg	0.0043	
Hydrogen cyanide (HCN)	mouse, oral	3.7 mg/kg	0.0037	
Carfentanil	rat, intravenous	3.39 mg/kg	0.00339	
Nicotine (from various Solanaceae genera)	mice, oral	3.3 mg/kg	0.0033	
White phosphorus (P)	rat, oral	3.03 mg/kg	0.00303	
Phenylthiocarbamide (PTC)	rat, oral	3 mg/kg	0.003	
Strychnine (from Strychnos nux-vomica)	human, oral	1–2 mg/kg (estimated)	0.001–0.002	
Aconitine (from Aconitum napellus and related species)	human, oral	1–2 mg/kg	0.001–0.002	
Mercury(II) chloride (HgCl_{2})	rat, oral	1 mg/kg	0.001	
Aldicarb	rat, oral	650 μg/kg	0.00065	
Cantharidin (from blister beetles)	human, oral	500 μg/kg	0.0005	
Aflatoxin B1 (from Aspergillus flavus mold)	rat, oral	480 μg/kg	0.00048	
Plutonium (Pu)	dog, intravenous	320 μg/kg	0.00032	
Bufotoxin (from Bufo toads)	cat, intravenous	300 μg/kg	0.0003	
Brodifacoum	rat, oral	270 μg/kg	0.00027	
Caesium-137 (^{137}Cs)	mouse, parenteral	21.5 μCi/g	0.000245	
Sodium fluoroacetate (CH_{2}FCOONa)	rat, oral	220 μg/kg	0.00022	
Chlorine trifluoride (ClF_{3})	mouse, absorption through skin	178 μg/kg	0.000178	
Sarin	mouse, subcutaneous injection	172 μg/kg	0.000172	
Robustoxin (from Sydney funnel-web spider)	mice	150 μg/kg	0.000150	
VX	human, oral, inhalation, absorption through skin/eyes	140 μg/kg (estimated)	0.00014	
Venom of the Brazilian wandering spider	rat, subcutaneous	134 μg/kg	0.000134	
Amatoxin (from Amanita phalloides mushrooms)	human, oral	100 μg/kg	0.0001	
Dimethylmercury (Hg(CH_{3})_{2})	human, transdermal	50 μg/kg	0.000050	
TBPO (t-Butyl-bicyclophosphate)	mouse, intravenous	36 μg/kg	0.000036	
Fentanyl	monkey	30 μg/kg	0.00003	
Venom of the inland taipan	rat, subcutaneous	25 μg/kg	0.000025	
Ricin (from castor oil plant)	rat, intraperitoneal rat, oral	22 μg/kg 20–30 mg/kg	0.000022; 0.02	
2,3,7,8-Tetrachlorodibenzodioxin (TCDD, in Agent Orange)	rat, oral	20 μg/kg	0.00002	
Tetrodotoxin from the blue-ringed octopus	intravenous	8.2 μg/kg	0.0000082	
CrTX-A (from Carybdea rastonii box jellyfish venom)	crayfish, intraperitoneal	5 μg/kg	0.000005	
Latrotoxin (from widow spider venom)	mice	4.3 μg/kg	0.0000043	
Epibatidine (from Epipedobates anthonyi poison dart frog)	mouse, intravenous	1.46–13.98 μg/kg	0.00000146	
Batrachotoxin (from poison dart frog)	human, sub-cutaneous injection	2–7 μg/kg (estimated)	0.000002	
Abrin (from rosary pea)	mice, intravenously human, inhalation human, oral	0.7 μg/kg 3.3 μg/kg 10–1000 μg/kg	0.0000007; 0.0000033; 0.00001–0.001	
Saxitoxin (from certain marine dinoflagellates)	human, intravenously human, oral	0.6 μg/kg 5.7 μg/kg	0.0000006; 0.0000057	
Pacific ciguatoxin-1 (from ciguateric fish)	mice, intraperitoneal	250 ng/kg	0.00000025	
Palytoxin (from Palythoa coral)	mouse, intravenous human, oral	45 ng/kg 2.3–31.5 μg/kg (estimated)	0.000000045; 0.0000023	
Maitotoxin (from ciguateric fish)	mouse, intraperitoneal	50 ng/kg	0.00000005	
Polonium-210 (^{210}Po)	human, inhalation	10 ng/kg (estimated)	0.00000001	
Diphtheria toxin (from Corynebacterium)	mice	10 ng/kg	0.00000001	
Shiga toxin (from Shigella bacteria)	mice	2 ng/kg	0.000000002	
Tetanospasmin (from Clostridium tetani)	mice	2 ng/kg	0.000000002	
Botulinum toxin (from Clostridium botulinum)	human, oral, injection, inhalation	1 ng/kg (estimated)	0.000000001	
Ionizing radiation	human, irradiation	3–5 Gy (Gray)	—	

== Poison scale ==
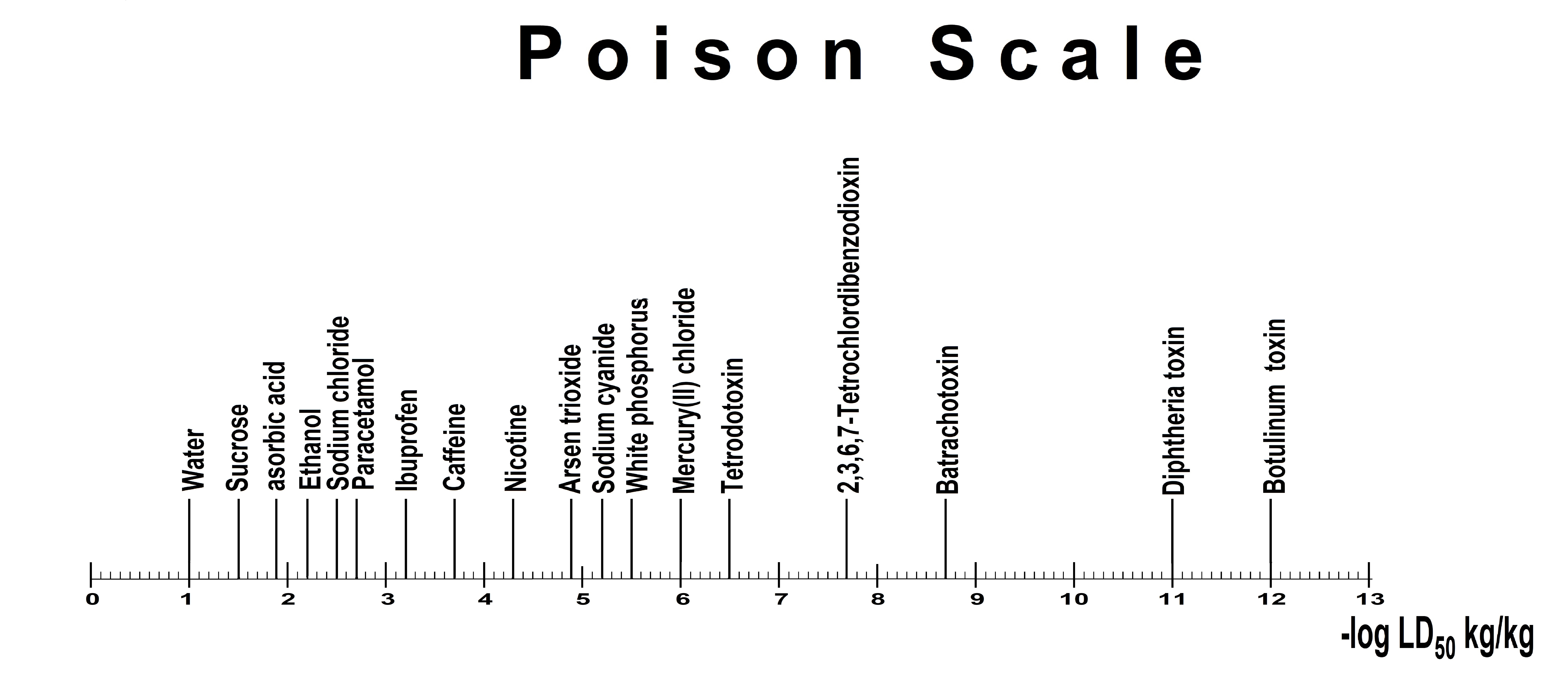
Negative values of the decimal logarithm of the median lethal dose LD_{50} (−log_{10}(LD_{50})) on a linearized toxicity scale encompassing 11 orders of magnitude. Water occupies the lowest toxicity position (1) while the toxicity scale is dominated by the botulinum toxin (12).

The LD_{50} values have a very wide range. The botulinum toxin as the most toxic substance known has an LD_{50} value of 1 ng/kg, while the most non-toxic substance water has an LD_{50} value of more than 90 g/kg; a difference of about 1 in 100 billion, or 11 orders of magnitude. As with all measured values that differ by many orders of magnitude, a logarithmic view is advisable. Well-known examples are the indication of the earthquake strength using magnitude scales, the pH value, as a measure for the acidic or basic character of an aqueous solution or of loudness in decibels. In this case, the negative decimal logarithm of the LD_{50} values, which is standardized in kg per kg body weight, is considered −log_{10}(LD_{50}).

The dimensionless value found can be entered in a toxin scale. Water as the baseline substance is nearly 1 in the negative logarithmic toxin scale.

== Procedures ==
A number of procedures have been defined to derive the LD_{50}. The earliest was the 1927 "conventional" procedure by Trevan, which requires 40 or more animals. The fixed-dose procedure, proposed in 1984, estimates a level of toxicity by feeding at defined doses and looking for signs of toxicity (without requiring death). The up-and-down procedure, proposed in 1985, yields an LD_{50} value while dosing only one animal at a time.

== See also ==
- Animal testing
- Reed-Muench method
- The dose makes the poison – the toxicology adage that high quantities of any substance is lethal

=== Other measures of toxicity ===
- IDLH
- Certain safety factor
- Therapeutic index
- Protective index
- Median toxic dose (TD50)
- Lowest published lethal dose (LDLo)
- EC_{50} (half maximal effective concentration)
- IC_{50} (half maximal inhibitory concentration)
- Draize test
- Indicative limit value
- No-observed-adverse-effect level (NOAEL)
- Lowest-observed-adverse-effect level (LOAEL)

=== Related measures ===
- TCID_{50} Tissue Culture Infective Dosage
- Plaque forming units (pfu)
