= Alun Oldfield-Davies =

Welsh broadcaster and public servant (1905–1988)

- Oldfield-Davies (1951)
- Born: Alun Bennett Oldfield-Davies; 18 April 1905; Clydach, Wales
- Died: 1 December 1988 (aged 83); Cardiff, Wales
- Occupations: broadcaster, public servant

Alun Bennett Oldfield-Davies CBE (18 April 1905 – 1 December 1988) was a Welsh broadcaster and public servant. He joined the BBC in 1937, holding several posts before being appointed director of the Welsh Region for BBC radio. Throughout his long stewardship of the BBC in Wales, he oversaw a golden age in Welsh spoken broadcasting, and always sought to increase the resources for Welsh broadcasting. He oversaw the introduction of television broadcasting in Wales, and although seen as unadventurous by some, his devotion to the Welsh language was absolute.

== Early history ==
Oldfield-Davies was born in Clydach, Swansea in 1905 to Jonathan Oldfield-Davies, a Congregational minister, and his wife, Mary, née Williams. In 1905 his father began his ministry at Clydach, having moved from north-east Wales. The family remained in Clydach until 1910, moving to Ton Pentre in the Rhondda Valley where his father took up a ministry at Bethesda Chapel. Oldfield-Davies had two siblings, sisters Ruth and Elizabeth.

He was educated at Porth county school before matriculating to the University College of Wales at Aberystwyth. He showed political leanings from his early years, becoming the president of his students' union. After leaving university Oldfield-Davies became a teacher and between 1926 and 1937 he was a schoolmaster and lecturer to university extension classes in Ammanford and Carmarthenshire. During this period he also taught history at Cathays High School for Boys. On 6 August 1931 he married fellow school teacher Lilian May Lewis.

== Career with the BBC ==
Oldfield-Davies joined the newly formed Welsh Region of the BBC's radio service in 1937, as schools organiser. He had been a regular contributor for the previous three years on the West Region station; giving talks on world events in a Welsh-language schools' programme, Cwrs y byd. His time in the role saw the number of schools receiving broadcasts rise from 126 to 700, until the start of the Second World War saw regional radio in the United Kingdom disbanded. His appointment as school's organiser has been heavily supported by the director of the Welsh region, Rhys Hopkin Morris and he took Oldfield-Davies in as a protégé. He remained working at the BBC throughout the war first as an administrative officer in Wales, but later took up a position in London as an establishment officer in London.

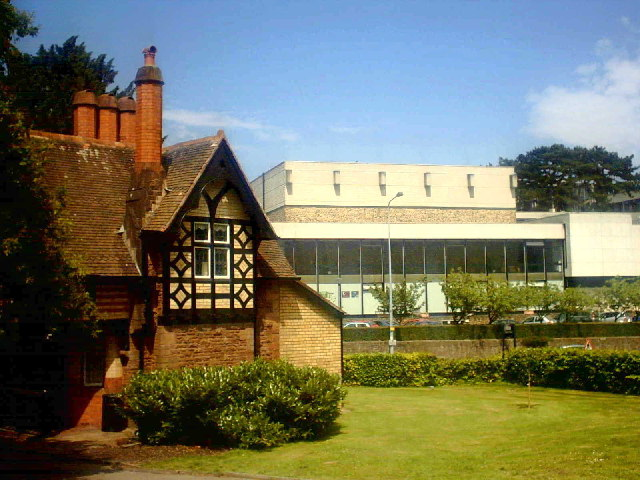
Ty Oldfield (left) with part of Broadcasting House in the background

In 1945 Hopkin Morris resigned from the BBC to re-enter the field of politics. Oldfield Davies became the acting director until he was confirmed permanently for the post on 15 June 1945. In 1948 his title was changed to controller Wales, and he remained in the post until 1967. Oldfield-Davies was to lead broadcasting in Wales through the growth of radio in the 1950s, through the advent of television in Wales the 1950s and the introduction of commercial competition with the birth of ITV in 1955. He fought tirelessly for a separate television frequency for Wales and oversaw the creation of Welsh-language television broadcasting. Writing in 1994, historian John Davies was in no doubt of the importance of Oldfield-Davies' role in Welsh broadcasting, stating: "If there was a single creator of Welsh language television, it was Alun Oldfield-Davies". Oldfield-Davies also ensured that a strong media base was present in Wales, with the creation of a substantial Welsh news-gathering organisation in both languages, and saw the relocation of the BBC in Wales to their site in Llandaff, which was completed just before his retirement in 1967. Part of the BBC's head office in Cardiff is named Ty Oldfield in his memory.

== Later life ==
Oldfield-Davies applied himself to many fields, particularly to education and the arts, after leaving the BBC. He was the president of the National Museum of Wales from 1972 until 1977. He was also a member of the Welsh Arts Council, the council of the National Eisteddfod of Wales and the Court of the National Theatre, which attempted to secure a Welsh national theatre. He was a Member of the Aberystwyth Old Students' Association and served as President (1976–77). He was appointed CBE in 1955. Oldfield-Davies was the subject of several works of art, including a series of paintings by Welsh artist Sir Kyffin Williams and a bronze portrait head by Ivor Roberts-Jones.

Oldfield-Davies died of pneumonia and rheumatic heart disease at the University Hospital of Wales, Cardiff, on 1 December 1988.

== Bibliography ==
- Davies, John (1994). Broadcasting and the BBC in Wales. Cardiff: University of Wales Press. ISBN 978-0-7083-1273-5.
- Davies, John; Jenkins, Nigel; Menna, Baines; Lynch, Peredur I., eds. (2008). The Welsh Academy Encyclopaedia of Wales. Cardiff: University of Wales Press. ISBN 978-0-7083-1953-6.
- Davies, Geraint Talfan (2011). "Alun Bennett Oldfield-Davies". Oxford Dictionary of National Biography (online ed.). Oxford University Press. doi:10.1093/ref:odnb/101151. (Subscription, Wikipedia Library access or UK public library membership required.)

Professional and academic associations
Preceded by Cyril Kinsey	President of the Aberystwyth Old Students' Association; 1976–1977	Succeeded by Mary Llewelfryn Davies
