= Newsom Report =

UK government report

The Newsom Report of 1963 is a United Kingdom government report, titled Half our Future. It argued that the future of the country depended on better education for "pupils of average and less-than-average ability". The report was produced by the Central Advisory Council for Education (England) and takes its name from the council's chairman John Newsom, Joint Managing Director of Longmans Green and Co Ltd., and formerly the County Education Officer of Hertfordshire.

== Background ==
The 1944 Butler Education Act and the similar Education (Northern Ireland) Act 1947 radically overhauled education in England and Wales and Northern Ireland. For the first time, free secondary education became a universally provided right. This was a part of the major shake-up of government welfare in the wake of the 1942 Beveridge report.

There followed three categories of state-run secondary schools.

- Grammar schools were intended to teach a highly academic curriculum, teaching students to deal with abstract concepts. There was a strong focus on intellectual subjects, such as literature, classics and advanced mathematics. Around 25% of children attending state schools were selected to attend these schools by the 11-plus examination, with the remaining 75% attending the other two types.
- Secondary technical schools were designed to train children adept in mechanical and scientific subjects. The focus of the schools was on forming scientists, engineers and technicians.
- Secondary modern schools (secondary intermediate schools in Northern Ireland) trained pupils in practical skills, aimed at equipping them for less-skilled jobs and home management.

== Terms of reference ==
To consider the education between the ages of 13 and 16 of pupils of average or less than average ability who are or will be following full-time courses either at schools or in establishments of further education. The term education shall be understood to include extra-curricular activities.

== Findings ==
The report found that the young people whose education it had considered should receive a greater share of the national resources devoted to education. The report uncovered serious examples of neglect. For example it found that some secondary moderns in slum areas of London had primary school furniture for fifteen-year-olds, and teachers changing as often as once a term.

The report was however overshadowed by the Robbins Report on higher education, which was published one week later and given more time for public debate.

== See also ==
- Raising of school leaving age in England and Wales
