= Partition equilibrium =

Type of chemical equilibrium

Partition equilibrium is a special case of chemical equilibrium wherein one or more solutes are in equilibrium between two immiscible solvents. The most common chemical equilibrium systems involve reactants and products in the same phase - either all gases or all solutions. However, it is also possible to get equilibria between substances in different phases, such a liquid and gas that do not mix (are immiscible). One example is gas-liquid partition equilibrium chromatography, where an analyte equilibrates between a gas and liquid phase. Partition equilibria are described by Nernst's distribution law. Partition equilibrium are most commonly seen and used for Liquid–liquid extraction.

The time until a partition equilibrium emerges is influenced by many factors, such as: temperature, relative concentrations, surface area of interface, degree of stirring, and the nature of the solvents and solute.

== Example ==
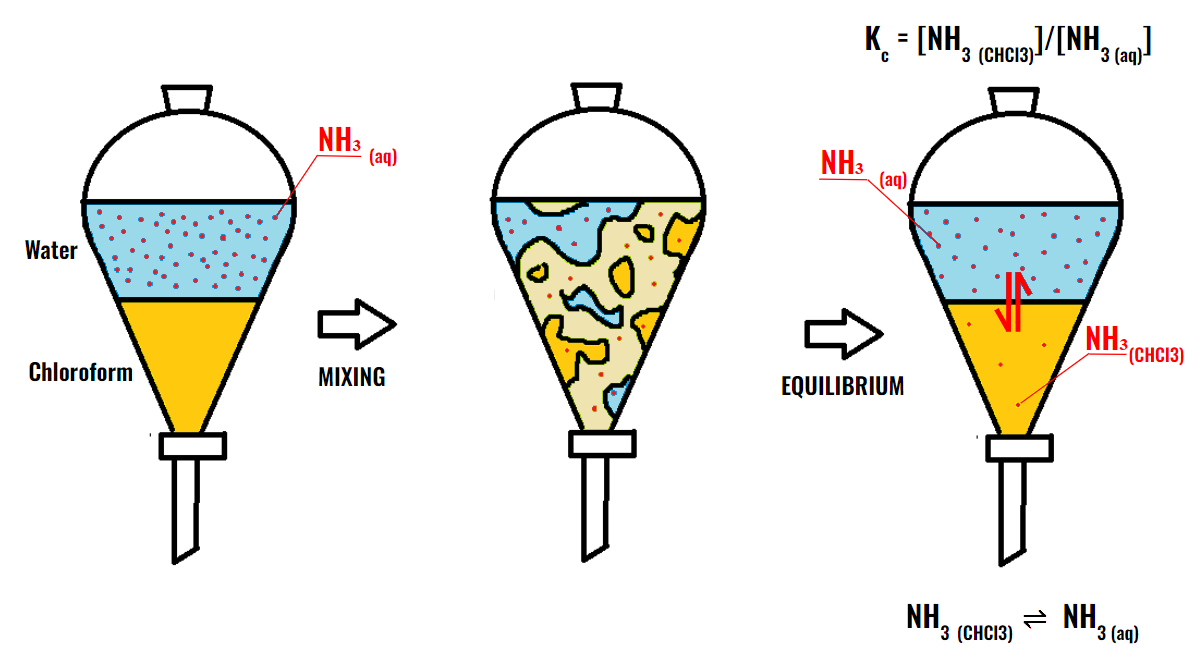
Process of establishing partition equilibrium in a separatory funnel for ammonia in water and chloroform.

For example, ammonia (NH_{3}) is soluble in both water (aq) and the organic solvent trichloromethane (CHCl_{3}) - two immiscible solvents. If ammonia is first dissolved in water, and then an equal volume of trichloromethane is added, and the two liquids shaken together, the following equilibrium is established:

K_{c} = [NH_{3} _{(CHCl3)}]/[NH_{3 (aq)}] (where K_{c} is the equilibrium constant)

The equilibrium concentrations of ammonia in each layer can be established by titration with standard acid solution. It can thus be determined that K_{c} remains constant, with a value of 0.4 in this case.

== Partition coefficient ==
This kind of equilibrium constant measures how a substance distributes or partitions itself between two immiscible solvents. It is called the partition coefficient or distribution coefficient.

== Partition equilibrium chromatography ==
See: Partition chromatography, Gas chromatography

Partition equilibrium chromatography is a type of chromatography that is typically used in gas chromatography (GC) and high performance liquid chromatography (HPLC). The stationary phase in GC is a high boiling liquid bonded to solid surface and the mobile phase is a gas. In gas-liquid chromatography, analyte from the mobile gas phase equilibrates with the liquid phase. Molecules more soluble in the liquid phase will remain longer in the column, allowing for separation using partition equilibriums.

== See also ==
- Liquid–liquid extraction
