= Up-and-down procedure =

Up-and-down procedure (or method) for toxicology tests in medicine is an alternative to the LD_{50} test, in which animals are used for acute toxicity testing. It requires fewer animals to achieve similar accuracy as the LD_{50} test because animals are dosed one at a time. If the first animal survives, the dose for the next animal is increased; if it dies, the dose is decreased. It is usual to observe each animal for 1 or 2 days before dosing the next animal, however, surviving animals should be monitored for 7 days in case of delayed death. The up-and-down method is not recommended where deaths beyond 2 days are the norm. The US EPA provides a statistical program to calculate the oral LD_{50} and 95% Confidence Limits called AOT425StatPgm. This program will notify the user when a stopping criteria has been met, while being able to generate statistically valid LD_{50}, using fewer animals. The U.S. Food and Drug Administration has begun to approve non-animal alternatives.
