= Median toxic dose =

Dose at which toxicity occurs in 50% of cases

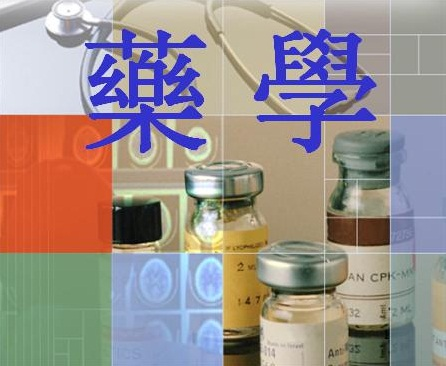

In toxicology, the median toxic dose (TD_{50}) of a drug or toxin is the dose at which toxicity occurs in 50% of cases. The type of toxicity should be specified for this value to have meaning for practical purposes. The median toxic dose encompasses the category of toxicity that is greater than half maximum effective concentration (ED_{50}) but less than the median lethal dose (LD_{50}). However, for some highly potent toxins (ex. lofentanil, botulinum toxin) the difference between the ED_{50} and TD_{50} is so minute that the values assigned to them may be approximated to equal doses. Since toxicity need not be lethal, the TD_{50} is generally lower than the median lethal dose (LD_{50}), and the latter can be considered an upper bound for the former. However, since the toxicity is above the effective limit, the TD_{50} is generally greater than the ED_{50}. If the result of a study is a toxic effect that does not result in death, it is classified as this form of toxicity. Toxic effects can be defined differently, sometimes considering the therapeutic effect of a substance to be toxic (such as with chemotherapeutics) which can lead to confusion and contention regarding a substance's TD_{50}. Examples of these toxic endpoints include cancer, blindness, anemia, and birth defects.
