= Effective dose (pharmacology) =

Dose or concentration of a drug which induces a biological response

In pharmacology, an effective dose (ED) or effective concentration (EC) is the dose or concentration of a drug that produces a biological response. The term "effective dose" is used when measurements are taken in vivo, while "effective concentration" is used when the measurements are taken in vitro.

It has been stated that any substance can be toxic at a high enough dose. This concept was demonstrated in 2007 when a California woman died of water intoxication in a contest sanctioned by a radio station. The line between efficacy and toxicity is dependent upon the particular patient, although the dose administered by a physician should fall into the predetermined therapeutic window of the drug.

The importance of determining the therapeutic range of a drug cannot be overstated. This is generally defined by the range between the minimum effective dose (MED) and the maximum tolerated dose (MTD). The MED is defined as the lowest dose level of a pharmaceutical product that provides a clinically significant response in average efficacy, which is also statistically significantly superior to the response provided by the placebo. Similarly, the MTD is the highest possible but still tolerable dose level with respect to a pre-specified clinical limiting toxicity. In general, these limits refer to the average patient population. For instances in which there is a large difference between the MED and MTD, it is stated that the drug has a large therapeutic window. Conversely, if the range is relatively small, or if the MTD is less than the MED, then the pharmaceutical product will have little to no practical value.

== ED_{50} ==
The median effective dose is the dose that produces a quantal effect (all or nothing) in 50% of the population that takes it (median referring to the 50% population base). It is also sometimes abbreviated as the ED_{50}, meaning "effective dose for 50% of the population". The ED_{50} is commonly used as a measure of the reasonable expectancy of a drug effect, but does not necessarily represent the dose that a clinician might use. This depends on the need for the effect, and also the toxicity. The toxicity and even the lethality of a drug can be quantified by the TD_{50} and LD_{50} respectively. Ideally, the effective dose would be substantially less than either the toxic or lethal dose for a drug to be therapeutically relevant.

== ED_{95} ==
The ED_{95} is the dose required to achieve the desired effect in 95% of the population.

In anaesthesia, the term ED_{95} is also used when referring to the pharmacology of neuromuscular blocking drugs. In this context, it is the dose which will cause 95% depression of the height of a single muscle twitch, in half of the population. Put another way, it is the ED_{50} for 95% reduction in twitch height. The single twitch response occurs when a nerve stimulator is used to stimulate the ulnar nerve, and the degree of twitch of the adductor pollicus muscle is measured. A more accurate nomenclature when used in this way would be "ED_{50}95".

== See also ==
- List of abbreviations used in medical prescriptions
- Certain safety factor
- LD_{50}
