= Timeline of ITN =

This is a timeline of the history of ITN (Independent Television News), a British production company providing news programmes for British broadcasters.

== 1950s ==
- 1955
  - January – A consortium of the initial four Independent Television (ITV) broadcasting companies launch ITN, which will provide the new network with its news service.
  - 22 September – The first ITN news bulletin is broadcast at 10 pm on ITV's launch night.
- 1956
  - No events.
- 1957
  - No events.
- 1958
  - No events.
- 1959
  - 8 October – ITN broadcasts its first election results programme to provide ITV with live coverage of the results of the 1959 United Kingdom general election.

== 1960s ==
- 1960 to 1966
  - No events.
- 1967
  - 3 July – News at Ten is launched as a 13-week trial of a nightly 30 minute bulletin. The programme is an immediate success with the audience and is soon made permanent.
- 1968
  - No events.
- 1969
  - August – ITN moves to ITN House at 48 Wells Street, close to the BBC's Broadcasting House.

== 1970s ==
- 1970
  - No events.
- 1971
  - No events.
- 1972
  - 16 October – Following a law change which removed all restrictions on broadcasting hours, ITV is able to launch an afternoon service. As part of the new service ITV's first lunchtime news programme, First Report, is shown.
- 1973
  - No events.
- 1974
  - 7 September – First Report is moved to a 1pm start time.
- 1975
  - No events.
- 1976
  - 6 September – News at One replaces First Report and the teatime news bulletin programme is extended by five minutes and renamed News at 5.45.
- 1977
  - No events.
- 1978
  - ITV's teletext service ORACLE launches with ITN providing the news pages.
- 1979
  - 10 August to 24 October – ITV News is off air because of the ITV technicians' strike.

== 1980s ==
- 1980
  - No events.
- 1981
  - No events.
- 1982
  - 2 November – On the day of the launch of Channel 4, Channel 4 News is broadcast for the first time with ITN as the programme's producer. The 60-minute programme is broadcast each weeknight at 7pm. At the weekend, the only news is a single two-minute summary broadcast at teatime.
- 1983
  - No events.
- 1984
  - No events.
- 1985
  - No events.
- 1986
  - No events.
- 1987
  - ITN World News is launched as part of the launch of pan-European Super Channel.
  - 20 July – The lunchtime news programme moves to 12:30pm and is renamed accordingly.
  - 7 September – ITV launches a full morning programme schedule, with advertising, for the first time. The new service includes regular five-minute national news bulletins.
- 1988
  - 15 February – An early morning 60-minute news programme – ITN Early Morning News – is launched but is only available in areas which have 24-hour broadcasting. The first 30 minutes of the programme includes a full broadcast of ITN's international news bulletin ITN World News. In addition, brief news summaries are broadcast at various points through the night.
  - 7 March – The lunchtime news returns to the 1pm slot.
- 1989
  - 3 April – The Channel 4 Daily launches with ITN providing the news input into the new breakfast service.

== 1990s ==
- 1990
  - No events.
- 1991
  - 7 January – The lunchtime news returns to the 12:30pm slot.
  - 16 January–2 March – ITN provides ITV with extensive live coverage of the Gulf War, both in terms of extended news bulletins and special programmes, including a daily bulletin at 9:25am and all-night coverage during the initial stages of the War.
  - 3 March – Following the conclusion of the Gulf War, the ITN Early Morning News is halved in length and now goes on air at 5:30am. From this point, the ITN World News is no longer broadcast as part of the bulletin.
  - ITN moves its headquarters to 200 Gray's Inn Road.
- 1992
  - 2 March – The News at 5.40 is renamed ITN Early Evening News.
  - 25 September – The Channel 4 Daily is broadcast for the final time.
  - 28 September – Channel 4's new breakfast programme The Big Breakfast launches. ITN provides the news updates which sees one-minute headline summaries every 20 minutes with extended bulletins at 7am and 8am.
  - 5 October – ITN replaces LBC as the operator of Independent Radio News.
- 1993
  - No events.
- 1994
  - No events.
- 1995
  - No events.
- 1996
  - London News Radio, in which ITN holds a stake, is formed and buys London Radio Services which operates the two London news licenses - London News 97.3FM and London News Talk 1152AM.
  - 14 November – London News 97.3 is relaunched as News Direct 97.3 following the move of the station to ITN's headquarters.
- 1997
  - 31 March – 5 News launches following the foundation of Channel 5 with ITN winning the contract to provide the channel’s news service.
  - December – ITN purchases a 49% share of Euronews for £5.1 million. ITN supplied the content of the channel along with the remaining shareholders.
  - ITN starts producing the Royal Christmas Message every other year.
- 1998
  - No events.
- 1999
  - 8 March – Major changes to ITV's news programmes take place, including different times for the channel's news programmes and the programmes are now referred to as ITV News rather than ITN News. The main bulletin of the day is now considered to be the Evening News and is moved from 5:40pm to 6:30pm and the late night news is controversially pushed back to 11pm. Also ITV's lunchtime news bulletin is relaunched as ITV Lunchtime News.

== 2000s ==
- 2000
  - 1 August
    - At 6am ITN launches ITN News Radio. It broadcasts nationally on the recently launched Digital One multiplex.
    - At 1:30pm the ITN News Channel launches. The channel is a joint venture between ITN and NTL. It broadcasts full time on Sky Digital and cable and is available during the morning on OnDigital.
  - News Direct 97.3 is renamed with the ITN brand and is now called ITN News Direct 97.3FM.
- 2001
  - ITN fights off a bid from British Sky Broadcasting to continue to provide ITV with its news service.
  - 22 January – ITV reinstates ITV News at Ten, with Trevor McDonald presenting the new bulletin. The bulletin airs on three nights of the week. Friday nights sees the late news kept at 11pm and named ITV Weekend News. On one other night of the week, the News at Ten could be moved to accommodate movies or sporting events. For the first few months, the late regional news was maintained before being moved from 10.30pm to 10.20pm to create a half hour block of news. The reversal comes after the Independent Television Commission forced ITV to move the late evening news back to 10pm on three nights each week.
  - ITN World News is broadcast for the final time.
- 2002
  - 30 September – The ITN News Channel is renamed ITV News Channel following the purchase of the channel by Carlton and Granada.
  - Late 2002 – London Radio Services, in which ITN has a stake, is sold to Chrysalis Radio. The new owner drops the ITN prefix and returns to its previous name.
- 2003
  - The Iraq War sees Channel 4 launch a new 30-minute lunchtime news bulletin. The programme is retained following the end of the conflict due to the bulletin’s instant popularity.
  - 19 March – ITN provides live extensive coverage of the Iraq War with extended news coverage on ITV and rolling coverage on the ITV News Channel. For the duration of the conflict, News at Ten is moved to 9pm and the ITV Evening News is extended to 60 minutes and simulcast of the ITV News Channel aired from 12am to 5:30am every night on ITV1.
  - 4 April – ITN sells its stake in Euronews as part of its drive to streamline operations and focus on news-gathering rather than channel management.
  - 1 July – ITN's news radio station stops broadcasting on Digital One.
- 2004
  - 2 February – After several years of inconsistent scheduling of late evening news, the bulletin moves to a 10:30pm start time five nights a week.
  - 1 March – Following its acquisition of the London News Network, a company previously owned by the now merged Carlton and Granada, ITN begins producing local news bulletins for the ITV London region.
- 2005
  - 1 January – Sky News replaces ITN as news provider to Channel 5.
  - 11 February – The ITV Lunchtime News is extended to last 60 minutes.
  - 10 October – The first edition of More4 News is broadcast to coincide with the launch of More4.
  - 23 December – The ITV News Channel stops broadcasting at 6pm. Poor ratings in comparison to BBC News 24 and Sky News and ITV's desire to reuse the channel's allocation on Freeview, were cited as the reasons.
- 2006
  - 4 September – The ITV Lunchtime News reverts to being a 30-minute programme and its start time is moved back to 1:30pm.
- 2007
  - 29 September – Setanta Sports News launches with ITN as the channel’s producer.
- 2008
  - 14 January – ITV News at Ten returns to the schedules on four nights each week, the Friday edition remains at 11pm.
  - October – ITN founds digital production company Diagonal View as a joint venture with digital entrepreneur Matt Heiman. The company packages footage from the ITN archive and syndicates it to a range of commercial partners including MySpace, YouTube and MSN.
- 2009
  - 2 March – Sky News replaces ITN as the news supplier for Independent Radio News. The final bulletin is broadcast at 1pm.
  - 23 June – Following Setanta Sports being placed into administration, Setanta Sports News closes, at 6pm with 60 staff made redundant.
  - 18 December – More4 News and Channel 4 News at Noon are broadcast for the final time.

== 2010s ==
- 2010
  - February – ITN Productions is formed and incorporates the non-news operations of ITN, including the former ITN On, ITN Factual and ITN Corporate divisions.
- 2011
  - No events.
- 2012
  - 1 January – ITN regains the contract to provide news for Channel 5.
  - 21 December – The final edition of ITV's early morning news programme ITV News at 5:30 is broadcast. Consequently, there is no longer any overnight news coverage on ITV.
- 2013
  - 14 January – ITV News reveals its new-look newsroom studio featuring the blue and teal green set replacing the previous black and yellow version.
  - August – ITN Productions begins producing Premier League online and mobile highlights service for News UK. Content appears on The Sun and The Times subscription websites and mobile apps.
- 2014
  - No events.
- 2015
  - October – A new format for ITV News at Ten is launched as part of a move to enhance the reputation of ITV's news and current affairs output.
- 2016
  - At the end of 2016, ITN Source, which licensed ITN’s video footage, closes following the decision to outsource its archive sales to Getty Images.
- 2017
  - March – Diagonal View is sold to Sky, who paid £2.6m for ITN's stake.
- 2018
  - No events.
- 2019
  - No events.

== 2020s ==
- 2020
  - No events.
- 2021
  - No events.
- 2022
  - 7 March – The ITV Evening News is extended to an hour, following the biggest expansion of ITV News production in 20 years. The move includes hiring 27 new staff which will include journalists, producers and camera operators. ITV said the move would also ensure more live coverage would be provided from more locations across the UK, with an emphasis to cover more stories around Britain. ITV Border Scotland, ITV Cymru Wales, STV and UTV have the option of opting-out of the Friday edition of the programme at 7pm to broadcast regional shows. The bulletin's time-slot is occasionally abbreviated to 30 minutes during the week, in the event of ITV Sport coverage airing on ITV, during the semi-finals week of Britain's Got Talent, and some one-off programmes.
- 2023
  - No events.
- 2024
  - No events.
- 2025
  - No events.
- 2026
  - 5 January – As part of cost-cutting measures across ITV's daytime lineup, Good Morning Britain becomes an ITV News programme, switching from being produced by ITV Studios Daytime to ITN. In addition, the ITV Lunchtime News begins airing at 12:30pm instead of 1:30pm, and new sets are introduced for both national and London news which are shared with the GMB set.

== See also ==
- Timeline of ITV
- Timeline of ITV News
