= Timeline of ITV News =

This is a timeline of the history of ITV News on the British television network ITV.

== 1950s ==
- 1955
  - January – A consortium of the initial four Independent Television broadcasting companies launch ITN which will provide ITV with its news service.
  - 22 September – The first news bulletin is broadcast at 10pm on ITV's launch night.
- 1956
  - 17 February – ITV begins broadcasting in the Midlands.
  - 3 May – ITV starts broadcasting across the north of England.
- 1957
  - 31 August – ITV starts broadcasting in central Scotland.
- 1958
  - 14 January – ITV begins broadcasting in South Wales and the West of England.
  - 30 August – ITV begins broadcasting across southern England.
- 1959
  - 15 January – ITV commences transmissions across north east England.
  - 8 October – ITV broadcasts its first election results programme to provide ITV with live coverage of the results of the 1959 United Kingdom general election.
  - 27 October – ITV starts broadcasting across to east England.
  - 31 October – ITV launches in Northern Ireland.

== 1960s ==
- 1960
  - 31 January – ITV begins broadcasting to south east England. following the Independent Television Authority granting Southern the right to broadcast to South East England.
- 1961
  - 29 April – ITV starts broadcasting to south west England.
  - 1 September – ITV begins broadcasting to the Scottish Borders.
  - 30 September – ITV begins broadcasting across northern Scotland.
- 1962
  - 1 September – ITV begins broadcasting to the Channel Islands.
  - 14 September – The final part of the UK gets an ITV service when Wales (West and North) Television launches in West and North Wales.
- 1963
  - No events.
- 1964
  - No events.
- 1965
  - 26 March – ITV begins broadcasting to the Isle of Man.
- 1966
  - No events.
- 1967
  - 3 July – News at Ten is launched as a 13-week trial of a nightly 30 minute bulletin. The programme is an immediate success with the audience and is soon made permanent.
- 1968
  - No events.
- 1969
  - No events.

== 1970s ==
- 1970
  - No events.
- 1971
  - No events.
- 1972
  - 1 October – The UK's first Sunday politics programme Weekend World is broadcast on ITV.
  - 16 October – Following a law change which removed all restrictions on broadcasting hours, ITV is able to launch an afternoon service. As part of the new service ITV's first lunchtime news programme, First Report, is shown.
- 1973
  - No events.
- 1974
  - 7 September – First Report is moved to a 1pm start time.
- 1975
  - No events.
- 1976
  - 6 September – News at One replaces First Report and the teatime news bulletin programme is extended by five minutes and renamed News at 5.45.
- 1977
  - No events.
- 1978
  - ITV's teletext service ORACLE launches with ITN providing the news pages.
- 1979
  - No events.

== 1980s ==
- 1980
  - No events.
- 1981
  - No events.
- 1982
  - ITV provides extensive coverage of the Falklands War with newsflashes supplemented by additional and extended news bulletins.
- 1983
  - 1 February – The launch of ITV's breakfast television service TV-am sees the introduction of news bulletins at breakfast time with bulletins on weekdays aired every 30 minutes. This frequency of weekday breakfast news bulletins continues to this day.
- 1984
  - No events.
- 1985
  - No events.
- 1986
  - No events.
- 1987
  - 20 July – The lunchtime news programme moves to 12:30pm and is renamed accordingly.
  - 7 September – ITV launches a full morning programme schedule, with advertising for the first time. The new service includes hourly five-minute national and regional news bulletins.
- 1988
  - 15 February – An early morning 60-minute news programme, ITN Early Morning News is launched but is only available in areas which have 24-hour broadcasting. The first 30 minutes of the programme includes a full broadcast of ITN's international news bulletin ITN World News. In addition, brief news summaries are broadcast at various points through the night.
  - 7 March – The lunchtime news returns to the 1pm slot.
- 1989
  - 13 February – The introduction of a national weather forecast at the end of national news bulletins results in the News at 5.45 starting earlier at 5:40pm, being extended in length and the title being changed to News at 540.

== 1990s ==
- 1990
  - No events.
- 1991
  - 7 January – The lunchtime news returns to the 12:30pm slot.
  - 16 January–2 March – ITV broadcasts extensive live coverage of the Gulf War, both in terms of extended news bulletins and special programmes, including a daily bulletin at 9:25am (replacing the game show Runway) and an all-night bulletin during the initial stages of the War.
  - 3 March – Following the conclusion of the Gulf War, the ITN Early Morning News is halved in length and now goes on air at 5:30am. Some time later, the ITN World News ceases to be broadcast as part of the bulletin.
- 1992
  - February – TV-am closes its in-house news service and contracts out news bulletins to Sky News. This is the first time that any output from Sky News has been seen on terrestrial television and continues until 31 December, TV-am's last day on air.
  - 2 March – News at 540 is renamed ITN Early Evening News.
- 1993
  - No events.
- 1994
  - No events.
- 1995
  - 15 July – ITV News bulletins all carry the same look for the first time when ITN programmes are relaunched with a unified look.
- 1996
  - No events.
- 1997
  - 31 August – ITV makes a newsflash during a commercial break of Night of the Hunter (shown on London News Network's ITV Night Time) about Diana, Princess of Wales's car crash. The network then continues with its normal late night programming before interrupting a repeat of The Chart Show (also on ITV Night Time) to commence open-ended news coverage from ITN, shortly before her death is announced. The news coverage was anchored by Dermot Murnaghan and Nicholas Owen. After handing over to GMTV at 6am (who runs in its weekday length), its unbroken news coverage of Diana's death resumes at 9:25am and lasts well into the evening (with an interruption for the lunchtime children's current affairs programme Straight Up!) with Coronation Street, Heartbeat and the film Sharpe's Eagle being the only scheduled programmes airing that day. Among the programmes to be pulled from the day's schedule Survival Special, Alright on the Night's Cock-Up Trip, and The Deadly Companions.
  - 6 September – ITV broadcasts live coverage of the funeral of Diana, Princess of Wales. It is watched by 32.1 million viewers at home, making it the biggest audience for a live broadcast ever. The ceremony's footage goes down in the Guinness World Records as the biggest TV audience for a live broadcast.
  - ITV, via ITN, starts producing the Royal Christmas Message every other year.
- 1998
  - No events.
- 1999
  - 5 March – ITV News at Ten is broadcast for the final time.
  - 8 March – Major changes to ITV's news programmes take place, including different times for the channel's news programmes and the programmes were referred to as ITV News rather than ITN News. The main bulletin of the day is now considered to be the Early Evening News and is moved from 5:40pm to 6:30pm and the evening news is controversially pushed back to 11pm. Also, ITV's lunchtime news bulletin is relaunched as ITV Lunchtime News. ITN references remain on reporter namechecks.

== 2000s ==
- 2000
  - 1 August – The ITN News Channel launches.
- 2001
  - 22 January – ITV reinstates ITV News at Ten. The bulletin airs on three nights of the week. Friday nights sees the late news kept at 11pm and named ITV Weekend News. On one other night of the week, the News at Ten could be moved to accommodate movies or sporting events. For the first few months, the late regional news was maintained before being moved from 10:30pm to 10:20pm to create a half hour block of news. The reversal comes after the Independent Television Commission forced ITV to move the late evening news back to 10pm on three nights each week. The reinstatement also saw ITV Evening News move to a two-presenter format.
  - 11 September – ITV1 makes a news report about a terrorist act in New York City after the first part of Crossroads ended. The news coverage then cancels a repeat of Catchphrase and sends the CITV programming block, The People Versus and the repeat of that day's episode of Crossroads to ITV2. Afternoon and evening local news and magazine programmes are dropped, while Emmerdale airs normally. Another news special replaces The Real EastEnders, with Who Wants to Be a Millionaire? airing in its normal time, while ITV News at Ten starts an hour early (displacing The Bill), followed by delayed regional news and The Big Match. Nightime programming (The Web Review, another edition of The Big Match, World Sport, Nationwide Football League Extra, American Judge Judy and ITV Nightscreen) are all dropped, in favour of more news and a simulcast of NBC's coverage.
- 2002
  - January – All ITN references are dropped except at the end credits.
  - 30 September – Carlton and Granada purchase the two year-old ITN News Channel and it is renamed ITV News Channel. Studio production was moved from the ITN newsroom studio to the ITV News set in the basement of ITN headquarters.
- 2003
  - 19 March – ITV provides live extensive coverage of the Iraq War with extended news coverage on ITV and rolling coverage on the ITV News Channel. News at Ten is moved to 9pm for the duration of the conflict and the ITV Evening News was extended to 60 minutes. A simulcast of the ITV News Channel aired from midnight to 5:30am every night on ITV.
  - 22 June – National bulletins ditch the red and yellow graphics scheme in favor of blue and yellow to match the ITV1 logo.
- 2004
  - 2 February – After several years of inconsistent scheduling of the late evening news, the bulletin moves to five nights a week with a 10:30pm start time. With the merger of Granada and Carlton to form ITV plc, all regional news programmes relaunched with the same blue and yellow graphics as ITV News bulletins that relaunched that same morning. National ITV News bulletins and the ITV News Channel moves in to a brand new set to mark the merger.
- 2005
  - 11 February – The ITV Lunchtime News is extended to last 60 minutes.
  - 23 December – The ITV News Channel stops broadcasting at 6pm. Poor ratings in comparison to BBC News 24 and Sky News and ITV's desire to reuse the channel's allocation on Freeview were cited as the reasons.
- 2006
  - 4 September – The ITV Lunchtime News reverts to being a 30-minute programme and its start time is moved back to 1:30pm.
- 2007
  - 1 April – ITN announced that ITV had awarded it a 6-year contract to produce ITV News, at a cost of £250 million.
  - 2 December – ITV News begins broadcasting in 16:9 widescreen.
- 2008
  - 14 January – ITV News at Ten returns to the schedules on four nights each week, the Friday edition remains at 11pm.
- 2009
  - 2 November – ITV News is rebranded. At the heart of the revamp is the removal of the famous image of the Big Ben clock tower from the opening sequence of ITV News programmes including News at Ten, ITV executives felt that after "months of deliberation" that the imagery of the landmark promoted London-centricity to viewers outside the capital. A clockface is remained as part of the studio backdrop and also appears within the opening titles and the headline bongs are also retained. New theme music is introduced which incorporates only a few elements of the previous ITV News theme.
  - 15 December – With the exception of its travel and holiday sections, ITV's teletext service stops broadcasting.

== 2010s ==
- 2010
  - No events.
- 2011
  - No events.
- 2012
  - 21 December – The final edition of ITV's early morning news programme ITV News at 5:30 is broadcast. Consequently, there is no longer any overnight news coverage on ITV.
- 2013
  - 14 January – Regional news services are rebranded with the ITV News name, for example, Anglia Tonight is renamed ITV News Anglia and Central News is now ITV News Central.
- 2014
  - No events.
- 2015
  - October – A new format for ITV News at Ten is launched as part of a move to enhance the reputation of ITV's news and current affairs output.
- 2016
  - No events.
- 2017
  - No events.
- 2018
  - No events.
- 2019
  - No events.

== 2020s ==
- 2020
  - No events.
- 2021
  - No events.
- 2022
  - 7 March – ITV launches an extended ITV Evening News with its running time increased from 30 to 60 minutes with greater focus on stories and events outside London.
  - 8 December – ITV launches its streaming service ITVX and the service provides ITV News around the clock plus an on-demand service for in-depth investigations, explanatory and eye-witness journalism. The service is not a conventional rolling news channel. Instead, the service will focus on "video on-demand" content which they promise will be continuously updated.
- 2023
  - December – ITVX begins hosting a programme covering Prime Minister's Questions.
- 2024
  - January – ITV begins operating a pop-up rolling news channel to provide breaking news coverage during major events.
- 2025
  - No events.
- 2026
  - 5 January – As part of cost-cutting measures across ITV's daytime lineup, Good Morning Britain becomes an ITV News programme, switching from being produced by ITV Studios Daytime to ITN. In addition, the ITV Lunchtime News begins airing at 12:30pm instead of 1:30pm, and new sets are introduced for both national and London news which are shared with the GMB set.

== See also ==
- Timeline of ITV
- Timeline of ITN
- Timeline of regional news on ITV
