= Joyce Ohajah =

British journalist

Joyce Ohajah is a British journalist, previously working on ITV London's regional news programme, London Tonight, and the national ITV Morning News. She was formerly a regular presenter on the ITV News Channel.
