= Mini Movie Channel =

Russian online video portal

Mini Movie Channel is an online video portal, production company and distribution company affiliated with Russia-based REN Media Group, and established by Dmitry Lesnevsky. Mini Movie Channel also produces short-films using new digital technology called the Star Imitation System.

Mini Movie Channel is listed as a production company for an upcoming television series called "Hollywood on the Rocks" hosted by Chris Gore.
