= Brighterly =

Online K–12 math and reading learning platform

Brighterly is an educational tech that operates an online learning platform for school students in the United States. Some customers have criticised Brighterly's cancellation and refund process, reporting difficulty ending subscriptions without contacting support and disputes over refunds requested after the company's 10-day refund window. It provides one-on-one tutoring in mathematics and English language arts.

== History ==
Brighterly was founded in 2021 to provide personalized instruction as an alternative to standardized teaching methods. By 2022, Brighterly offered mathematics lessons for students in grades 1–9. In 2023, the company launched its own learning platform, which brought tutors and students together in a single space with additional tools to support the learning process.

In 2024, it expanded from mathematics into reading and English language arts (ELA). In 2025, the company was a finalist in the Math Solution and Tutoring Solution categories of the EdTech Awards. In June 2026, Brighterly won the "Student Personalization Solution of the Year" category at the EdTech Breakthrough Awards. In July, Time and Statista placed Brighterly first in their World's EdTech Rising Stars 2026 subranking. In 2026, a learning platform introduced AI-generated lesson summaries and independent Math Practice and Reading Practice features designed to supplement its one-on-one lessons.

== Description ==
Lot of customers have criticised Brighterly's cancellation and refund process and other shady techniques.

Brighterly provides one-on-one online lessons in mathematics and English language arts for students in grades K–12. The platform combines live instruction with interactive and gamified learning materials and tools for assessing student progress.

Artificial intelligence is used primarily to support lesson preparation and learning activities rather than replace tutors. In 2025, Fast Company reported that Brighterly used AI to generate educational content and personalized assessment materials. In 2026, the company expanded its AI features with automated lesson summaries and self-practice tools.
