= Owen Thomas (journalist) =

Owen Thomas is the "Global Head of Editorial Content" for ING Research. Previously, he was a news presenter on BBC World News and BBC World Service and an anchor on CNN International and Bloomberg Television.

== Journalism career ==
Thomas worked for many years at ITN, presenting the now defunct ITV News Channel, the networked ITV Morning News and the regional ITV programme London Tonight.

He spent a year presenting the news on the BBC World Service, and anchored their World Briefing programme. Previously he worked for the English language service of Radio France Internationale based in Paris, France.

Before it closed down in December 2005, he was a presenter on the ITV News Channel. He and Faye Barker covered the last hour of the news channel's final broadcast, before handing to Alastair Stewart for a special closing programme.

Since joining ITN in 2001 he has broken some of the biggest national and international news. For years he helped wake up the nation on BBC Radio 1's Newsbeat.

At CNN International he was one of the anchors of CNN Today, CNN World News and Business International. At the BBC, Thomas was on air when the 2008 Marriott Hotel bombing happened. He also presented continuously for many hours when Israeli troops moved into Gaza in 2009.
