= Mark Webster (journalist) =

British journalist, correspondent for ITN

- Born: 21 November 1953 (age 72); Birmingham, Warwickshire, England
- Education: The King's School, Worcester
- Occupations: Journalist, correspondent, media advisor
- Employer: ITN (1982–2004)
- Known for: Journalist and media consultant

Mark Webster (born 1953) is an English journalist of over thirty years' standing. He is a former correspondent for Independent Television News, having worked for the company for over twenty years. He was its Industrial Correspondent, Northern Correspondent, Political Correspondent, Business Correspondent, Business Editor, Moscow Correspondent, Ireland Correspondent and a presenter of the ITV Morning News. He was also news correspondent for five news, at the time produced by Sky News for Channel five television.

== Early life ==
Webster was born on 21 November 1953 in Birmingham, Warwickshire.

== Education ==
Webster was educated at the King's School, a boarding independent school for boys (now a co-educational day school) in the county town of Worcester in Worcestershire, between the years 1962–1972, where he was a day pupil at Wulstan House.

== Life and career ==
After leaving school, Webster joined the Gloucestershire Echo newspaper. After a year on the paper, he moved to Paris where he worked as a freelance broadcaster and journalist. On his return to London, he joined the London Evening Standard as a leader writer. In 1977, he joined the Financial Times and became its Africa Correspondent, and then its Industrial Correspondent.

In September 1982, Webster joined Independent Television News as a scriptwriter for ITN's Channel 4 News, and in 1983 became ITN Industrial Correspondent for ITN programmes on ITV. He reported extensively on the year-long miners' strike, the arrest of Arthur Scargill and the miners' subsequent return to work. In September 1987, he was appointed ITN's Northern Correspondent.

In 1990, Webster became ITN Political Correspondent, based at ITN's Westminster bureau, covering the 1992 General Election and the political troubles facing John Major's Government after his re-election with a much-reduced Conservative majority. In March 1994, he became ITN Business Correspondent, followed by ITN Business Editor in 1995.

In 1998, Webster became ITN Moscow Correspondent, reporting on the political problems of Boris Yeltsin and Russian-US relations, and in 2000, became ITN Ireland Correspondent.

In 2003, Webster became a presenter of the ITV Morning News and a News Correspondent based in the UK. In 2005, he became a news correspondent at five news, with its news content provided by Sky News.

In June 2007, Webster became a senior media spokesman for Menzies Campbell, the then-leader of the Liberal Democrats, working alongside Puja Darbari, Sir Menzies's Press Secretary and Communications Director Jon Oates. Sir Menzies said: "Mark is a highly experienced journalist and I am delighted that he has agreed to join our communications team. He has the perfect experience for this role and I know that he will make a significant contribution to our communications as we prepare for the next general election."

In 2008, Webster became Director of Communications for the Charities Aid Foundation, and in 2012, a Strategic Communications Associate for the Thomson (Media) Foundation.
