= REN Media Group =

Russian media company based in Moscow

- Native name: REN Media Group
- Genre: Media group
- Founded: Moscow, Russia
- Headquarters: Moscow, Russia
- Key people: Director-general: Dmitry Lesnevsky
- Services: Informational agency, news web portal, business newspaper, business magazine, business television
- Owner: Dmitry Lesnevsky

REN Media Group is a media company based in Moscow, Russia and established by Dmitry Lesnevsky. REN Media Group USA is the company's American arm and is also affiliated with Mini Movie Channel.
