= Pier Luigi Stefani =

Pier Luigi Stefani is a producer of programs for the first Italian Private TV is taken care of international relations for co-productions and realizes the first independent TV News in Italy. Both Director and founder of Videomusic. With a French Company (NBDC) realizes videoclips and a weekly program, released to the most important European TV (TF1, BBC, ZDF, TVE etc.): RAPIDO, directed by Jean Baptiste Mondino and with the profitable consultancy of Jean Paul Gautier and Azzedine Alaya.

Founder of "Telematix", Company that it is taken care of multimedia communication. The services of Telematix open the doors to the large public at Videotel, owned by Telecom Italia (Italian Telephone Company). In 1989 it participates in the acquisition of the satellite TV Super Channel, of whom becomes Executive Deputy-President. In Joint-ventures with the Russian Agency of information "Novosti" produces the first weekly magazine that tells the Soviet Union from its inside :" Russian Eleven". "Gosteleradio", the Russian TV of State, entrusts him the direction of the Third National Channel, the first one offered to private management, named 2x2 (Tv channel)
