= GIGA Television =

German television channel

GIGA
- Headquarters: Düsseldorf, Germany (1998–2005); Cologne, Germany (2006–2011); Berlin, Germany (2011–present)

Ownership
- Owner: Deutsche Fernsehnachrichten Agentur (DFA) (1998–2004); GIGA Television GmbH (2005–2007); Premiere (2008–March 2009); Fox Interactive Media (online only, 2009–March 2011); ECONA Internet AG (March 2011–2014); Ströer (2014–present)

History
- Launched: 1998 (online); 30 November 1998 (show); 29 September 2005 (channel)
- Closed: 31 March 2006 (show); 31 March 2009 (channel)
- Former names: NBC GIGA (1998–2004); GIGA Green (2005)

Links
- Website: giga.de

GIGA was the brand name of a digital TV channel (also known as GIGA Digital or GIGA TV) and several German television shows. The channel ceased operations in 2009, but the brand itself is still used as a website today.

== History ==
=== Early days ===
The first GIGA show was broadcast on 30 November 1998. The show NBC GIGA was first shown on the television channel NBC Europe. The show ran for five hours, from 3 pm until 8 pm.

=== Broadcasts on own channel ===
In March 2005, the show was renamed from NBC GIGA to GIGA Green, airing on its own digital channel starting in September. Also, in September 2005, the original show was renamed a second time, now to the simple name GIGA, which caused some confusion because the television channel on which it was broadcast was also named GIGA. The show had been shortened from five hours to three hours, Monday through Friday, and was now being broadcast on the television channel GIGA as well as on the television channel Das Vierte ("The Fourth").

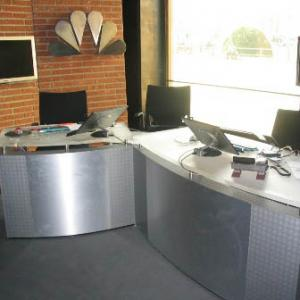
GIGA real studio

Then, in March 2006, the show GIGA – the original NBC GIGA – was cancelled. The most popular shows still running at this point were GIGA\\Games, GIGA eSports, and PLAY.

Beginning on 1 January 2008, GIGA Digital Television GmbH in Cologne was operated by Premiere (now Sky Deutschland).

=== Shutdown ===
On 13 February 2009, the managing director of GIGA, Stephan Borg, announced that Premiere decided to shut down the channel and release all staff. Reasons mentioned included the lack of financial success and bad outlook on the advertising market; in general, Premiere wanted to concentrate on its core channels. Thus, the channel space initially created by NBC Europe's predecessor Super Channel in 1987 subsequently folded and ceased to exist.

The American gaming and entertainment network IGN Entertainment, which is owned by Fox Interactive Media, announced on 20 April 2009 the acquisition of the gaming community site GIGA.de - the online arm of the GIGA television channel. The two companies have shared content since August 2008, and IGN took the opportunity to penetrate the German market. Current plans are to maintain the GIGA.DE trademark and structure.

=== New beginning ===
In September 2011, the ECONA Internet AG, the new owner of GIGA, announced that they want to revive GIGA as a TV show. GIGA will first be available only as Web-TV including the Entertainment and Digital Lifestyle Site GIGA.DE. GIGA will begin broadcasting in October 2011. In 2014, Econa sold the brand to Ströer, which continues to run it with the former founders.
