= Ströer =

German advertising company

Ströer SE & Co. KGaA
- Company type: SE & Co. KGaA
- Traded as: FWB: SAX
- ISIN: DE0007493991
- Industry: Mass media, out-of-home advertising
- Founded: 1990; 36 years ago
- Headquarters: Cologne, Germany
- Key people: Udo Müller (CEO); Chrsitoph Vilanek (CFO); Matthias Dang (chairman of the board)
- Revenue: €1.91 billion (2023)
- Number of employees: 13,000 (2019)
- Website: www.stroeer.com

Ströer SE & Co. KGaA is a German out-of-home advertising, online advertising, billboards and street furniture company with headquarters in Cologne.

Digital large-screen billboard in Dresden

== Markets ==
Ströer SE & Co. KGaA is an outdoor advertising, online advertising, billboards and street furniture company with headquartered in Cologne. Aside from Germany, the company's core markets are Poland, Spain, the Netherlands, Belgium and the United Kingdom. The publicly traded company is listed in the SDAX and the Prime Standard segment of the Frankfurter Börse. In 2019, the revenue was 1.6 billion euro.

== Acquisitions ==
Former logo

In 2014, Ströer acquired the brand GIGA Television, which continues to run it with the former founders.

In November 2015, Ströer acquired T-Online's (Germany's biggest Internet service provider) online portal, and in December 2015, Ströer acquired a 78.8% stake in Statista for €57 million. Ströer acquired the remaining stake in Statista in 2019.

In 2016, Ströer acquired StayFriends from United Online. StayFriends is now officially run by Ströer's T-Online.

== Criticism ==
=== Advertising tobacco to children ===
Ströer has used loopholes in national legislation to advertise for tobacco, specifically targeting young people, despite European laws prohibiting nicotine marketing in public places. In German cities, as of 2019 notably Mainz and Hildesheim, the company has repeatedly placed advertising signs directly in front of schools, Kindergartens and playgrounds.

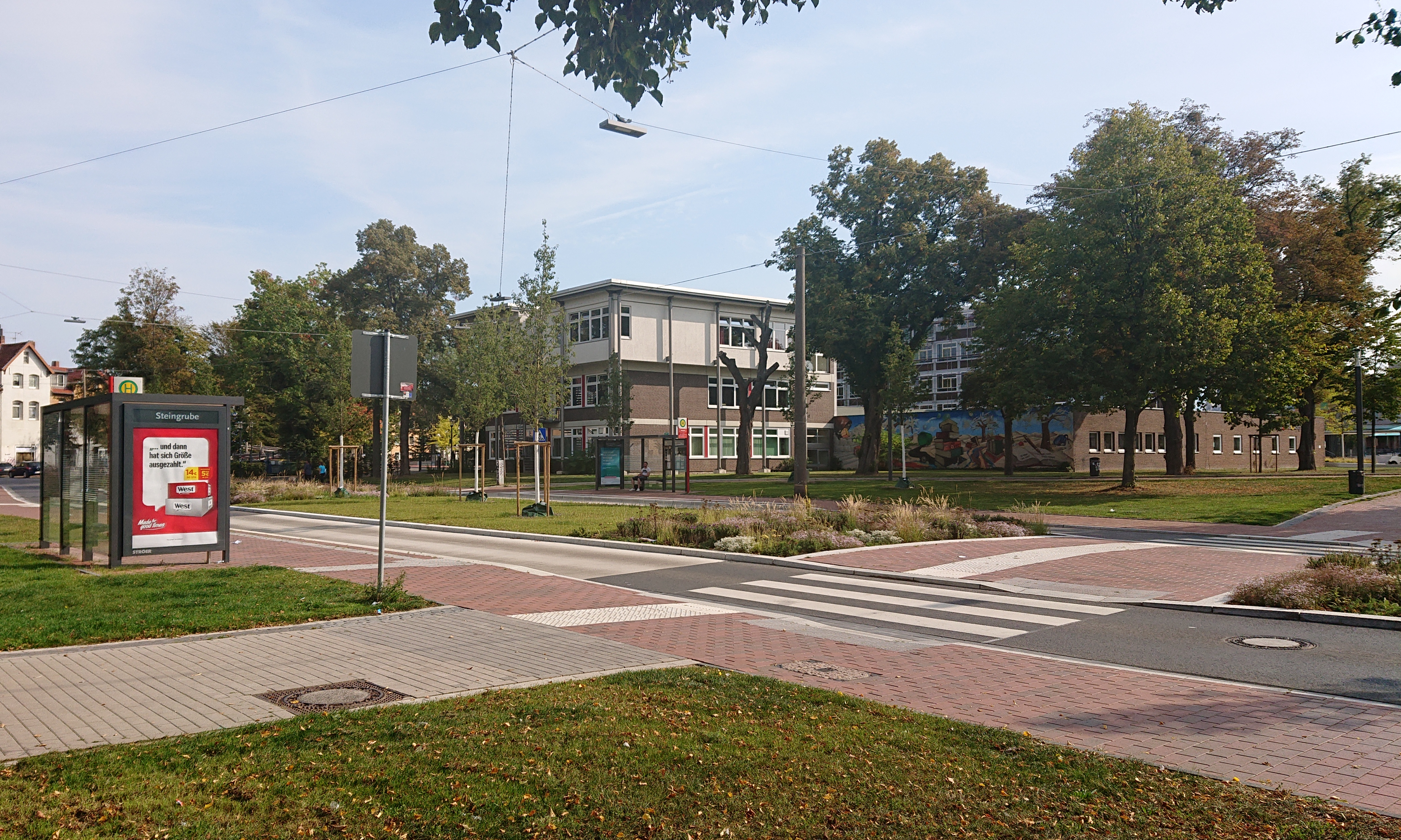
Nicotine marketing provided by Ströer Media in front of a German school in 2020
