= T-Online =

German news portal

- Company type: Subsidiary
- Founded: September 1995; 30 years ago
- Headquarters: Berlin, Germany
- Products: News Portal
- Parent: Ströer
- Website: t-online.de

t-online.de is a German news portal, owned and published by digital multi-channel media company Ströer. It reaches over 179 million visits per month coming from 29 million unique visitors. The editorial team is located in Berlin.

== History ==
Historical t-online logo from 1995 to 25 March 2019

In 1995 Deutsche Telekom renamed the Bildschirmtext (BTX) service as "T-Online". In Spring 2000, T-Online became the first major Internet service provider (ISP) in Germany to offer a flat-rate dialup plan for consumers. This was important because local telephone calls in Germany, including dialup access to ISPs, were not offered on a flat price per call (i.e., unlimited) basis. The flat-rate service was also offered to customers with ISDN connections at the same price as for analog service. In spring 2001, T-Online announced the demise of the flat-rate dialup plan but offered a flat-rate DSL plan in its place.

Deutsche Telekom (T-Online) was the monopoly ISP for the German Internet until its privatization in 1995, and the dominant ISP thereafter. Until the 21st century, Deutsche Telekom controlled almost all Internet access by individuals and small businesses in Germany.

The website t-online.de was taken over by digital multi-channel media company Ströer in 2015. In addition to acquiring a major news site, the synergy enables Ströer to publish T-Online editorial content via a network of public video screens in shopping malls as well as train and subway stations.
