= Hollywood on the Rocks =

American television series

- Starring: Chris Gore
- Country of origin: United States

Production
- Running time: 30 minutes

Original release
- Release: 2009

Hollywood on the Rocks is a television series hosted by Chris Gore, produced by Mini Movie Channel, and distributed by Ovation TV.

Nestle's Nespresso is set to be one of the partnering sponsors.
