= Disney Junior (Germany) =

Defunct television channel in Germany, Austria and Switzerland

- Final logo, used from 2019 to 30 September 2021.
- Country: Germany
- Broadcast area: Germany, Austria, Switzerland
- Headquarters: Lilli-Palmer-Str. 2 80636, Munich, Germany

Programming
- Picture format: 1080i HDTV (downscaled to 16:9 576i for the SDTV feed)

Ownership
- Owner: The Walt Disney Company Limited; Disney Channels Worldwide (Walt Disney Direct-to-Consumer & International)
- Sister channels: Disney Channel; Disney XD (2009–2020)

History
- Launched: 10 November 2004 (as Playhouse Disney); 14 July 2011 (as Disney Junior)
- Closed: 30 September 2021; 5 years ago
- Replaced by: Disney Channel (programming)
- Former names: Playhouse Disney (2004–2011)

Disney Junior was a German pay kids television channel, launched on November 10, 2004, as Playhouse Disney.

== History ==
=== As Playhouse Disney (2004–2011) ===
The channel launched on November 10, 2004, in the pay television offer of Vodafone Kabel Deutschland and via satellite since September 13, 2007 via the pay television package Sky Welt (formerly Premiere Star) and broadcast daily from 6:00 a.m. to 8:00 p.m.. The channel is tailored to preschool children and promote the children's development through play. Five presenters accompanied the children's everyday lives every day; the shows always revolved around a topic such as: B. Animals, plants or human food. There was also cooking and singing. The program was violence-free and commercial-free. In addition to Germany, Playhouse Disney also existed in Great Britain, the US and France. The broadcasting license was applied for by The Walt Disney Company and granted by the Bavarian State Center for New Media in October 2004.

On April 18, 2011, it was announced that Playhouse Disney, now also in Germany, would be replaced by Disney Junior. The changeover, which began in the US at the beginning of February 2011, was completed in Germany on July 14, 2011. From July 7 until the end of the broadcast, a countdown ran that indicated the start of Disney Junior's broadcast. July 14, 2011 was the final full day of Playhouse Disney's broadcast at 6:00 a.m., and at 1:30 p.m., Playhouse Disney was replaced by Disney Junior. The last show broadcast on Playhouse Disney was the Mickey Mouse Clubhouse episode "Space Adventure" at 12:40 p.m.

=== As Disney Junior (2011–2021) ===
This era started at 1:30 p.m. on July 14, 2011 with the premiere of the new Disney Junior series Jake and the Neverland Pirates, followed by the new season of the craft show Art Attack and Lalaloopsy. From 6:00 a.m. to 1:30 p.m. the station ran under the name Playhouse Disney in the same time slot.

Disney Junior HD launched on September 5, 2013, and was available on Vodafone TV Variety HD via cable as well as on Telekom Entertain and Sky in the World Package via satellite. The channel has no longer been broadcast on Sky since April 1, 2020. On September 30, 2021, Disney Junior was discontinued in German-speaking countries, simultaneously with the discontinuation of the Southeast Asian version of this channel. The last program on the channel was an episode of Bluey before going to the channel's daily sign-off song and later redirecting viewers to Disney Channel.

== Logos ==
2004–2011

2019–2021
