= Sascha Williams =

British journalist and newsreader

Sascha Williams (born 14 May 1980 in Chelmsford, Essex) is a British journalist and newsreader employed by ITV News.

Sascha started her broadcasting career at ITV Anglia, working on ITV News Anglia as a production journalist from June 2003 until January 2006, when she was promoted to on-screen reporter and presenter.

In December 2009, she became freelance, reporting for Daybreak, ITV News, ITV News London and NBC News. She was also a newscaster of the national ITV News at 5:30 and newsreader for ITV News London.

In July 2013 she was contracted to ITV News as a journalist and newsreader.
