= Disney Channel (Germany) =

German television channel

- Final logo, used from 1 February 2023 to 1 December 2026
- Country: Germany
- Broadcast area: Germany; Austria; Switzerland
- Headquarters: Munich, Germany

Programming
- Languages: German (dubbing); English (via Disney+)
- Picture format: HDTV 1080i; SDTV 576i (downscaled)

Ownership
- Owner: The Walt Disney Company (Germany) GmbH
- Sister channels: Disney Junior (2004–2021); Disney XD (2009–2020); National Geographic; Nat Geo Wild

History
- Launched: 16 October 1999; 27 years ago (pay TV); 17 January 2014; 12 years ago (free TV)
- Replaced: Das Vierte (relaunch)
- Closed: 30 November 2013; 12 years ago (pay TV); 1 December 2026; 8 days' time (free TV)
- Replaced by: Disney TV

Links
- Website: https://tv.disney.de

Availability

Terrestrial
- Digital terrestrial television (Germany): Various; region dependent (HD / encrypted)

Streaming media
- Disney+

Disney Channel is a soon-to-be-defunct German free-to-air television channel owned by The Walt Disney Company Germany. The channel is based in Munich and is targeted towards children during the daytime; during primetime, programmes are intended for families and adults.

Aimed at all ages, its programming consists of original first-run television series, theatrically released and original made-for-cable movies and select other third-party programming. The original programming is mainly supplied by its American counterpart.

The channel was originally launched on 16 October 1999 as a subscription television channel on the Sky Deutschland platform. However, it was later closed down on 30 November 2013. It was transformed into a free-TV channel on 17 January 2014, replacing Das Vierte.

The network competes with other channels primarily aimed at children, such as Super RTL (50% owned by Disney Television until March 2021), KiKa and Nickelodeon Germany.

== History ==
Walt Disney Television International opened their German offices near Munich on 1 March 1999. Disney Channel Germany was launched on 16 October 1999 as a subscription channel.

Disney purchased Das Vierte (lit. The Fourth), a free-to-air TV station, in December 2012 from Dmitry Lesnevsky, a Russian media mogul, and former owner of Russia's REN-TV. In April 2013, Disney announced that Das Vierte would become Disney Channel in January 2014 as a 24-hour family entertainment network under Disney Channel's German head Lars Wagner.

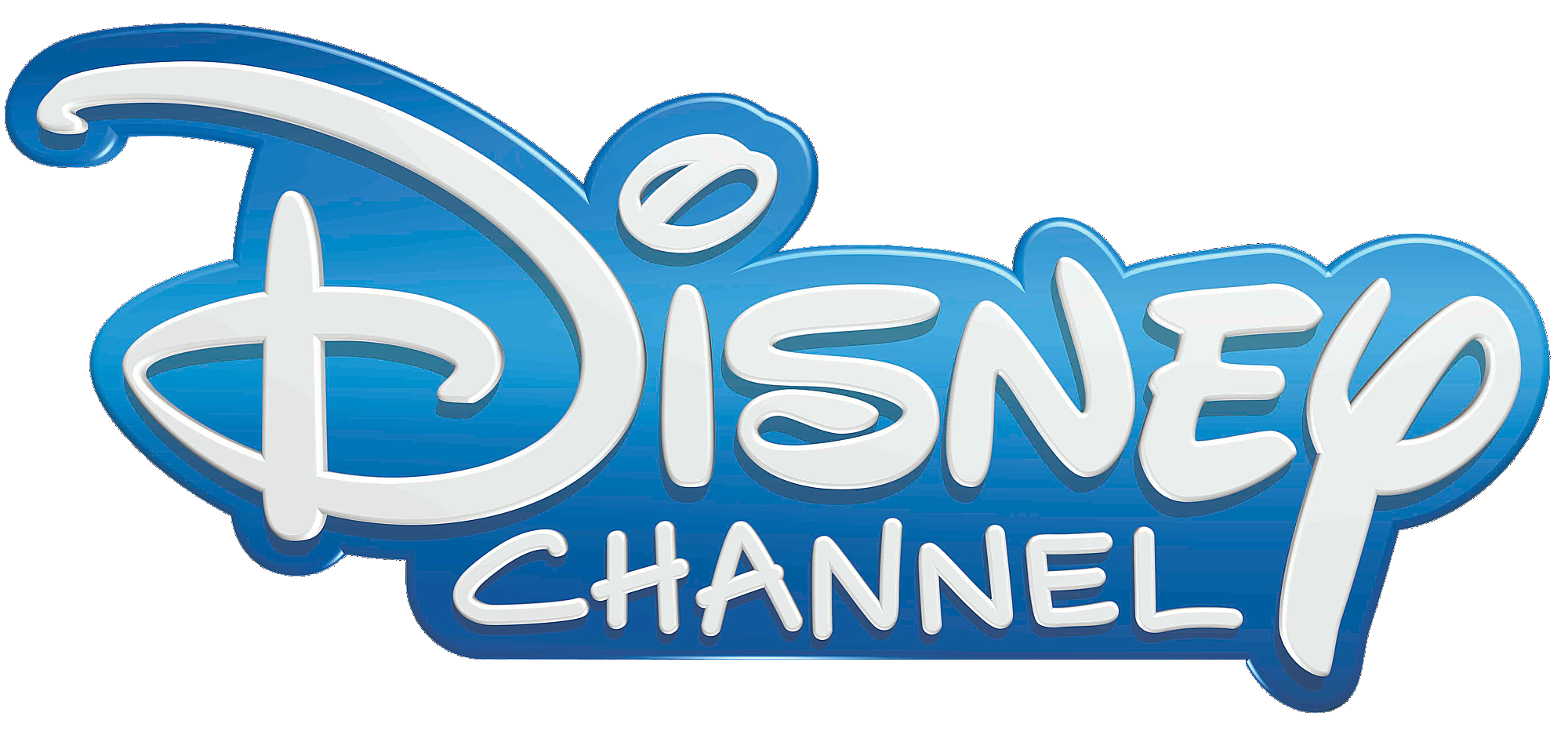
Evening Logo, used from 20:15 (Primetime) daily, it was used until 1 February 2024.

Initial daytime programming included standard Disney Channel fare including Jessie, Austin & Ally, Phineas and Ferb and Gravity Falls while prime time saw Pixar films and older drawing shows including those from ABC Family as well as Hallmark Channel's Cedar Cove. Disney formed an in-house ad sales company, Disney Media+, for the channel given that two competitors control most ad sales companies. The channel will also be offered on two online platforms: live-stream and a catch-up service. The channel suspended transmission on 30 November 2013 and launched over the air on 17 January 2014 at 6 AM with the classic animated short film Steamboat Willie. Disney reported that its launch weekend pushed them past Nick in to third place among kid broadcast channels.

On April 20, 2026, it was announced that a livestream of Disney Channel would be added to Disney+ at no additional cost in May.

On 2 July 2026, it was announced that Disney Channel would be rebranded to Disney TV by the end of the year, with the aim of keep only one generalist linear free-to-air TV channel in the country, instead of owning linear pay TV channels. This is because, in the German market, free-to-air TV channels are viewed more than pay TV channels. In 26 August, the rebrand was clarified to be taking place on 1 December.

== Disney TV ==
Disney TV
- Country: Germany
- Broadcast area: Germany; Austria; Switzerland; Liechtenstein; Luxembourg; Schleswig-Holstein; Mecklenburg-Vorpommern; Saarland; Lower Saxony; Hesse; South Tyrol
- Headquarters: Munich, Germany

Programming
- Languages: German (dubbing); English (via Disney+)
- Picture format: HDTV 1080i

Ownership
- Owner: The Walt Disney Company (Germany) GmbH

History
- Launched: 1 December 2026; 8 days' time
- Replaced: Disney Channel

Disney TV is an upcoming television channel in the German-speaking countries like Germany, Austria, Switzerland, Liechtenstein, Luxembourg, Schleswig-Holstein, Mecklenburg-Vorpommern, Saarland, Lower Saxony, Hesse and South Tyrol, that is broadcast by the Disney Entertainment Television division of The Walt Disney Company. It is a rebrand of Disney Channel in the German-speaking countries and is set to launch on 1 December 2026.

=== Programming ===
Disney TV consists of content from Disney-owned networks including ABC, Disney Channel, Freeform and FX Networks. Unlike its previous incarnation of Disney Channel in the German-speaking countries, the network's programing is broadcast for general and mature audiences, and includes originals from Disney+ and Hulu.

== Availability ==
Via the airwaves, the station had an availability to 93% of German TV households plus on two online platforms: live-stream and a catch-up service, as well as Europe wide on Astra digital satellite service.

== Logos ==
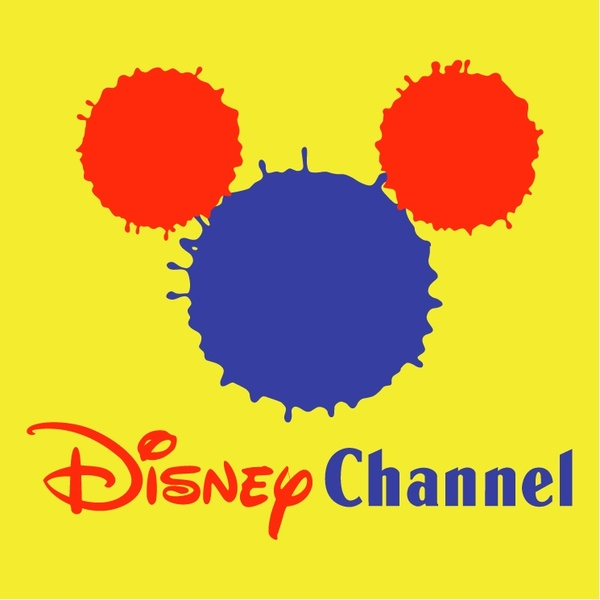
1999–2002

2002–2011

2011–2013

2014–2017

2017–2023

2023–2026

== See also ==
- Super RTL
