= Videomusic =

Defunct Italian music television channel

- Country: Italy

Programming
- Language: Italian

History
- Launched: April 2, 1984
- Closed: June 1, 1996

Videomusic was an Italian music channel and one of the first music channels in Europe. It was launched in early 1984 and was owned by Marialina Marcucci and Pier Luigi Stefani (VM's Managing Director). It used to air from a location called "Il Ciocco", near Castelvecchio Pascoli, a frazione of Barga in the province of Lucca (Tuscany). A second studio was later opened in Corso Monforte in Milan with the scope of spreading its terrestrial signal to most of the Italian regions. The first music video transmitted was Lionel Richie's "All Night Long". During the first four years of its existence, the Videomusic brand became popular among young people. The first four VJs were Rick Hutton, Clive Griffiths, Johnny Parker and Tiziana Cappetti. In 1985 they were joined by Claudio De Tommasi.

In 1988, Videomusic's owners bought 90% of pan-European TV channel Super Channel, while the remaining 10% was taken over by Virgin. Between 1989 and 1990, Videomusic also produced some English language music shows for Super Channel. Most of these shows were produced in Italy and were considered amateurish by European viewers who were used to watching high-quality music shows from Music Box, a separate company which also broadcast on Super Channel until the end of 1989.

In September 1993, the Marcucci family sold Super Channel to the US's NBC, which rebranded it as NBC Super Channel. At the same time, logo and graphic set of Videomusic were changed to a new one due to its similarities with the MTV logo.

In 1994 Videomusic was sold to Film producer Vittorio Cecchi Gori, who at the time owned another TV station, Telemontecarlo. In 1996 Videomusic was rebranded as TMC2 (Tele Monte Carlo 2) and its schedules changed to include broader subjects such as sport, news and films. However, the channel also retained music as its most important content as well as the use of the Videomusic logo during music programmes.

In 1997, the Videomusic logo disappeared, but music programmes were increased more. The intention of rebranding the channel again as Videomusic failed when Cecchi Gori sold it to Telecom Italia Media, a Telecom Italia affiliate. The station was later permanently closed down and the Italian speaking MTV purchased its assets and frequencies.
