= Carole Stone =

British writer (born 1942)

Carole Stone CBE
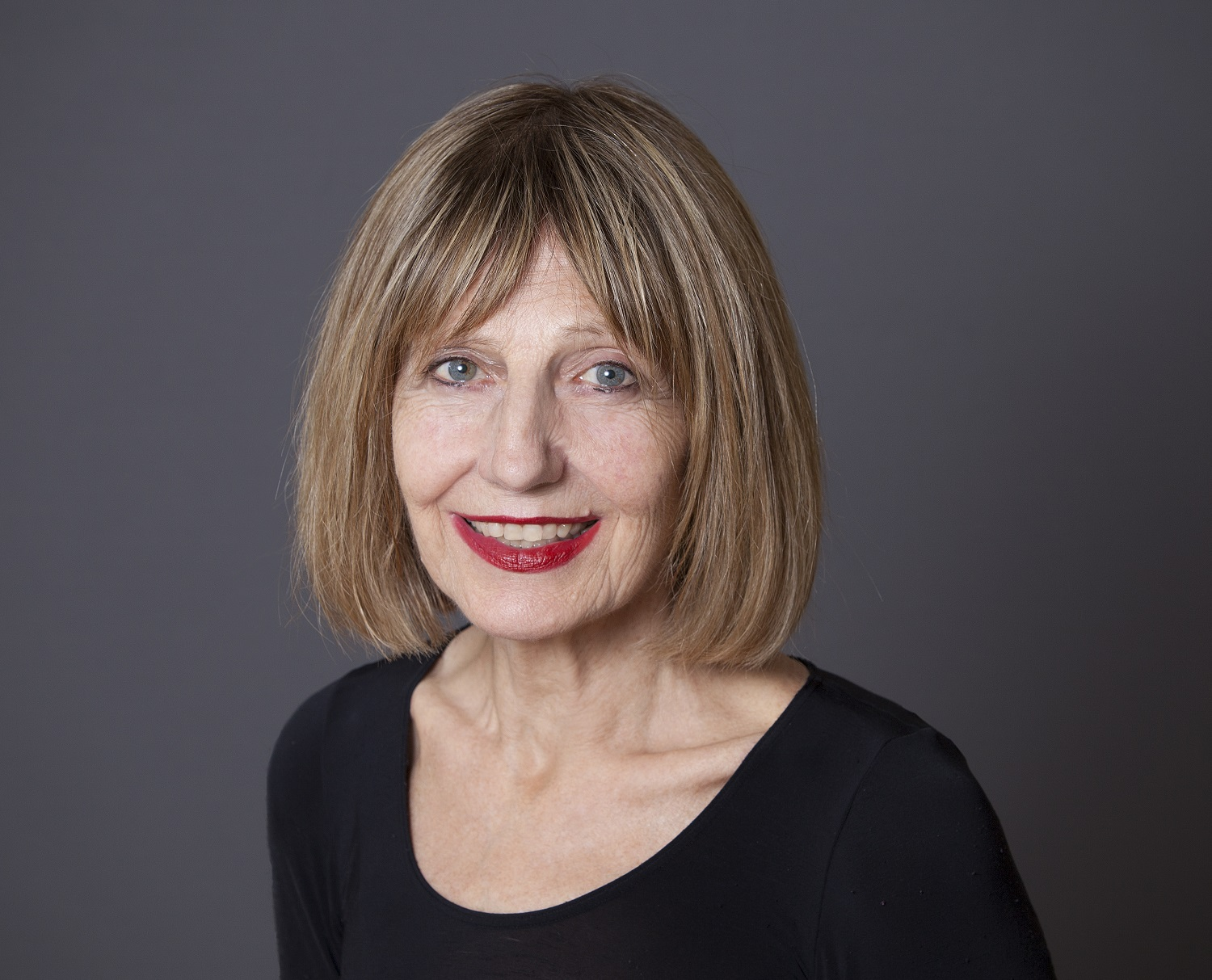
- Born: 30 May 1942 (age 84)
- Occupations: Author and broadcaster
- Spouse: Richard Lindley (m. 1999; death 2019)

Carole Stone, CBE (born 30 May 1942) is a British author and freelance radio and television broadcaster. Stone spent 27 years at the BBC beginning as a newsroom secretary and eventually becoming the producer of Radio 4's flagship discussion programme Any Questions? In 2018, Stone established The Carole Stone Foundation to support her belief that connecting people, exchanging ideas and building friendships around the world is essential to help make a fairer society.

== Career ==
=== BBC ===
Stone spent 27 years at the BBC starting as a newsroom secretary, and went on to become producer of Radio 4's flagship discussion programme Any Questions? between 1977 and 1990.

=== YouGovStone ===
In April 2007, Stone became managing director of YouGovStone, a joint venture with online opinion polling organisation YouGov. She established the YouGovStone Think Tank, a global panel of 4,000 industry leaders and "influentials" used for opinion research and drawn from her database of more than 50,000 people.

== Current activities ==
=== The Carole Stone Foundation ===
Stone established The Carole Stone Foundation in 2018 to support her belief that connecting people, exchanging ideas and building friendships around the world is essential to help make a fairer society. The Carole Stone Foundation awarded its first One Young World Scholarships in 2018.

=== YouGov-Cambridge Centre ===
Stone is the former Chair of the External Advisory Board of the YouGov-Cambridge Centre, a joint centre for polling research at Cambridge University, run byYouGov and the Cambridge POLIS Department.

=== One Young World ===
Stone is a counsellor for the UK-based charity One Young World, that gathers together the brightest young leaders from around the world, enabling them to make lasting connections to create positive change. She has set up her own scholarship within the charity.

=== The Hippocratic Post ===
Stone is a founding director of the recently launched website The Hippocratic Post, the first global blogging site for medics and other health professionals.

=== Tutu Foundation UK ===
Stone is Chairman of the Ambassadors of the Tutu Foundation UK.

=== Centre for Peaceful Solutions ===
Stone is Patron of the Centre for Peaceful Solutions, which works to change our attitudes to conflict and better manage the disputes in our lives to improve our communities, families and workplaces.

=== The Global Foundation to Eliminate Domestic Violence (EDV) ===
In 2016 Stone was elected to succeed Baroness Scotland (who has now become the Secretary-General of the Commonwealth) as Patron of The Global Foundation to Eliminate Domestic Violence (EDV).

== Other associations ==
=== Tavistock and Portman NHS Foundation Trust ===
Stone is a former elected Governor of the Tavistock and Portman NHS Foundation Trust.

=== SANE ===
Stone is Vice-Patron of mental health charity SANE.

=== Saving Faces ===
Stone is Patron of Saving Faces, a facial surgery research foundation.

=== TOP UK The OCD and Phobia Charity ===
Stone is a Patron of TOP UK, the OCD and phobia charity.

== Publications ==
Stone is the author of Networking: The Art of Making Friends (ISBN 0-09-185711-2) and The Ultimate Guide to Successful Networking (ISBN 0-09-190025-5).

== Personal life ==
Stone married television journalist Richard Lindley in 1999; he died in early November 2019.

== Honours and awards ==
In November 2011, Stone was awarded "Britain's Best Connected Woman" by the Institute of Directors and O2.

In June 2014, Stone was made a Senior Fellow of the Regent's University London.

In June 2015, Stone was appointed CBE, for her services to market research and charities.
