= Richard Lindley (journalist) =

British journalist (1936–2019)

Richard Lindley MBE
- Lindley in 2011
- Born: Richard Howard Charles Lindley; 25 April 1936; Winchester, Hampshire, England
- Died: 6 November 2019 (aged 83); London, England
- Education: Bedford School; Queens' College, Cambridge at the University of Cambridge
- Occupation: Television journalist
- Spouse(s): Clare Fehrsen (1976–1986); Carole Stone (1999–2019)
- Children: 2

Richard Lindley MBE (25 April 1936 – 6 November 2019) was a British television journalist. As a foreign correspondent, he was noted for reporting from war zones for the BBC's Panorama and for ITV.

== Biography ==
Lindley was born in Winchester, Hampshire, England, on 25 April 1936. He was educated at Bedford School and studied English Literature at Queens' College, Cambridge, where he was chair of the film society.

Lindley's television career began in 1962. He joined ITN, working as a war reporter in Africa, Asia and in the Middle East. In 1973, he moved from news to current affairs, joining the BBC's flagship Panorama programme. He remained with Panorama for 15 years, before being appointed as a television regulator at the Independent Broadcasting Authority, forerunner of Ofcom, regulating the accuracy and impartiality of ITV news and current affairs.

Returning to programme-making, he became a reporter and presenter for ITV's This Week. He subsequently rejoined ITN to present its World News and make special reports for News at Ten.

He published two books about the history of British broadcasting: one on BBC Panorama and another on the News from ITN.

In 2008, he was elected to the council of the Royal Free Hospital, for which he was latterly lead governor, and other charitable work included chairing the Voice of the Listener & Viewer and also the St Pancras Almshouses, a sheltered accommodation charity.

He was appointed MBE in the 2017 Birthday Honours for voluntary and charitable services.

Lindley's first marriage in 1976 to Clare Fehrsen, with whom he had two children, ended in divorce after ten years. In 1999, he married the broadcaster Carole Stone.

Lindley died at home in London on 6 November 2019 of heart disease, a month after having been run over by a lorry when crossing the road and suffering multiple injuries. He had lived with early-onset Alzheimer's disease in his final three years.
