= NBC Europe =

Former pan-European cable and satellite television network (1987–2005)

NBC Channel
- Final logo, used from 1996 to 2005 in Germany, and from 1996 to 1998 in the rest of Europe
- Country: Europe
- Broadcast area: United Kingdom

Programming
- Picture format: 576i (4:3 SDTV)

Ownership
- Owner: ITV companies/Virgin Group (1987–1988); Marcucci family/Virgin Group (1988–1993); General Electric (1993–2004); NBCUniversal (2004–2005); Deutsche Fernsehnachrichten Agentur (1998–2004)
- Sister channels: CNBC Europe

History
- Launched: 30 January 1987; 39 years ago
- Replaced: Music Box
- Closed: 30 June 1998; 28 years ago (Europe); 29 September 2005; 21 years ago (Germany)
- Replaced by: GIGA (Germany); Das Vierte (Germany); National Geographic Channel (Europe)
- Former names: Super Channel (1987–1993); NBC Super Channel (1993–1996)

NBC Europe (formerly Super Channel, and later NBC Channel) was a satellite television network based in the United Kingdom that broadcast across Europe, and it was picked up by various European cable systems where available.

The network was based in the heart of London, 19-22 Rathbone Place in the same building as Music Box, would later become the home of CNN International until 2007. For a number of months, the transmission facilities were provided by Molinare at Fouberts Place, and returned briefly until the Marcucci family acquired Melrose House, 14 Lanark Square in Limeharbour where it set up as a state-of-the-art broadcasting centre.

== History ==
=== 1987–1993: Super Channel ===
Super Channel logo (1987–1993)

Launched on 30 January 1987, replacing the 24-hour music channel Music Box, it was co-owned by all but two of the ITV companies at the time in the United Kingdom. Virgin Group had a majority stake in Music Box (60%) and would own 15% of the equity with the rest being split between ITV franchise holders including Granada, Yorkshire, LWT, Central, Anglia, Tyne Tees, Ulster, Grampian, Scottish, Border, HTV, TSW and TVS, while Thames and TV-am were the only two of the contractors not to participate. It competed with Sky Channel (forerunner of Sky One), which was the only other major pan-European satellite television network around at the time. Unlike Sky Channel, syndicated output was less American and more European. Much of its programming was sourced from ITV or the BBC as part of "Best of British", and it also featured ITN-produced news bulletins. It also broadcast syndicated non-British European programmes, including the Dutch sitcom Zeg 'ns Aaa (broadcast on the original station VARA, with English subtitles).

Super Channel fared poorly, due to United Kingdom-based programming seen as unsuitable for European audiences, such as drama being seen as "too violent" or "too realistic", as well as a dispute with the British actors' union who demanded additional fees for viewing by audiences which meant that it could no longer offer the 'Best of British to a European audience'.

Within a year, the ITV companies (now including only Granada, TVS, Yorkshire Television, and Anglia Television) sold the network to the Italian Marcucci family, owners of Videomusic, the first music channel in Italy, with a minority stake being held by Richard Branson's Virgin plc. The programming changed from British to pan-European, although it continued carrying ITN World News bulletins.

=== 1993–1998: NBC steps in ===
NBC Super Channel logo (1993–1996)

On 2 October 1993, the station which was in severe financial difficulties was taken over by the American company General Electric, then-owner of the NBC television network, and became NBC Super Channel. From 9 September 1996, the channel was renamed NBC Europe, but was from then on almost always referred to as simply "NBC" on the air, although the network (along with its sister station CNBC Europe launched on 11 March earlier that year) was transmitted from the GE building in Hammersmith. The transmission suite used cutting edge Pro-Bel COMPASS and MAPP automation at the time, and Profile video servers for all commercials and promotions, within programmes continued to be played from tape automatically.

Most of NBC's prime time programming was produced in Europe, but after 10.00pm (CET) on weekday evenings as the channel aired The Tonight Show with Jay Leno, Late Night with Conan O'Brien and Later to hence its slogan "Where the Stars Come Out at Night". Most news programmes were broadcast on NBC Europe including Dateline, Time and Again and NBC Nightly News, which was aired live. The Today Show was also initially shown live in the afternoons, but was later broadcast the following morning instead, by which time it was more than half a day old. This meant that all the NBC News portions had to be replaced with European updates produced by ITN in London, who also supplied the network with the main newscasts before and after the GE takeover. European weather forecasts was produced by the BBC at first, but was later taken over by NBC in the United States occasionally.

NBC Europe carried virtually no prime time entertainment programmes shown in the United States, because they were usually owned and distributed by other studios under the fin-syn rules (which did not apply in Europe). NBC would have had to buy the rights for each country in order to show which would have been too expensive. Even for shows that NBC Studios owned itself, it was generally more financially viable to sell the rights by country either to broadcast or cable and satellite channels than to air them on NBC Europe. The most notable exceptions to this rule were brief runs of Profiler and The Pretender, as well as short-lived American sitcoms Union Square and Mr. Rhodes. That is widely considered to be one of the main reasons why NBC Europe was ultimately not a success.

=== 1998–2005: As a German network ===
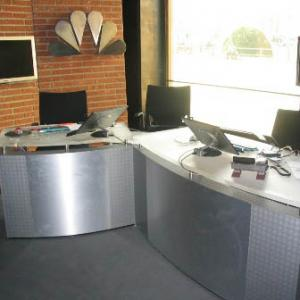
Studio of news programme "GIGA Real"

NBC Europe stopped broadcasting to most of Europe on 30 June 1998, when the Deutsche Fernsehnachrichten Agentur took it over and moved to Düsseldorf. Most of the satellite feeds became either National Geographic Channel or CNBC. NBC Europe continued to operate on Germany's cable television networks, fed by one digital satellite link from Eutelsat II-F1 (later Hot Bird 5). On 30 November, the first German programming started airing, assembled from content from GIGA and CNBC Europe, as well as other shows. In 2004, NBC Universal took over the DFA and consequently NBC Europe.

On 29 September 2005, NBC Europe was split into GIGA and later replaced by the new channel Das Vierte. The service continued broadcasting with its licence on cable, satellite, IPTV and digital cable. It broadcast a special version on cable television including CNBC Europe and GIGA (up until 31 March 2006). This was necessary to keep both the licence and the cable channel.

On 25 September 2012, The Walt Disney Company acquired Das Vierte and closed the service from 31 December 2013. On 17 January 2014, the network was replaced by Disney Channel Germany switching from pay television to free-to-air.

== Programming ==
Due to limitations on the amount of entertainment shows on the network, NBC Europe (including GIGA) aired a number of original programming in tandem with American content that had not been aired in Europe beforehand. These include:

- 49win
- Agenda
- Best of the Ticket
- Blue Night
- Bonanza
- Business Insiders
- Business Tonight
- Business Weekly
- Chinese News Europe
- CNBC Business Weekly
- CNBC European Squawk Box
- CNBC U.S. Squawk Box
- Dateline
- Daybreak
- The Detectives
- Disaster Chronicles
- Eco Record
- Equal Time
- European Business Today
- Father Murphy
- Film Europe
- FT Business Today
- FT Business Tonight
- FT European Business Today
- GIGA green (later GIGA@ the gate)
- GIGA Games
- GIGA Heartbeat
- Gillette World Sport Special
- Holidays
- Hotline
- Inside Edition
- ITN Super Channel News
- ITN World News
- Kinowelt-De News
- Late Night with Conan O'Brien
- Later
- Major League Baseball
- Mancuso, F.B.I.
- Max's European Home Video Show
- MediaTelevision
- The Mix
- Money Wheel
- European Money Wheel
- U.S. Money Wheel
- Mr. Rhodes
- MSNBC Internight Live
- National Geographic
- NBC GIGA
- NBC GIGA Real
- NBC Music Legends
- NBC News Special Reports
- NBC News Today
- NBC Nightly News
- NBC Sports News
- NHL International Weekly
- On the Air
- Personal
- PGA Tour
- The Pretender
- Profiler
- Real Personal
- Riviera
- The Rolonda Watts Show
- Saturday Night Live
- The Selina Scott Show
- The Site
- SMS Challenge
- Super Channel Documentaries
- Super Channel Sports Specials
- Super Shop
- Talkin' Blues
- Talkin' Jazz
- This Week In Baseball
- Time and Again
- The Today Show
- Today's Business
- The Tonight Show with Jay Leno
- Travel Express
- U.S. Market Wrap Up
- Union Square
- Victory
- Videofashion
- West of Moscow
- Young Soul Rebels

== See also ==
- List of European television stations
- Timeline of cable television in the United Kingdom
- Europa TV
