= StayFriends.de =

German social networking service

StayFriends GmbH
- Company type: Private (GmbH)
- Website type: Social networking
- Available in: German
- Founded: Erlangen, Germany (2002)
- Headquarters: Erlangen, Germany
- Key people: Michel Lindenberg, CEO and co-founder
- Employees: 100 (February 2014)
- Website: StayFriends.de
- Advertising: Banner ads
- Registration: Required
- Launched: 2002
- Current status: Active

Stayfriends.de is a social network service created in 2002. The social media website helps members find, connect and keep in touch with friends from kindergarten, primary school, high school in Germany. Stayfriends.de has more than 14 million members in Germany (in 2014). Since 2004, Stayfriends belonged to Classmates.com, since 2016 it has belonged to the Cologne-based Ströer group.

According to AGOF, Stayfriends.de is the 50th most visited website in Germany with 3.89 million unique monthly visitors (December 2013).

== Organization ==
Based in Berlin, StayFriends GmbH has operated the online platform StayFriends.de since August 2002. From January 2004 to May 2016, StayFriends GmbH was a wholly owned subsidiary of Classmates Online (Renton, Washington), the operator of the online community Classmates.com, which is a subsidiary of the U.S. internet company United Online. The CEO is the founder of the site, Michel Lindenberg. In 2016, StayFriends was acquired by the Ströer group.

== How it works ==
StayFriends enables its members to find their old friends from school. Schools can be searched by state (Land) and city. A user can add all the schools he attended on his profile by giving the start and end year of each of them.

Users can perform searches on the database by last name, first name, city, and school. Searches of last names can be done using the last name used at school and the current last name.

While some functions are free, such as searching for old friends, organizing class reunions, or viewing of class photos, others require gold membership. These premium features include the ability to read messages received and display all the photos and profile information. Communication without restriction is possible only if the sender or the receiver is a gold member; users can contact each other only if one of them has paid for the service.

== Privacy ==
StayFriends requires users to register with their real first and last names. An online mailbox service makes it possible to send and receive messages on the website without disclosing one's e-mail address. A newsletter is sent every two months by e-mail.
