= Statista =

German Internet company (founded 2007)

Statista GmbH

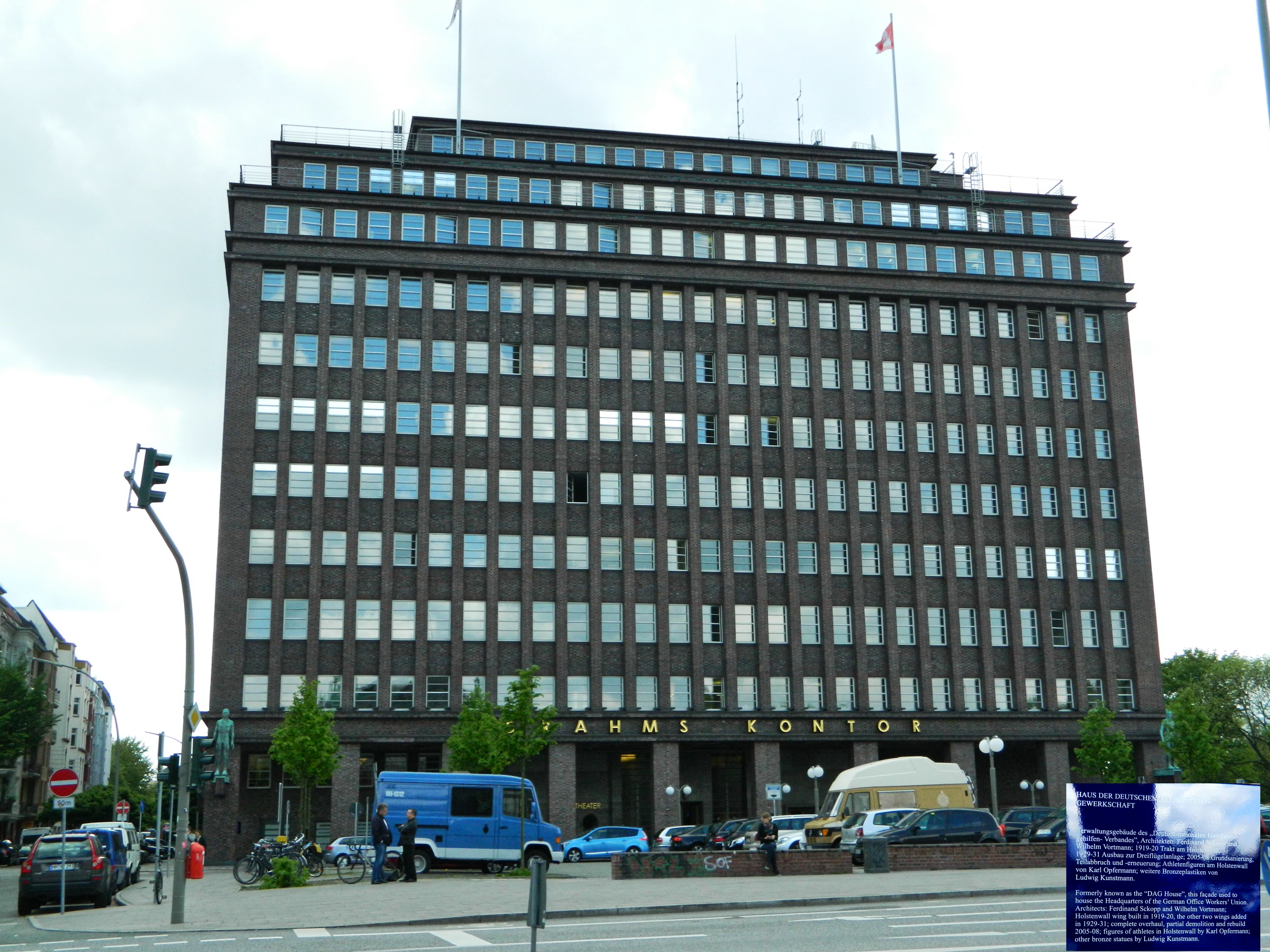
- Headquarters in Hamburg
- Company type: Subsidiary
- Industry: Database
- Founded: Hamburg, Germany (2007; 19 years ago)
- Headquarters: Hamburg
- Key people: Marc Berg (CEO)
- Number of employees: 1,450 as of 2025
- Parent: Ströer
- Website: www.statista.com

Statista (styled in all lower case) is a German online platform that specializes in data gathering and visualization. In addition to publicly available third-party data, Statista also provides exclusive data via the platform, which is collected through its team's surveys and analysis.

According to its own publications, Statista offers more than 1,000,000 statistics on over 80,000 topics from more than 22,500 sources in over 150 countries and is accessed 31 million times a month (as of December 2022). The company claims to cover around 170 industries with its content. In 2024, Statista reported more than four million registered users, with which the company generated around 167 million euros in revenue. Statista has been owned by Ströer Media since 2015, with an 81.3% stake.

The company provides statistics and survey results, which are presented in charts and tables. Its main target groups are business customers, lecturers, and researchers. The data provided by the company covers, among other things, advertisements, buying behavior, or specific industries. In addition, the company offers reports on advertising, purchasing behavior, politics and society, and data on individual sectors of the economy and countries.

In 2010, the initiative "Deutschland – Land der Ideen" ("Germany – Land of Ideas") selected Statista as one of the winners in the category "Landmarks in the Land of Ideas 2010" and awarded the "European Red Herring Prize."

In 2020, Statista announced plans to offer subscriptions to a database of companies. According to its own information, the portal's data partners include the Federal Statistical Office, the Allensbach Institute for Public Opinion Research, the OECD and the German Institute for Economic Research. Other partners include the Financial Times and Fortune.

== Transition to English-only content ==
In November 2025, Statista announced the closure of its French-language platform. The company stated it was "consolidating [its] content into a single language – English" and noted that its "reliable French-language content is now available in English on the global statista.com platform" as part of an effort to "optimize quality and user experience." Statista added that French-language content would be archived, and French-speaking users were encouraged to use the global .com platform, supplemented by the Research AI tool that allows queries in French.
