= ITN World News =

- Presented by: Various
- Countries of origin: United Kingdom; Australia; United States; Pan-European Nations; Malta

Production
- Producer: ITN
- Running time: 30 minutes

Original release
- Network: NBC Europe; ITV Network; TVM Malta; Nine Network; PBS Television

ITN World News is a news programme broadcast during the late 1980s and most of the 1990s. It was either shown on cable or satellite television, or shown internationally. The newscast was broadcast from London, England, and was produced by Independent Television News. A domestic national version was also shown in the United Kingdom on terrestrial television.

ITN World News began broadcasting on Super Channel, and aired on NBC Europe, Nine Network Australia, TVNZ, Public Broadcasting Service (PBS) stations and most of the ITV regions. The broadcast began in 1987, and has not been seen on British screens since 1999. The newscast was produced by ITN and broadcast from its studios in London.

== Domestic versions ==
=== Super Channel ===
ITN World News began life as ITN Super Channel News, a newscast for the then-newly formed pan-European satellite channel, Super Channel. The newscast began broadcasting in 1987, and its main broadcast was shown live at 21.00 GMT (22.00 CET). Its main presenters were John Suchet, Sue Carpenter, and David Cass. Trevor McDonald and Edward Stourton were later newscasters for the programme.

=== ITV Network ===
In 1988, ITN began producing an hour-long newscast called ITN Morning News, broadcast from London at 05.00 GMT and preceding TV-am's Good Morning Britain. It was shown on the stations of the ITV network. Part of this newscast, about half-way through the programme, included a domestic version of Super Channel News entitled ITN World News. It featured the same presenters as the version shown on Super Channel. Trevor McDonald later presented the programme before going on to become chief newscaster on News at Ten. Edward Stourton also presented occasionally. After the Gulf War, ITN World News was no longer shown as part of the morning newscast, and the newscast itself was halved and broadcast at 05.30 GMT, where it resided until December 2012 when the bulletin was axed (albeit as ITV Morning News until 2009, then the ITV News at 5:30).

=== NBC Europe ===
In 1993, Super Channel was bought by General Electric, an American company which at the time owned NBC in the United States. Initially, Super Channel was renamed NBC Super Channel. Many popular NBC programmes began appearing on the channel: they included programmes like The Tonight Show with Jay Leno, Late Night with Conan O'Brien, Saturday Night Live; and Dateline NBC, The Today Show, and NBC Nightly News With Tom Brokaw. Business and financial news was provided by CNBC and The Financial Times. The channel's own news programme ITN Super Channel News was renamed ITN World News. With the exception of Nightly News, NBC News programmes on the channel were not broadcast live; ITN provided live inserts with the latest headlines. ITN World News expanded to an hour, still in its timeslot of 21.00 GMT (22.00 CET). In 1996, NBC Super Channel became NBC Europe. In 1998 NBC Europe ceased broadcasting. ITN World News ceased broadcasting in the United Kingdom on the day of the channel's final broadcast. During the end of its run on NBC Europe, the programme's main presenters were Richard Lindley and Selina Scott. Towards its final years, its presenters were Katy Haswell and Richard Bath.

== International versions ==
=== ITN World News For Public Television ===
From 1992 to 1998, ITN made a deal with WLIW to bring ITN World News to public television stations across the United States.

In 1998, ITN made a deal with WNET, the PBS member station for New York City, for a newer version of the newscast to be broadcast from London for public television stations in the United States (it was never, however, part of the national PBS schedule, being distributed by American Program Service). It made its debut on 2 November, with a new set, new music, and a new presenter, Daljit Dhaliwal. The name of the new incarnation of the broadcast was ITN World News For Public Television. Although it made Daljit Dhaliwal a household name in the United States, the broadcast was cancelled again at the end of 2001, due to a lack of funding.

WNET later attempted to produce its own internationally focused newscast, Worldfocus, which at one point also had Dhaliwal as an anchor – but it too was short-lived, airing from fall 2008 to early 2010. In both cases, stations generally replaced the cancelled programs with simulcasts of BBC World News.

=== Nine Network ===
From the late 1980s until the mid 90s, ITN World News was broadcast on some stations of the Nine Network. It aired on TCN-9 Sydney, NWS-9 Adelaide, STW-9 Perth, TVT-6 Television Tasmania (later WIN Television Tasmania), WIN-31 WIN Television Canberra and RTQ-31 WIN Television Rockhampton. It was usually broadcast at either 06.00 or 06.30 AET. The World News was replaced with, variously, an edition of CNN World News or by national newscasts from Nine.

=== TVNZ ===
From October 1990 until early 1995, ITN World News was broadcast on TVNZ's Channel 2 and, later, TV One. It was usually broadcast at 07.00 NZT with a same-day repeat at 08.00 NZT during the winter months, and at 08.00 NZT during the summer months. The World News was replaced with a direct satellite feed of BBC World.

=== TVM Malta ===
In the late 1980s and early 1990s, ITN World News aired across Malta on the Maltese national television channel, TVM Malta, with an introduction in Maltese by the local newsreader.

== Presenters ==
- John Suchet – Original Presenter, 1987–93
- Sue Carpenter – Regular Presenter, 1987–93
- Trevor McDonald – Regular Presenter, 1990–92
- Edward Stourton – 1987–92
- Richard Lindley – Regular Presenter, 1993–98
- Selina Scott – Regular Presenter, 1995–97
- Daljit Dhaliwal – United States Presenter, 1995–99; Regular Presenter, 1998–99
- Carol Barnes – Special Presenter [Gulf War Coverage], 1991
- Julia Somerville – Special Presenter [Gulf War Coverage], 1991
- Fiona Armstrong – 1990–92
- Penny Marshall – Business Presenter, 1987–94
- Graham Miller – Sports Presenter, 1993–99
- Amanda Alexander – Composer, 1987-1993
- Dave Hewson – Composer, 1993–2001

== See also ==
- BBC World News
- CNN World News
- Sky World News Tonight
- ABC World News Tonight
- ITV News
- Independent Television News
- List of ITV journalists and newsreaders
