= Das Vierte =

2005–2013 German television channel

- Country: Germany
- Broadcast area: Germany, Austria, Switzerland
- Headquarters: Munich, Germany

Programming
- Language: German
- Picture format: 576i (4:3 SDTV)

Ownership
- Owner: NBCUniversal (2005–2008); Mini Movie International / Dmitry Lesnevsky (2008–2012); The Walt Disney Company (2012–2013)

History
- Launched: 29 September 2005; 21 years ago
- Replaced: NBC Europe (in Germany)
- Closed: 31 December 2013; 12 years ago
- Replaced by: Disney Channel (Germany)

Links
- Website: www.das-vierte.de

Das Vierte (English: The Fourth) was a German entertainment channel replaced in January 2014 by Disney Channel.

== History ==
Das Vierte was launched by NBC Universal Global Networks (NUGN) in 2005 as an all-drama programming channel. The channel reached its 1% first-year goal with the expectations of doubling in two to three years. In 2008, NUGN sold the station to Mini Movie International Channel, owned by Dmitri Lesnevsky, as the station was losing money. Lesnevsky expected to turn the station around through rebranding then reselling it. In 2010, Phoenix Media planned to buy the station but that fell through.

As of 2011, the station had a market share of 0.2%.

In September 2012, The Walt Disney Company announced a deal to purchase Das Vierte. Disney closed on the deal by December 2012. In April 2013, Disney announced that Das Vierte would close to re-launch Disney Channel in January 2014. Disney closed the channel on 31 December 2013.

== Programming ==
Das Vierte started with the slogan "Wir sind Hollywood" (We are Hollywood). The programming later moved away from Hollywood productions and towards a cooperation with the Anixe TV network.

- Gene Simmons Family Jewels (Gene Simmons Family Jewels - Papa war ein Kiss) (2007-2009)
- Ghost Hunters International (2009-2010)
- 7th Heaven (Eine himmlische Familie) (2008-2009)
- Airwolf (2006-2009)
- Beverly Hills, 90210 (2006)
- Charlie's Angels (Drei Engel für Charlie) (2007-2008)
- Fat Actress (2007)
- Get Smart (Mini-Max) (2013)
- Hart to Hart (Hart aber herzlich) (2007-2009)
- Hawaii Five-O (Hawaii Fünf-Null) (2006)
- It Takes a Thief (Ihr Auftritt, Al Mundy) (2006-2007)
- Knight Rider (2005-2009)
- Magnum, P.I. (Magnum) (2006)
- Melrose Place (2006)
- Mickey Spillane's Mike Hammer (Mike Hammer) (2007)
- Murphy Brown (2013)
- Once and Again (Noch mal mit Gefühl) (2013)
- Quincy, M.E. (Quincy) (2005-2006)
- Remington Steele (2007-2009)
- Roswell (2009-2010)
- Simon & Simon (2005-2006)
- Starsky & Hutch (2007-2008)
- The Bill Cosby Show (Bill Cosby) (2013)
- The Professionals (Die Profis) (2007–2010)
- The Rockford Files (Detektiv Rockford – Anruf genügt) (2006–2008)
- The Saint (Simon Templar) (2007-2010)
- The Sullivans (Die Sullivans) (2013)
- Unhappily Ever After (Auf schlimmer und ewig) (2013)

== Availability ==
Das Vierte was available via terrestrial transmission in Berlin and Bremen, as well as Europe wide on Astra digital satellite service.

Via the air waves, the station had an availability to 93% of German TV households.

== Audience share ==
=== Germany ===
	January	February	March	April	May	June	July	August	September	October	November	December	Annual average
2005	–	–	–	–	–	–	–	–	–	0.5%	0.5%	0.5%	0.5%
2006	0.6%	0.5%	0.6%	0.6%	0.6%	0.5%	0.7%	0.6%	0.7%	0.7%	0.7%	0.7%	▲0.6%
2007	0.7%	0.7%	0.8%	0.8%	0.8%	0.8%	0.9%	0.8%	0.8%	0.8%	0.8%	0.7%	▲0.8%
2008	0.8%	0.8%	0.8%	0.9%	0.8%	0.7%	1.0%	0.9%	0.8%	0.8%	0.9%	0.9%	0.8%
2009	0.8%	0.7%	0.7%	0.6%	0.6%	0.7%	0.7%	0.7%	0.5%	0.4%	0.4%	0.5%	▼0.6%
2010	0.2%	0.2%	0.2%	0.2%	0.2%	0.2%	0.2%	0.2%	0.2%	0.2%	0.2%	0.1%	▼0.2%
2011	0.2%	0.2%	0.2%	0.2%	0.2%	0.2%	0.2%	0.2%	0.2%	0.2%	0.2%	0.1%	0.2%
2012	0.1%	0.1%	0.2%	0.2%	0.2%	0.2%	0.2%	0.2%	0.2%	0.2%	0.1%	0.1%	0.2%
2013	0.1%	0.1%	0.1%	0.1%	0.1%	0.2%	0.2%	0.2%	0.2%	0.1%	0.1%	0.1%	▼0.1%
