= Diagonal View =

London-based multi channel network owned by Sky

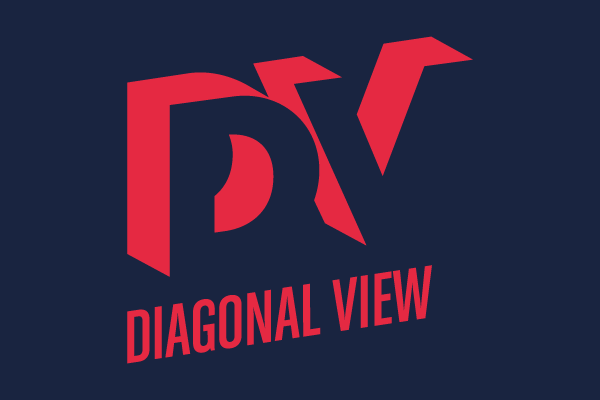
- Type: Division
- Industry: Technology
- Founded: February 27, 2008; 18 years ago
- Founders: Matt Heiman, Steve Carey, ITN in London, United Kingdom
- Headquarters: London, U.K.
- Services: Multi Channel Network
- Revenue: ▲£5.1 million (2018)
- Net income: ▼ -£0.826m (2018)
- Total assets: ▲£0.061 (2018)
- Number of employees: 60
- Parent: Sky Group
- Website: diagonal-view.com

Diagonal View is a Multi Channel Network founded in March 2008 by Matt Heiman and Steve Carey, together with ITN. Unlike many other MCNs who are primary aggregators of content, Diagonal View own and produce the majority of their own videos. A platform agnostic company, their content can be viewed on YouTube, Facebook, Vessel, AOL amongst others. With separate teams working on different platforms, they are thought to be the largest digital content producer outside of the US.

Key channels include All Time 10s, All Time Conspiracies, Football Daily, All Time Movies, Draw My Life and 101 Facts. Talent from both the online and offline worlds to appear on these channels include KSI, Jose Mourinho and Megan Fox.

The company also builds audience for content owners and producers such as the FA, Sony Music, and the Financial Times, and has produced branded content for Net-a-Porter, Samsung, Nintendo and many others.

Diagonal View's content is translated into over ten languages.

Diagonal View was acquired by Sky in March 2017, who now have overall control of the company.

== See also ==
- Multi Channel Network
- Cost Per Mille
- Cost Per Impression
- YouTube
- List of YouTube personalities
