= ITV News at 5:30 =

- ITV News opening sequence
- Also known as: ITV Morning News (1999–2009)
- Presented by: Various
- Voices of: James Faulkner (intro)
- Theme music composer: Dave Hewson
- Opening theme: "News Centre"
- Country of origin: United Kingdom
- Original language: English

Production
- Production locations: ITN Studios, London, England, UK
- Editor: Deborah Turness
- Camera setup: Multi-camera
- Running time: 30 minutes
- Production company: ITN

Original release
- Network: ITV
- Release: 15 February 1988 – 21 December 2012

Related
- ITN World News; ITV Lunchtime News; ITV Evening News; ITV News at Ten; ITV Weekend News

The ITV News at 5:30 is an early morning news bulletin which was broadcast on the British television network ITV from 15 February 1988 until 21 December 2012. It was produced by ITN.

The 30-minute programme covered British national and international news stories, a brief business update, a look at the morning's newspapers and regular NBC News segments and was broadcast at 5:30 am every day. In the event of a major news story, they occasionally went live to the scene or crossed to the newsroom.

== History ==
The programme began as the ITN Morning News on 15 February 1988 with the advent of 24-hour television on ITV; preceding it throughout the night would be 90-second mini-bulletins, fronted by the same anchor as the Morning News. It originally ran for an hour from 5:00am and was the first pre-subscription television outlet in Britain to broadcast regular segments from CNN. The first thirty minutes included a broadcast of the ITN World News, a bulletin intended for the international audience and composed solely of major world stories, and the second thirty minutes focused on national news stories. The practice of including the ITN World News as part of an "hour-long" ITN Morning News ended by 4 March 1991, and the time slot was amended accordingly to 5:30am. During the Christmas period, the programme was shortened to a 5 minute bulletin airing at 5:55am.

In June 2000, almost a year after the major revamp of ITV News output, the Morning News adopted the new look.

Some EPGs and TV listings referred to the programme as the ITV Early Morning News. On 2 November 2009 the ITV Morning News was renamed as simply ITV News to coincide with the re-branding of ITV News output.

On 27 November 2012, it was announced that ITV was to axe the bulletin in favour of delivering content online for itv.com and extra resources to be put into creating a new foreign affairs unit. The last edition of the programme was aired on 21 December 2012, and presented by Sascha Williams.

== Newscasters ==
- Ian Axton
- Zeinab Badawi
- Faye Barker
- Richard Bath
- Sally Biddulph
- Andrea Catherwood
- Steve Clamp
- Bob Crampton
- Guy de Faye
- Katie Derham
- Ali Douglas
- Steve Gaisford
- Phil Gayle
- Jon Gilbert
- Alex Hyndman
- Gwyn Jones
- Sian Jones
- Jackie Kabler
- Sangeeta Kandola
- Rachel McTavish
- Nazanine Moshiri
- Joyce Ohajah
- Nicholas Owen
- Chris Rogers
- Phil Roman
- Isha Sesay
- Salma Siraj
- Alastair Stewart
- John Suchet
- Matt Teale
- Owen Thomas
- Denis Tuohy
- Mark Webster
- Charlene White
- Tim Willcox
- Sascha Williams

== Reporter ==
- Yao Chin (2008–2012)
