= Dmitry Lesnevsky =

Russian-British film producer (born 1970)

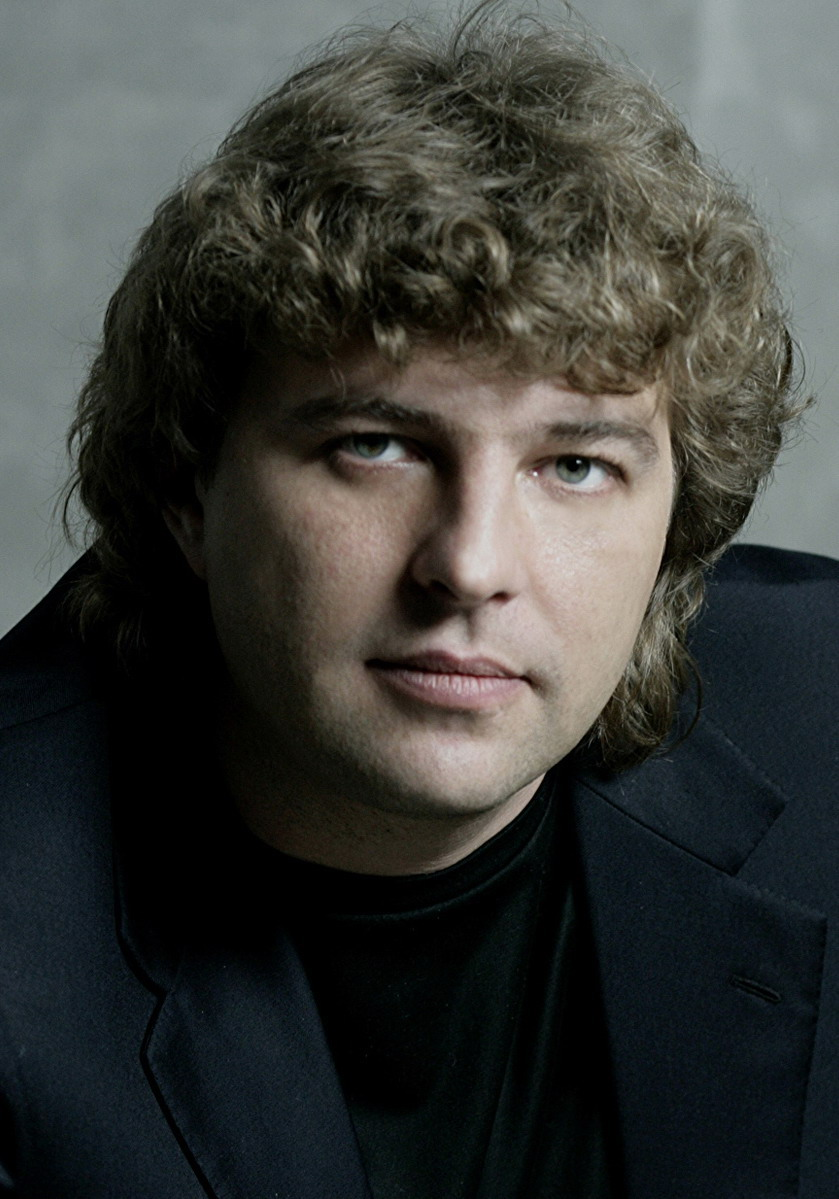
- Born: 2 February 1970 (age 56); Moscow, Soviet Union
- Citizenship: Russia, UK, Israel
- Occupations: film and TV producer and entrepreneur
- Years active: 1991-present
- Spouse: Elena Lesnevskaya

Dmitry Anatolyevich Lesnevsky (Russian: Дми́трий Анато́льевич Лесне́вский; born February 2, 1970) is a Russian-British-Israeli entrepreneur and producer in television, film, publishing and online media.

== Early life ==
Lesnevsky was born to a Jewish family in Moscow in 1970. He graduated from Moscow State University with a degree in Journalism.

== Career ==
In 1991 he co-founded REN TV, one of the first privately held, independent TV production companies in Russia. It produced over twenty programs, all ranked among the highest in the country.

In 1997 Lesnevsky co-founded and served as CEO and General producer (through 2005) of REN-TV Television Network - the second biggest independent TV channel in Russia. REN-TV was particularly renowned for its independent news.

In 2005, Lesnevsky and Iren Lesnevsky sold their shares in REN-TV to RTL Group.

In 2008, Dmitry left Russia and bought German TV network Das Vierte - an independent national TV channel in Germany - which he acquired from NBC Universal.

In 2013, Das Vierte was sold to The Walt Disney Company.

== Film ==
From 2000 to 2005, Dmitry produced over 60 titles of TV Series and Films.

In 2000, he founded REN-FILM Movie Production Company and became its President.

He discovered and helped launch the career of Andrey Zvyaginzev. In 2003, Lesnevsky produced his debut feature film The Return (Vozvrashcheniye).

The feature was Andrei Zviagentsev’s directorial debut . The Return' received a multitude of international awards, including Venice Film Festival (Winner, Golden Lion; Winner, Best First Film); BBC Four World Cinema Awards 2005 (Winner, BBC Four World Cinema Award); European Film Awards (Winner, European Discovery of the Year (Fassbinder Award)); Golden Globe Awards (Nominee, Best Foreign Language Film Russia); César Awards (Nominee, Best Foreign Film).

In 2007, Lesnevsky produced Zviagentsev's next feature film The Banishment (Izgnanie), which won the Best Leading Actor Award (Konstantin Lavronenko) at the 60th Cannes Film Festival.

In 2007, Lesnevsky instituted the Award for Best Short Film that is given at the Cannes Film Festival.

In 2012, he produced The Target, a feature film directed by Alexander Zeldovichwhich premiered at the Berlin Film Festival.

In 2018, Lesnevsky started development and production of the first ever Hollywood motion pictures to send Tom Cruise and director Doug Liman into space. The film is in development with partners Axiom Space and SpaceX.

Lesnevsky became a member of the European Film Academy in 2008, member of Russian National Academy of Motion Picture Arts and Sciences and a member of Nika Russian Academy of Cinema Arts and Science in 2003.

In January 2022, Space Entertainment Enterprise, a British producing company founded by Lesnevsky and his wife Elena, announced a film production studio on Axiom Space orbital module to open in 2025.

== Magazines ==
From 2007 to 2013, Lesnevsky was the co-publisher of The New Times, a Russian politics and social issues weekly magazine, notable for its independent, liberal, democratic and humanitarian orientation, as well as for its investigative journalism. His mother, Iren Lesnevskaya, was co-publisher and chief editor. By decree of the President of the French Republic, she was awarded by the highest award in France for outstanding military or civilian services, the National Order of the Legion of Honour (French: Ordre national de la Légion d'honneur) in the degree of Chevalier in 2009.

In 2005 and 2008 The New Times received the Gerd Bucerius Prize for Free Press in Eastern Europe, now known as Free Media Award.

The New Times ran as a non-profit and was funded by the Lesnevsky Family Fund.

Michael McFaul, the former United States Ambassador to Russia from 2012-2014 to co-founder Iren Lesnevskaya:

“You have made an invaluable contribution to the establishment and development of the Russian media through your many years of work. I would particularly like to acknowledge your efforts in establishing Ren TV and making it a respected independent TV channel. At the same time, it is hard to overestimate the importance of supporting “The New Times” magazine, one of Russia's leading publications. You are truly the standard of journalistic ethics not only in Russia, but in other countries as well”

In 2013 the magazine’s ownership transferred to NGO The New Times Foundation, whose charter states that the magazine is the property of Russian civil society, its readers and subscribers.

== Book Publisher ==
From 1995 to 2014, Lesnevsky was co-founder of Progress-Pleyada Publishing House. It published books in the field of traditional and national spiritual values and classical heritage. Altogether, 173 books titles were published, with an estimated print run of 350 000.

Predominantly, books by authors of the Silver Age were published as well as contemporary Russian authors and poets, such as Aleksandr Solzhenitsyn and Ivan Bunin.

It was a non-profit organization, funded by the Lesnevsky Family Fund.

== Space ==
In 2013, he settled in the UK with his spouse Elena Lesnevsky and four sons, where he began studying entertainment in space.

In 2021, Lesnevsky founded Space Entertainment Enterprise (S.E.E.), a British-based media company that develops multi-platform space-based entertainment, music and sports, using the microgravity environment.

In 2022, Space Entertainment Enterprise announced that they have partnered with Axiom Space to launch the world's first space-based entertainment studio, known as SEE-1. SEE-1 will be a multipurpose entertainment and content studio in space and will expand Axiom's vision of an expansive and thriving low-Earth orbit economy. This microgravity media venue will comprise one-fifth of Axiom Station's initial configuration when it is completed and will be ready to separate from the ISS in 2030.

== Family ==
He is married to Elena Lesnevsky and has four sons.

== Recognition ==
- 12 TEFI award winner (Russian equivalent of the Emmy award)
- Member of the Russian Academy of Television
- Manager of the Year Award given by the National Journalist Union in 2000
- Peter the Great National Award (Russia’s most notable award in the field of management) for “Outstanding Contribution to the Development of Contemporary Russian Film Production” in 2003.
