= ITV News Channel =

British television news channel (2000–2005)

- Final logo used from 2004 to 2005
- Country: United Kingdom
- Headquarters: ITN Studios, London

Programming
- Language: English
- Picture format: 576i (SDTV)

Ownership
- Owner: ITN (2000–2002); NTL (2000–2004); Carlton Communications and Granada plc (2002–2004); ITV plc (2004–2005)
- Sister channels: ITV1; ITV2; ITV3

History
- Launched: 1 August 2000; 26 years ago
- Closed: 23 December 2005; 20 years ago
- Replaced by: ITV4 (2005); CITV (2006)
- Former names: ITN News Channel (2000–2002)

Links
- Website: itv.com/news

Availability (At time of closure)

Terrestrial
- Freeview: Channel 81

The ITV News Channel was a 24-hour television news channel in the United Kingdom which broadcast from 1 August 2000 to 23 December 2005. It was available on Sky, NTL:Telewest, and analogue cable. It was also available during the morning on ITV Digital. The channel was carried by its replacement Freeview, although the launch of ITV4 saw its hours on that platform reduced to 6:00 am to 6:00 pm.

The channel broadcast a rolling schedule of national and international news plus regular business, sport, entertainment and weather summaries. Priority was usually given to breaking news stories. There was also an added focus on British stories, drawing on the resources of the ITV network's regional newsrooms.

== History ==
=== As ITN News Channel ===
ITN announced in the late summer of 1999 that it was set to launch its own news channel, initially by the end of the year, with the aim of competing against BBC News 24, Sky News and CNN International. Taking a long time to launch the channel would undermine ITN's efficacy within a few years.

The channel launched on 1 August 2000 as a joint venture between ITN and NTL as the ITN News Channel. The channel was touted as "the world's first multimedia news channel", with availability on digital radio and mobile phones, in conjunction to the existing television platforms.

=== As ITV News Channel ===
In June 2002, Carlton Television and Granada Television – the predecessors of ITV plc – bought out ITN's 65% stake. This led to a rebrand as the ITV News Channel on 30 September 2002.

From the February 2004 relaunch, along with the rest of ITV News, the channel was presented from the so-called "theatre of news" set, a large virtual studio allowing presentation either from behind a desk or by presenters walking around, using the news wall to explain a story with the aid of graphics. For the first time, two presenters could present the channel together, which the management viewed as an improvement.

In April 2004, the newly created ITV plc bought NTL's 35% stake to assume full control of the channel.

=== Closure ===
On 14 December 2005, it was confirmed that the channel would close down in 2006, in order to use its Freeview bandwidth (which was already timeshared with ITV4) to launch the CITV channel based on the existing CITV brand, and to use its funding to boost ITV News coverage on the main ITV network. ITV stated that it would launch new bulletins on ITV2 and ITV3, but this did not materialise.

The closure was subsequently brought forward and the channel closed down on Friday 23 December 2005 at 18:00 (GMT). The reason given was that it would have been unfair to expect the channel's staff to work long hours over Christmas knowing that the channel would soon be closing.

The schedule for the last day of transmission on the ITV News Channel:

- 07:00 – The Scott Chisholm Show
- 10:00 – ITV News Live with Alastair Stewart
- 11:45 – The Scott Chisholm Show
- 12:30 – ITV Lunchtime News simulcast
- 13:30 – ITV News Live with Faye Barker
- 15:00 – ITV News Live with Nicholas Owen and Nina Hossain
- 16:00 – ITV News Live with Owen Thomas and Faye Barker
- 17:30 – Special: Five Years of the News Channel, presented by Alastair Stewart

At the end of the final programme, Alastair Stewart closed the channel with the words:

So that's the end of five years broadcasting as the ITV News Channel. Our thanks to all our contributors, studio and production staff, to all the reporters and correspondents and everyone who made the channel the professional and effective operation that it was. But most of all, you, our viewers. A big thank you to each and every one of you. We hope we both informed and occasionally entertained you over the years. It was our mission to bring you the fastest breaking news and the most comprehensive analysis. We hope that you'll think we succeeded.

The picture then faded out to a blank screen for three seconds before fading back in to the ITN end board. The station closed shortly afterwards.

=== Post-closure ===
On 15 June 2007, ITN chief executive Mark Wood said the company would not rule out launching another 24-hour TV news channel. There was also speculation that cable group Virgin Media was considering launching its own news channel to rival Sky News and BBC News, with some reports suggesting that it might look to partner with ITN. Later that year, Setanta Sports News was launched, a tie up between Virgin Media and ITN which lasted until Setanta was out into administration in June 2009.

In July 2022, it was reported that the new streaming platform ITVX would feature an ITV News 24/7 service. The service would provide ITV News around the clock as well as providing an on-demand service for in-depth investigations, explanatory and eye-witness journalism. The service would not be a conventional rolling news channel but it would have occasional live programmes and bulletins. Instead, the service would focus on video on-demand content which would be continuously updated. ITVX began rolling out on 17 November 2022, and fully launched on 8 December 2022.

== Programming and presentation ==
News content and programming for the channel was provided by ITN.

As the ITN News Channel, it was broadcast from a small studio with accommodation for only one presenter at a time. When relaunched as the ITV News Channel, it initially used the standard ITV News studio of the time, which was built for fixed length bulletins only, so the style of presentation was always more basic than that of its competitors.

As the channel shared facilities with ITV News bulletins on the ITV network (which were also simulcast on the news channel), it had to move to other studios for around an hour before each ITV bulletin to allow for rehearsals. Initially a single locked-off camera studio was used at these times, which was very basic. Later the channel used a virtual reality studio at these times or, following ITN's takeover of the production of London Tonight, that studio.

The channel used to broadcast live ITV Sport coverage of UEFA Champions League football matches, whenever two British teams were playing simultaneously. When a breaking news bulletin was being reported, the news report would take the full screen while the football would be shown in an inset in the corner.

== Presenters ==
During the period as the ITN News Channel, its pool of presenters were from across the ITN programme portfolio of ITV News, Channel 4 News and 5 News, along with occasional freelancers. Presenters included John Suchet, John Nicolson, Leyla Daybelge, Alison Bell, Andrew Harvey, Sharon Grey, Owen Thomas, Ian Axton, Kirsty Lang, Simon Vigar, Lloyd Bracey, Sasha Herriman and Rachel McTavish.

When the channel became the ITV News Channel, presenters from ITV News on the ITV Network began presenting the news channel. For the first month of so before any regular appearances occurred, many reporters also presented on the News Channel, including Ros Childs, who presented after John Suchet on the first day after the rebranding to the ITV News Channel. During the Iraq war the well-known British newscaster Angela Rippon presented on the channel and then went on to host a regular weekend programme in 2004 and 2005.

Following the February 2004 relaunch, presenters included ITN veteran Alastair Stewart who hosted the flagship Live with Alastair Stewart programme every weekday morning. Andrew Harvey, Lucy Alexander, Leyla Daybelge, Chris Rogers, Phil Gayle, Owen Thomas and Sasha Herriman were also used. All of ITV News' main presenters, with the exception of Trevor McDonald, had also appeared on the channel. Presenters from ITV's regional news programmes and freelancers also regularly appeared on the channel at weekends and holiday periods.

In December 2005 Scott Chisholm, part of the original 1989 Sky News team, joined the channel to present the breakfast programme, which lasted just two weeks due to the channel's closure.

From the 2 February 2004 relaunch, the channel's typical weekday schedule was usually the following:

- 05:30 – ITV Morning News, simulcast live with ITV
- 06:00 – Repeats of ITV Morning News
- 07:00 – ITV News Live with Lucy Alexander and Andrew Harvey
- 10:00 – ITV News Live with Alastair Stewart And Lucy Alexander
- 11:45 – ITV News Live with Andrew Harvey (would include PMQs at 12.00pm on Wednesdays)
- 12:30 – ITV Lunchtime News with Nicholas Owen, simulcast live with ITV
- 13:00 – ITV News Live with Leyla Daybelge
- 14:00 – ITV News Live with Steve Scott
- 15:00 – ITV News Live with Mark Austin and Mary Nightingale
- 16:00 – ITV News Live with Steve Scott
- 17:30 – ITV News Live with Leyla Daybelge
- 18:30 – ITV Evening News with Mark Austin and Mary Nightingale, simulcast with ITV
- 19:00 – ITV News Live with Joyce Ohajah
- 20:00 – ITV News Live with Felicity Barr
- 21:00 – ITV News Live with Steve Scott
- 21:30 – ITV News Network with Steve Scott, broadcast from the London Tonight studio
- 22:00 – ITV News at Ten with Steve Scott, broadcast from the London Tonight studio
- 22:30 – ITV News at 10.30 with Trevor McDonald, simulcast live with ITV
- 23:00 – ITV News Live with Joyce Ohajah
- 01:00 until 05:30 – Repeats of ITV News at Ten with live news summaries on the hour

On some weeknights they would simply rerun the 23:00 hour through the night with live summaries on the hour. On other weeknights they would have a live 30 minute newscast with in view sign language, which would then be repeated through the night with live summaries on the hour.

== Competition ==
The channel's main competitors were Sky News and BBC News 24.

At times of breaking UK news of importance to audiences in Australia, such as terrorist attacks, the channel was sometimes relayed by Australia's Nine Network. However, the Nine Network usually preferred the Sky News feed, to which it had equal access.

== See also ==
- List of ITV journalists and newsreaders
