= ITN =

British-based news and content provider

Independent Television News Limited
- Logo used since 2022

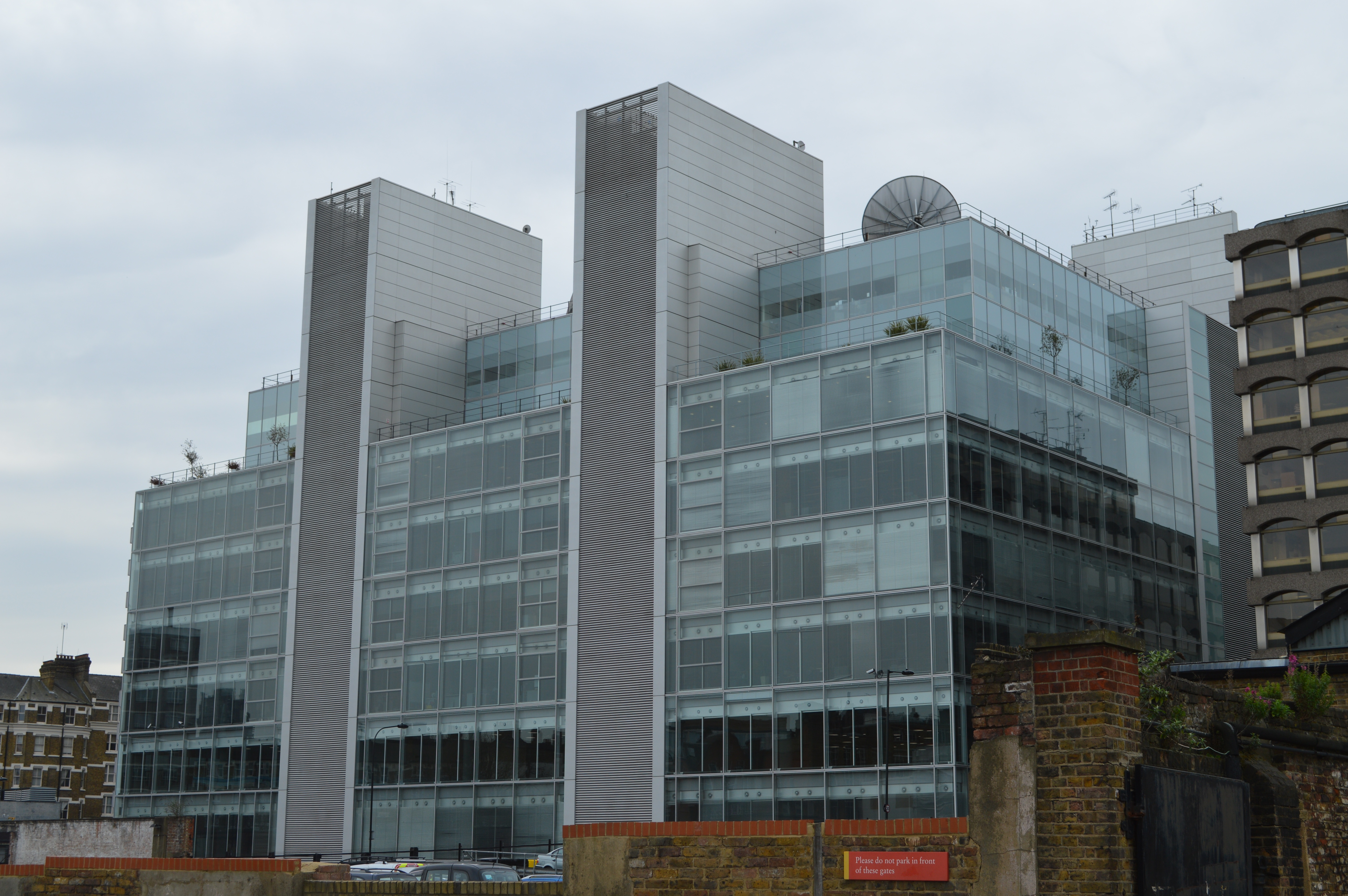
- Headquarters at 200 Gray's Inn Road
- Type: Private
- Genre: Media Production and News Broadcasting
- Founded: 4 May 1955 (71 years ago)
- Founder: Independent Television Authority
- Headquarters: 200 Gray's Inn Road, London, United Kingdom
- Key people: Ian Rumsey (CEO)
- Revenue: ▲£135.9 million (2019)
- Operating income: ▲£2.4 million (2019)
- Net income: ▲£1.7 million (2018)
- Total assets: ▲£39 million (2019)
- Total equity: ▲£105.4 million (2019)
- Owners: ITV plc (through ITV Broadcasting Limited, 40%); DMGT (20%); Thomson Reuters (20%); Informa (20%)
- Number of employees: 706 (2019)
- Website: itn.co.uk

Independent Television News (ITN) is a UK-based media production and broadcast journalism company. ITN is based in London, with bureaux and offices in Beijing, Brussels, Jerusalem, Johannesburg, New York, Paris, Sydney and Washington, D.C.

ITN produces the daily news programmes for ITV, Channel 4 and 5 in the UK, and in recent years has diversified to produce a wide range of content including documentaries, sports, advertising and digital material for a range of international clients.

Between 1955 and 1999, ITN was more commonly known as the general brand name of ITV's news programmes. Since 8 March 1999, ITV has used ITV News as the brand name for its news programmes, though ITN continues as the network's news provider. The network's largest franchise owner, ITV plc (through its Channel 3 franchising subsidiary ITV Broadcasting Limited), is the largest shareholder of ITN, owning 40% of the company's shares. Other shareholders are Daily Mail and General Trust, Thomson Reuters and Informa plc, each owning 20% of shares.

== History ==
After the Independent Television Authority (ITA) awarded the first six ITV franchises to four companies, it decided that national news should be provided by a separate contractor. ITN was founded in May 1955 by a consortium of the initial four broadcasting companies, with former Labour MP Aidan Crawley as editor-in-chief. The first bulletin was broadcast at 10 pm on 22 September 1955 on ITV's launch night. Its original theme tune was 'Non Stop', by John Malcolm, which was used for the next 30 years. The bulletin was presented by former champion athlete Christopher Chataway. From the start, ITN broke new ground by introducing in-vision and named 'newscasters' (rather than BBC News's nameless and sound-only 'newsreaders'), and reporter packages. The unique, probing reporting style of Robin Day caused shock among politicians, finding themselves questioned continually for information – this had never been the case with the BBC. There were also some early tensions with the ITV companies. ABC Weekend TV, the ITV contractor for the north and Midlands on weekends, immediately called for shorter ITN bulletins. While the ITA ruled on a minimum of a 20-minute bulletin, disagreements with the ITV companies over ITN's budget triggered the resignation of Crawley after just one year in 1956. He was replaced by Geoffrey Cox.

ITN continued to develop its service to the ITV network with an agenda to firstly, fulfil its public service broadcasting requirements and secondly satisfy the ITV companies by attracting viewers. Under this method, ITN continued to differentiate itself from the BBC by conducting probing interviews, introducing more human interest stories and bringing ordinary people on to screen by using so-called 'vox pops' (interviews, usually held in the street, with members of the general public), all of which were seen as a radical departure at the time in British broadcasting. In 1956 the General Post Office ended its Fourteen Day Rule prohibiting discussion on television of topics for debate in Parliament during the following two weeks. As the ITN reporter and later ITN political editor Julian Haviland, put it: "My view was that at ITN we must be at least as responsible and accurate as the BBC, without being so damned boring". As ITV expanded, each ITV company that made up the network's federal structure had to purchase a stake in ITN and to continue to finance the company.

Although ITN had far fewer resources than BBC News—as late as the early 1970s it only had one overseas reporter, in Washington DC—ITN in 1967 was given the go-ahead by the ITA to provide a full 30-minute daily news programme at 10 pm. There was further tension with the ITV executives as they were sceptical of the idea that viewers would want a full 30 minutes of news every Monday to Friday and they were also losing valuable peak time slots which could be used for the sale of commercial advertising. News at Ten began broadcasting on 3 July 1967 with a newscaster team consisting of Alastair Burnet, Andrew Gardner, George Ffitch and Reginald Bosanquet. It was initially given a 13-week trial run; however, the programme proved to be extremely popular with viewers and continued for a further 32 years. News at Ten was to become one of the most prestigious news programmes of its time in British history with a reputation for high-quality journalism and innovation. ITN's News at Ten also prompted the BBC to gradually expand its 20:50 news bulletin from ten minutes to fifteen, twenty and then twenty-five minutes. The Nine O'Clock News began broadcasting in 1970 as News at Ten's rival. ITN also established other programmes in the ITV schedule. First Report, a lunchtime bulletin began in 1972 and by 1976, News at 5.45 commenced. This was a period when ITN enjoyed its greatest plaudits, following Lord Annan's 1977 report on the future of broadcasting, which declared: "We subscribe to the generally held view that ITN has the edge over BBC news."

ITN obtained the contract to produce Channel 4 News when the channel started broadcasting in 1982. The programme was launched by Peter Sissons, Trevor McDonald and Sarah Hogg. The hour-long programme has been broadcast at 7 pm since it started and has a reputation for high-quality journalism and thorough analysis. Further expansion came with the launch of overnight television on ITV in 1988, with ITN providing hourly news bulletins, as well as the half-hour ITN Morning News to conclude the overnight schedules.

Until the 1990s, the individual ITV companies had an obligation to provide a national news programme, which required them to take a share in the ITN operation. Following the Broadcasting Act 1990, ITN had to apply and bid for a licence to provide such services on these ITV networks, and would have to fight competition in order to preserve its services, as had become the case with other ITV franchisees. The Broadcasting Act also allowed the Independent Television Commission to introduce ownership rules for news providers. The move was to transform the company from a 'cost centre' to a 'profit-making business'. The move saw 400 staff made redundant, and the closure of a number of international bureaux to claw back a £10 million deficit in order to provide a competitive product to obtain the ITV news contract. Within three years the company turned to profit in 1993 with suggestions at the time that the company should be listed on the stock exchange.

The company launched 5 News in 1997 following the foundation of Channel 5.

The 1990s saw major changes to the television landscape in Britain. The growth of multichannel television saw ITV's share of audience fall. Against this backdrop ITV itself became increasingly commercially aggressive. This was to be a major turning point in ITN's history which saw a reduction in the ITV news contract. By this period the main ITV companies Granada and Carlton had also viewed unfavourably the scheduling of News at Ten which became a subject of dispute between ITN and the ITV companies. ITN favoured keeping the bulletin; however, the ITV companies claimed audiences were lost at 10 pm as the news interrupted films and drama programming. News at Ten eventually ended in March 1999 with ITN's flagship bulletin moved to 6.30 pm with a shorter late night bulletin at 11 pm. Consolidation of the ITV network under a unified ITV brand also saw the removal of the on-screen ITN brand which was replaced with ITV News. From this point, the ITN brand was gradually phased out and it is now only referenced to in the end production caption.

In 1997, ITN started producing the Royal Christmas Message every other year.

The early years of the 21st century was to prove to be a challenging period. The axing of News at Ten caused public outcry and ITN's viewership figures fell by 13.9% Political pressure and pressure from the media resulted in ITV bringing back a shorter 20-minute bulletin at 10 pm three nights a week. The programme eventually lost share to the BBC News at Ten (which launched in 2000 to capitalise on ITV's move) and ITV eventually axed the programme again in 2004 and moved the bulletin to 10:30 pm before bringing it back to 10 pm again in 2008. The biggest challenge came in 2001 when British Sky Broadcasting bid to supply network news to ITV as part of a consortium. ITN eventually succeeded and was awarded a contract extension to 2008. In January 2005 Sky News took over supplying bulletins to Channel 5; ITN had produced 5 News since its launch in 1997 and the contract was returned in February 2012, following a change of ownership at Channel 5.

Previous ITN logo, used between 2006 and 2022. Variations of this logo were used by ITN from the launch of colour on ITV in 1969 until 2022.

In August 2000, ITN launched its own 24-hour news channel in the UK, broadcast on satellite, cable and digital terrestrial. It was 50% owned by ITN and 50% owned by NTL. Carlton and Granada gradually bought out the two stakes and renamed the channel the ITV News Channel. It closed down on 23 December 2005. Poor ratings in comparison to BBC News 24 and Sky News, and ITV's desire to re-use the channel's allocation on Freeview, were cited as the reasons.

In March 2004 following its acquisition of the London News Network, a company previously owned by the now merged Carlton and Granada, ITN began producing local news bulletins for the ITV London region. ITN produced More4 News between 2005 and 2009. In 2007 it began producing Setanta Sports News; however it closed in 2009.

Between 1996 and 2002, it also owned a share of London News Radio, which was based at ITN's Gray's Inn Road headquarters and operated the LBC and News Direct London radio stations. Since 5 October 1992, ITN used to operate a radio news service on behalf of Independent Radio News (IRN) but on 15 October 2008, IRN announced that Sky News Radio was to replace ITN as its main supplier from March 2009.

While news production remains the cornerstone of ITN's business model, the company has diversified from its original remit. ITN Source (originally ITN Archive) is one of the world's largest sources of historical film. ITN Productions creates multi-platform content for major global brands, covering genres such as factual, entertainment, news and corporate production. Clients that commission programmes from ITN Productions include major UK and international broadcasters such as ITV, the BBC, Channel 4, Channel 5, History and Discovery, with television commissions including Climbing Great Buildings on BBC2 and Mud Men on the History Channel.

== News and current affairs programmes ==
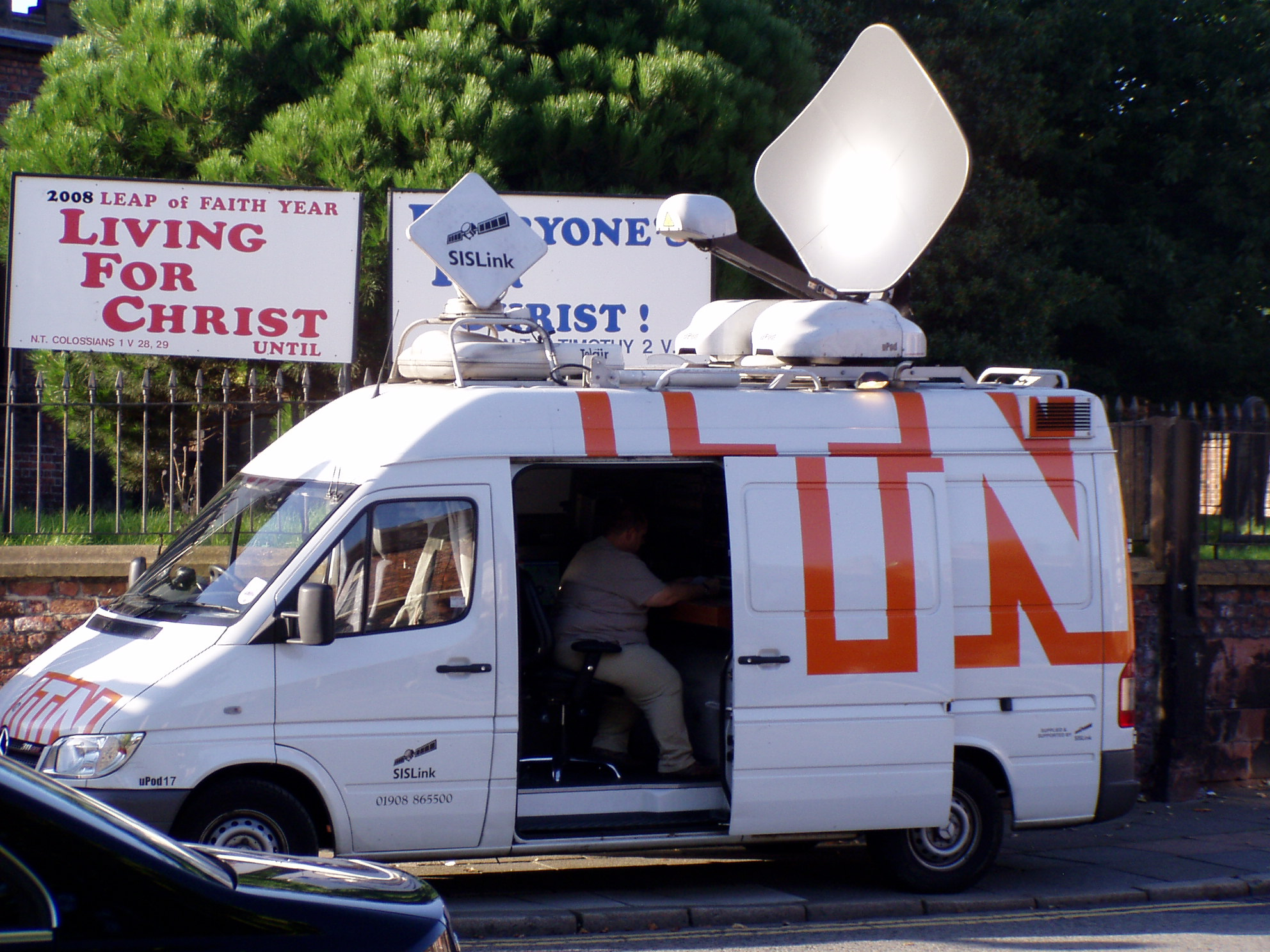
An ITN satellite van

=== ITV News ===
ITN has produced all national news bulletins on ITV since the network was launched on 22 September 1955. Originally, the ITN logo and brand featured prominently on all news bulletins on ITV; however, since March 1999, bulletins have been branded as ITV News. Trademarks of ITV News include the use of the clock-face of the Elizabeth Tower of Westminster Palace, the chimes of Big Ben punctuating the day's headlines and the signature theme tune; The Awakening by Johnny Pearson.

Throughout the early years, ITN established programmes in the ITV schedule including First Report at lunchtime, News at 5.45 in the evening and the flagship News at Ten. Today, ITV News on weekdays broadcasts the ITV Lunchtime News at 1.30pm, the ITV Evening News at 6.30pm and ITV News at Ten with bulletins broadcast at various times on weekends. ITN has at times interrupted the ITV schedule to provide updates on major breaking stories of national and international importance, including the September 11 attacks, London bombings, 2005 or events involving the British royal family. ITN has covered every general election since 1959 for ITV, providing comprehensive coverage of the counts throughout election night and has also broadcast special programmes covering the UK budget speech given by the Chancellor of the Exchequer.

ITN's history is inextricably linked to that of ITV as prior to the Broadcasting Act 1990 each of the ITV companies owned a share. In the 1990s, under new ownership, it was accused of abandoning its previous news style, which was broadsheet in style to mid-market tabloid with news stories that focused on personalities in the news, leading to accusations of dumbing down.

ITN's most famous news programme, News at Ten was also controversially replaced by an 11 pm news bulletin in 1999, said to be in order to allow ITV to broadcast films without the interruption of a 10 pm news bulletin. News at Ten was subsequently reinstated in 2001 after heavy public criticism over the change. The restored programme was 10 minutes shorter than its predecessor and carried less in-depth news coverage. It was also broadcast at a later time at least one day a week, which meant it was often jokingly referred to as News at When? There was increasing speculation that the News at Ten would again be moved, after under-performing against the BBC's Ten O'Clock News on BBC One which broadcasts every night at 10:00 pm. In October 2003, the Independent Television Commission gave ITV approval to move News at Ten.

The ITV News at 10.30 launched on ITV on 2 February 2004 (the day that ITV in England, Wales and Southern Scotland came under the ownership of a single company) and was presented by Sir Trevor McDonald. The programme was longer than its predecessor and carried an integrated regional bulletin, as well as more business stories, a nightly sports update and a preview of the following day's newspapers. Mark Austin took over main presenting duties on 3 January 2006.

The rebranded programme again saw new titles, this time featuring people walking over the face of Big Ben and has lately followed a more "sensationalist" approach to its main headlines. When ITV executive chairman Michael Grade joined ITV, he made it clear that he saw news as the key to defining any channel. On 14 January 2008, the News at Ten returned, presented by Julie Etchingham and McDonald returned to his duties again. Mark Austin joined Etchingham as co-presenter in November 2008. As of October 2015, Tom Bradby has been the main presenter on the programme.

The ITV Evening News has, since it was launched in 1999, been the network's most popular bulletin. Its main presenter is Mary Nightingale.

In March 2004, ITN took over production of ITV London's regional news programmes, which relocated from The London Television Centre on the South Bank to ITN's Gray's Inn Road base.

On 24 January 2022, ITV announced that the 6:30pm ITV Evening News would be extended to an hour from March 2022. This made it the third hour long news programme ITN produces for the national PSB channels in 2022, along with Channel 4 News and 5 News at 5.

As part of the restructure of ITV Daytime due to cost saving and efficiencies, ITN took on the production of Good Morning Britain, under the ITV News banner. The move saw production move from Television Centre to ITN headquarters in Central London, with the first broadcast on 5 January 2026. The programme was also extended to run from 6:00 am to 10:00 am daily for 22 weeks of the year, and 6:00 am to 9:30 am for 30 weeks of the year, continuing to be available on ITVX after broadcast. The final broadcast from Television Centre was on 31 December 2025.

=== Channel 4 News ===
ITN is home to Channel 4 News, having produced the programme since the channel's inception in 1982.

The Channel 4 News flagship programme is 55 minutes of in-depth news and current affairs broadcast at 7 pm each weekday and at 6:30 pm on Saturdays and Sundays. The weekday evening programme was anchored by journalist Jon Snow for 32 years until 23 December 2021, with the programme now being presented by a range of newscasters, including Unreported World presenter Krishnan Guru-Murthy.

A five-minute-long news summary goes out Monday to Friday at midday. The bulletin replaced Channel 4's 30-minute News at Noon programme in late 2009, six years after its launch during the Iraq War of 2003.

ITN created More4 News when the digital channel More4 was launched in October 2005. It ran at 8 pm, immediately after Channel 4 News. It was originally presented by Sarah Smith; Kylie Morris took over presenting duties in June 2007 and Smith was posted to the US as Channel 4 News' Washington correspondent. In December 2009, Channel 4 cancelled More4 News.

=== 5 News ===
From the launch of Channel 5 in 1997, ITN provided the news bulletins for 5 News. However, in January 2005, ITN lost the contract, which was awarded to Sky News. In 2011 ITN regained the contract in a three-year deal to provide news for Channel 5 from early 2012, but on a much-reduced budget. The deal followed an agreement by Sky and Northern & Shell, the then-owner of Channel 5, to terminate the 5 News contract early.

In addition to a number of short bulletins, ITN provided two main half-hour evening news programmes for Channel 5 until 2021. In September 2021, Ofcom approved the removal of the 6.30pm news slot by Channel 5 in order for the ViacomCBS channel to schedule Neighbours at 6pm and Eggheads at 6.30pm with a new hour long 5 News programme going out on the channel at 5pm. Ofcom's approval of the channel's new conditions recognised that there were still three-hours of news between 5–8pm over all the main public service broadcasters’ channels, and that Channel 5 was still committed to delivering more than 280 hours of news each year. The relaunched hour long 5 News at 5 was first broadcast by the channel on 8 November 2021, with the programme presented by Sian Williams and Claudia-Liza Vanderpuije. In addition to the channel's news, ITN was given an extra hour slot by Channel 5 in January 2022 to extend their daily current affairs phone-in and discussion show Jeremy Vine each weekday morning.

=== The Wright Stuff/Jeremy Vine ===
In 2018, ITN secured the contract for Channel 5's topical morning debate and chat show The Wright Stuff, just before the host of 18 years, Matthew Wright, announced he was going to leave the programme. Wright was replaced by BBC Radio 2 presenter Jeremy Vine, who had been hosting a lunchtime phone-in debate show on the radio since 2003, with the programme becoming eponymously named when Vine took over in September 2018. In 2022, the programme was extended by Channel 5, with the extra hour being known as Jeremy Vine Extra as it is presented by Storm Huntley rather than Vine, who starts his radio show at noon.

== Other programmes of note ==
=== Royal Documentaries on 5 ===
ITN's royal documentaries have been a ratings winner for 5 on Saturday nights, with programmes released about the current monarchy under names such as Harry and Meghan: Two Troubled Years, Charles and Camilla: King and Queen in Waiting and Fergie & Andrew The Duke & Duchess of Disaster. Documentaries about the past members of the British Royal Family are also getting good viewing figures, with a programme about King George V (whose reign was from 6 May 1910 until 20 January 1936) achieving a rating of 1.4 million viewers when it was first broadcast. Most of these documentaries feature archive clips with contributions from historians and royal watchers such as former BBC royal correspondent Jennie Bond or Lady Colin Campbell. As well as the British Royal Family, the slot had also been used to schedule an ITN documentary called The Grace of Monaco: Hollywood Princess about Grace Kelly, the American actor who married Prince Rainier III of Monaco in April 1956, one of the few ITN royal titles featuring foreign-born royalty.

=== Other Royal Documentaries ===
ITN also made the documentary Charles: Our New King for Beyond Rights, with the programme scheduled for a transmission slot on Channel 4, The Smithsonian Channel (in North America), SBS and M6. Similar to ITN's programmes for Channel 5, the programme was a trawl through its Royal archive with experts like Ayesha Hazarika, Bonnie Greer, Polly Toynbee and Ian Skelly analysing various points in King Charles' life.

== Operations ==
=== ITN Productions ===
ITN Productions was formed in February 2010 and incorporates the non-news operations of ITN, including the former ITN On, ITN Factual and ITN Corporate divisions.

Showbiz bulletins from ITN are broadcast daily on a number of television channels, including FYI Daily on ITV2, ITV3 and ITV4, and Entertainment News on 5 (formally called Access) for Channel 5's range of channels. A daily showbiz breakfast show, The Breakfast Fix was broadcast on 4Music along with showbiz updates under the name of The Fix.

From August 2013, ITN Productions was awarded the contract to produce the Premier League online and mobile highlights service for News UK. Content appears on The Sun and The Times subscription websites and mobile apps.

ITN Productions also creates factual programming for ITV, Channel 4 and Channel 5 as well as international broadcasters, including Discovery Channel, History, PBS and National Geographic.

ITN has produced shows for Sky, with one of its later programmes being Harrow: A Very British School.

ITN also supplied programming to the now-closed Teachers TV service.

=== Former operations ===
ITN began its own World News bulletins in the late 1980s, which were shown around the world on local television channels, particularly on PBS stations in the US, where presenter Daljit Dhaliwal (now with Al-Jazeera English) enjoyed cult status. These were discontinued in 2001, in the face of competition from dedicated news channels such as BBC World (now known as BBC World News), although it still provides footage to CNN International and reports often appear on PBS NewsHour. Its ITV Evening News bulletin was shown on the Newsworld International cable channel in the US.

From December 1997 to April 2003, ITN held a 49% stake in European news channel Euronews.

ITN launched a 24-hour news channel on 1 August 2000, which in 2002 was sold to the main ITV companies Carlton and Granada, and rebranded as the ITV News Channel. It was closed down on 23 December 2005.

On the same day, ITN launched a 24-hour radio station called ITN News Radio. It broadcast nationally on the Digital One multiplex until 2003.

In 2005, ITN became a shareholder in Espresso Group, a provider of digital content to more than 60% of primary schools in the UK and also internationally. Espresso services feature an extensive library of broadband teaching resources and student activities to motivate pupils and support teachers, including content from ITN Source. In May 2008, the Education Clip Library, a unique, video licensing service for educational publishers and broadcasters around the world, was launched. It is aimed at educational publishers and broadcasters seeking to add video to their instructional products and services. Espresso was acquired by Discovery Education (part of Discovery Communications) on 7 November 2013.

Setanta Sports News was a 24-hour sports news television channel produced by ITN and jointly owned by Virgin Media Television and Setanta Sports, launched on 29 November 2007. The channel ceased broadcasting on 23 June 2009, when Setanta's UK operation were placed into administration following financial difficulties.

In October 2008, ITN founded digital production company Diagonal View as a joint venture together with digital entrepreneur Matt Heiman. The company packages footage from the ITN archive and syndicates it to a range of commercial partners including Myspace, YouTube and MSN. In March 2017, the company was sold to Sky, who paid £2.6m for ITN's stake.

ITN Consulting was the management consultancy arm of ITN, combining the resources of ITN with the consulting team's experience to advise global media companies on issues spanning all areas of strategy and operations, including financial planning, marketing, scheduling and content, recruitment, and interim management. With partner Venture Consulting, it had offices in London, Milan, Dubai, Singapore and Sydney. It operated as a network with its consultants working on engagements globally and focused "on how strategy can be implemented to deliver to real change". ITN Consulting stated that "an understanding of how global, regional and local media markets conflict and come together enables them to identify the opportunities this creates". They took an external, outsider perspective as well as having the viewpoint of senior "insider" media executives. ITN Consulting was extensively involved in the development of business plans for local TV in the UK. It also consulted a range of national broadcasters on improving performance. The unit closed in 2012.

ITN Source (formerly ITN Archive) licensed video footage from ITN's one million hours of archive content including news, drama, celebrity, comedy, music, wildlife, natural history and film. It also syndicated on-the-day news footage generated by ITN to other broadcasters and producers worldwide. The service represented the moving image libraries of Reuters, ITV (including ITV Studios), ANI, UTV Media, Fox News, Fox Movietone, Gaumont-British, Nine Network and other specialist collections. The division was closed at the end of 2016, when ITN outsourced its archive sales to Getty Images.

== Corporate affairs ==
=== Headquarters and studios ===
ITN has been based at 200 Gray's Inn Road since 1991. The purpose-built headquarters were designed by architect Sir Norman Foster, and officially opened by Queen Elizabeth II on 8 May 1991. The building also houses the ITV Network Centre and Warner Bros. offices. Prior to the redevelopment, the site was the location of The Times and The Sunday Times offices from 1974 to 1986, and The Guardian offices from 1961 to 1976.

ITN's first base was Ingersoll House on Kingsway, before moving across the road to Associated-Rediffusion's newly converted Television House shortly before the first broadcast.

In August 1969, the company moved to ITN House at 48 Wells Street, close to the BBC's Broadcasting House.

As of February 2026, there are three operational television studios based at ITN. Studios 1 and 2 are located in the basement of the building, with both studios measuring 2,438 sq ft in size each. Studio 1 is currently used by Good Morning Britain, the ITV News bulletins and the ITV News London bulletins. Studio 2 is used by 5 News and also produces Jeremy Vine's morning show on 5. Studio 6 is located adjacent to the atrium of ITN and has been home to Channel 4 News since 1999.

=== Leadership ===
Ian Rumsey was appointed Chief Executive of ITN in May 2026, succeeding Rachel Corp. Since joining ITN in 2005, Rumsey has held senior leadership roles across the organisation, including as Programme Editor of ITV News at Ten and as Chief Content Officer, running ITN Productions, ITN’s creative content division.

Rachel Corp was ITN Chief Executive from 2022 to 2026. A former ITV News Editor, Corp succeeded Deborah Turness in September 2022, when Turness left to join the BBC. Prior to Turness, ITN was led by Anna Mallett, who left to join Netflix. Mallett had been in post for around two years, having joined the company in April 2019.

The Times reported in 2022, that one former ITN staff member signed a secrecy clause or NDA after accepting a financial settlement and agreeing to drop allegations of victimisation and sex discrimination inside the company. The woman said she raised her grievance in 2020 after ITN’s then chief executive, Anna Mallett, told staff she wanted to create "a culture where people feel confident to speak up".

=== Ownership ===
The current shareholders of ITN are:

- ITV plc (40%)
- Daily Mail and General Trust (20%)
- Thomson Reuters (20%)
- Informa (20%)

Upon its inception, ITN was jointly owned by all the ITV operating companies, with shareholdings split roughly in proportion to each company's advertising income. However, the Broadcasting Act 1990 allowed the ITC to set ownership rules. It was decided to limit the ITV companies to a maximum joint 49% stake, with no single company allowed more than a 20% holding. The powers were abolished by the Communications Act 2003.

== Parodies ==
ITN has been spoofed several times on ITV's The Benny Hill Show, namely in one 1971 show with the logo reading "NIT" instead of "ITN" and with Hill as Reginald "Boozenquet" and Andrew Gardner.

ITN was also spoofed in a sketch in 1978 with Benny Hill as Angela O'Rippon, a parody of Angela Rippon, and as Ann Afford, a parody of Anna Ford. It was also spoofed in a black and white 1971 show and a 1973 episode.

== See also ==
- List of ITV journalists and newsreaders
- Independent Radio News
