= Timeline of television in London =

This is a timeline of television in London.

== 1950s ==
- 1954
  - 30 July – The Television Act 1954 paves the way for the launch of commercial television in the UK.
  - 26 October – The Independent Television Authority (ITA) awards the first franchises which include weekday and weekend franchises for London. The weekday franchise is awarded to Associated-Rediffusion (weekdays) with the weekend franchise given to Associated Television.
- 1955
  - 22 September – At 7:15pm, ITV goes on air for the first time when Associated-Rediffusion starts broadcasting.
  - 24 September – Associated Television (ATV London) broadcasts for the first time.
- 1956
  - 28 March – The Crystal Palace transmitting station replaces the transmitter at Alexandra Palace, from which the BBC had started the world's first scheduled television service in November 1936.
- 1957 to 1959
  - No events.

== 1960s ==
- 1960 to 1963
  - No events.
- 1964
  - 6 April – The name Associated-Rediffusion is dropped in favour of Rediffusion London, to reflect the cultural changes of the time and output altered accordingly.
  - 21 April – BBC Two launches and at first is only available in London meaning that the Crystal Palace transmitting station becomes the UK's first transmitter to broadcast in 625 lines.
- 1965
  - No events.
- 1966
  - No events.
- 1967
  - October – The Independent Television Authority announces that there is no place for Rediffusion in the redrawn franchise pattern. ABPC, the parent company of ABC and BET, the parent company of Rediffusion, created Thames as a separate entity. Rediffusion's parent company, BET, takes a 49% stake in Thames, and was under-represented in the management of the new company – a state of affairs to which Rediffusion strongly objected. The ITA replied that either Thames or ABC takeover. Rediffusion chose Thames.
  - London Weekend Television (LWT) is awarded the London weekend franchise. The new franchise includes Friday evenings so LWT broadcasts from 7pm on Fridays as well as Saturday and Sunday.
- 1968
  - 29 July – Rediffusion London's last night on air.
  - 30 July – Thames Television starts broadcasting.
  - 2 August – LWT goes on air, for fifteen seconds because this day is the start of the technicians strike which forces ITV off the air for several weeks although management manage to launch a temporary ITV Emergency National Service with no regional variations.
  - 25 August – LWT airs the first edition of regional football highlights programme The Big Match.
- 1969
  - 9 September – The first edition of teatime news magazine Nationwide is broadcast. The regional news magazines are incorporated into the new show with the London opt-out presented by the Nationwide presenters. Nationwide is not initially broadcast every weekday so on Mondays and later also on Fridays, London This Week which had been on air for a while, is broadcast. Town and Around which had served as a news magazine for viewers in London and the south east, ends.
  - 15 November – LWT begins broadcasting in colour.
  - 17 November – Thames begins broadcasting in colour.

== 1970s ==
- 1970
  - 18 September – LWT launches its famous river ident.
- 1971
  - No events.
- 1972
  - 25 August – Prior to the BBC's teatime news magazine Nationwide being extended to broadcast every weekday evening, London This Week is broadcast for the final time.
  - 16 October – Following a law change which removed all restrictions on broadcasting hours, Thames launches a full afternoon service.
  - LWT opens its purpose-built studios called The London Studios although they were not fully operational until 1974.
- 1973
  - No events.
- 1974
  - The Independent Broadcasting Authority (IBA) automatically extends all ITV franchise contracts from 1974 to 1981, owing to the enormous costs of introducing colour television.
- 1975
  - No events.
- 1976
  - No events.
- 1977
  - May – A strike occurs at Thames when production assistants refuse to operate new video equipment. Thames proceeded to sack all the technicians for breach of contract. The following month, both sides backed down over the issues, with all technicians returning to work.
  - 12 September – Today is replaced by a more conventional news magazine Thames at Six.
- 1978
  - 5 September – Thames launches a lunchtime regional news bulletin.
- 1979
  - 10 August – The ten week ITV strike forces Thames and LWT off the air. The strike ends on 24 October. The strike had begun four days earlier at Thames.
  - Thames News at Six is renamed Thames News.

== 1980s ==
- 1980
  - 28 April – A late night Thames News bulletin is launched. It had originally been planned to launch at the same time as the lunchtime bulletin but was delayed due to union problems.
- 1981
  - 7 September – The BBC launches a new weekday lunchtime news bulletin called News After Noon. After 25 minutes the regions left the programme for a lunchtime regional news bulletin. However, BBC South East did not broadcast regional news bulletins in 1981 so News After Noon continued in London and the south east, providing a financial report and a recap of the news headlines with in-vision subtitles.
- 1982
  - 1 January – The new arrangements for ITV sees LWT gain 105 minutes more transmission time on Fridays when the handover from Thames is moved back from 7pm to 5:15pm.
  - 4 January – The BBC's teatime news programme for London and the South East is rebranded as Nationwide - South East at Six. It had previously been billed as Nationwide (London and South East) and the renamed bulletin continues to be presented by that day's Nationwide presenters.
  - 8 January – Due to the earlier Friday start, LWT becomes contractually responsible for providing a Friday London news service. Rather than launch its own news service, LWT pays Thames to provide a 15-minute insert into The Six O'Clock Show, LWT's Friday teatime magazine. The bulletin is called Thames Weekend News. Over the weekend, LWT's news coverage consists of LWT News Headlines which are aired mid-afternoon and late evening. These bulletins usually consisted solely of the duty continuity announcer in-vision reading copy sourced from the Independent Local Radio station LBC and later, from local wire agencies.
  - After 26 years of being inactive, the Alexandra Palace transmitter is brought back into service as a relay transmitter to improve reception in parts of north London.
- 1983
  - 17 January – Breakfast Time, Britain's first breakfast show, launches on BBC1. The new service includes four opt-outs for regional news. The regional news summaries for London and the south east are read by that day's Breakfast Time presenters. This is the first time that the region has had any local news coverage outside of the teatime news magazine.
  - 1 February – Following the launch of ITV's breakfast television service, TV-am, Thames and LWT's broadcast day now begins at 9:25am.
  - 24 October – The BBC launches a new teatime magazine show Sixty Minutes. As had been the case with its predecessor Nationwide, the regional news magazines are incorporated into the new show and the London opt-out is presented by that day's Sixty Minutes presenters.
  - LWT launches an into-the-night Nightlife strand, resulting in LWT staying on air until around 2am on Friday and Saturday nights.
- 1984
  - 27 August – The first of two strikes at Thames over new shift patterns takes place. It is resolved on 3 September.
  - 3 September – Following the cancellation of Sixty Minutes, the teatime regional magazines become programmes in their own right and the BBC launches a new programme for London and south east called BBC London Plus. The new programme has its own dedicated team of presenters.
  - 17 October – Another strike begins at Thames over the same issue, and also over new technologies. By the 3rd day a management-operated schedule had been introduced.
  - 3 November – The strike finally ends, after 62 film editors agreed to the new conditions, while the ACTT agreed as well to start negotiations about the introductions of new technology. Additional episodes of network productions were screened to help clear the backlog.
- 1985
  - 3 January – The last day of transmission using the 405-lines system.
  - May–June – LWT's flagship Friday evening news magazine The Six O'Clock Show is briefly extended to Saturdays. However, only six episodes are broadcast.
  - September – London and the south east finally gets the same level of regional news coverage from the BBC as the rest of the UK. Previously, the BBC had broadcast non-regional programming during the regional news bulletins - financial news at lunchtime, an interval during the mid-afternoon regional news and a national sports round-up, called Today’s Sport, at Saturday teatime.
- 1986
  - No events.
- 1987
  - 1 June – Thames launches Thames Into the Night, broadcasting until around 4am.
  - 17 August – Thames begins 24-hour transmissions.
  - 28 August – LWT begins 24-hour transmissions.
  - 7 September – Following the transfer of ITV Schools to Channel 4, ITV provides a full morning programme schedule, with advertising, for the first time. The new service includes regular five-minute national and regional news bulletins.
  - December – Thames Weekend News is broadcast for the final time.
- 1988
  - 8 January – Following concern from the IBA over LWT’s regional news output, LWT launches its own news service called LWT News. The service is outsourced and is provided by Screen News.
  - 15 July – The Six O'Clock Show is broadcast for the final time.
  - 7 October – The Six O'Clock Show's replacement programme, Friday Now!, launches.
- 1989
  - 28 March – BBC Newsroom South East replaces BBC London Plus as the BBC's regional news programme.
  - 28 July – Friday Now is broadcast for the final time. It is axed due to poor ratings.
  - 1 September – LWT's replacement for Friday Now, Six O'Clock Live, launches.
  - 11 September – NICAM stereo broadcasting begins on ITV and Channel 4 from the Crystal Palace transmitter.

== 1990s ==
- 1990
  - January – Chrysalis Television takes over the contract to produce LWT News.
  - 9 December – Hellenic TV launches, providing London's Greek community with its own television service.
- 1991
  - April – Thames and LWT launch a new overnight strand ITV Night Time.
  - 16 October – Thames loses its ITV licence to Carlton Television due to it not being the highest bidder. LWT retains its licence. There had been one other applicants, London Independent Broadcasting but it was ruled out because it failed to make the quality threshold. It had bid five times more than LWT, which retains the licence with a bid of £7.59 million.
- 1992
  - LWT and new franchisee Carlton create a 50/50 joint venture called London News Network to provide both franchisees with news and non-news regional programmes.
  - 21 August – LWT axes Six O’Clock Live to make way for the forthcoming London Tonight.
  - 31 December – At 11:59 pm Thames stops broadcasting as after the chimes of Big Ben, the new licensee, Carlton Television takes over as franchise holder for London weekdays.
- 1993
  - 1 January – At midnight, Carlton Television begins broadcasting.
  - 3 January – LWT News is broadcast for the final time.
  - 4 January –
    - Following the launch of GMTV, news bulletins for London are seen on ITV at breakfast for the first time.
    - London Tonight launches as the new news service for both Carlton and LWT.
- 1994
  - November – Associated Newspapers launches a rolling news service for London called Channel One. It is only available on cable and only in some areas.
- 1995
  - No events.
- 1996
  - 25 November – London Today, a 30-minute lunchtime edition of London Tonight. is launched.
- 1997
  - No events.
- 1998
  - 25 September – After less than four years on air, Channel One closes at 6pm.
  - 15 November – Digital terrestrial television in the United Kingdom begins broadcasting.
- 1999
  - No events.

== 2000s ==
- 2000
  - No events.
- 2001
  - September – The weekday 30-minute regional news programme London Today is broadcast on Carlton for the final time.
  - 1 October – A major reorganisation of the BBC's regional news coverage in the south east sees the launch of BBC London and the first bulletin of a new London-only news service called BBC London News.
- 2002
  - 28 October – The remaining two ITV companies in England, Carlton and Granada, decide to drop all regional identities and replace them with a single ITV1 branding and LWT marks its final day on air with a series of tributes to LWT's past. When GMTV handed over to the weekday franchise the following morning, the national ITV1 brand was on-air.
- 2003
  - No events.
- 2004
  - 2 February – Granada officially purchases Carlton Communications and renames itself ITV plc which is a single England and Wales ITV company. ITV London is formed as a unified brand for the Carlton and LWT franchises. Consequently, the new ‘region’ operates as a seven-day service.
  - 29 February – The production of London Tonight transfers to ITN.
- 2005
  - No events.
- 2006
  - No events.
- 2007
  - No events.
- 2008
  - December – All non-news local programming on ITV London ends after Ofcom gives ITV permission to drastically cut back its regional programming. From 2009 the only regional programme is the monthly political discussion show.
- 2009
  - 2 December – HDTV broadcasts begin from the Crystal Palace transmitting station.

== 2010s ==
- 2010
  - No events.
- 2011
  - No events.
- 2012
  - 18 April – Digital switchover in London is completed.
- 2013
  - 14 January – London Tonight is renamed as ITV News London.
  - 28 January – ITV plc buys the freehold of The London Studios, now renamed London Television Centre, for £56 million from what had become Coal Pension Properties.
  - February – Ofcom announces that ESTV has been awarded the licence to provide a local television channel for London. The channel will be called London Live.
- 2014
  - 31 March – At 6:30pm, London Live begins broadcasting.
- 2015
  - No events.
- 2016
  - April – Ofcom gives London Live permission to reduce the amount of local shows that it has to broadcast at peak time to one hour per day.
- 2017
  - No events.
- 2018
  - 30 April – ITV closes The London Studios.
- 2019
  - No events.

== 2020s ==
- 2020
  - 25 March – BBC London and South East launches as a pan-regional weekday lunchtime television news bulletin which covers the London and South East regions. The programme was produced and broadcast live from the BBC's South East Regional Production Centre in Royal Tunbridge Wells. All other local news bulletins remain as separate for the two regions. The decision to merge the two programmes was due to the ongoing COVID-19 pandemic in the United Kingdom and to allow fewer studios to be needed for broadcasting. Combined breakfast bulletins had been broadcast during BBC Breakfast beforehand but these were dropped following the decision to temporarily remove local news bulletins during Breakfast due to the COVID-19 pandemic.
  - 4 September – The final regular edition of BBC London and South East is broadcast. After this date the localised lunchtime bulletins return.
- 2021
  - BBC London and South East returns on three occasions - for the week beginning 23 January 2021 due to staff shortages at BBC London, and on 17 July and on 20 and 27 December, again due to staff shortages.

== See also ==
- Timeline of Thames Television
- Timeline of London Weekend Television
- Timeline of Carlton Television
