= Timeline of regional news on ITV =

This is a timeline of the history of regional news on the British television network ITV.

== 1950s ==
- 1955
  - 22 September – The first news bulletin is broadcast at 10pm on ITV's launch night.
- 1956
  - 17 February – ITV begins broadcasting in the Midlands - ATV Midlands launches ITV in the Midlands and the following day the Midlands’ weekend contractor ABC Weekend TV broadcasts for the first time.
  - 3 May – Granada Television launches ITV across the north of England.
  - 7 May – The first broadcast of ATV Midlands News takes place. It is a short daily summary of regional news with stories often sourced directly from the Birmingham Evening Despatch, a local newspaper. Film footage is later added with footage shot by Birmingham Commercial Films. It was not until 1959 that ATV set up its own film unit for its regional news service.
- 1957
  - 31 August – ITV starts broadcasting in central Scotland – Scottish Television (STV) is the franchise holder.
- 1958
  - 14 January – Television Wales and the West (TWW) starts broadcasting to South Wales and the West of England.
  - 30 August – Southern Television launches.
- 1959
  - 15 January – Tyne Tees Television launches.
  - 8 October – ITV broadcasts its first election results programme to provide ITV with live coverage of the results of the 1959 United Kingdom general election.
  - 27 October – Anglia Television launches, bringing ITV to east England.
  - 31 October – ITV launches in Northern Ireland when Ulster Television starts broadcasting.

== 1960s ==
- 1960
  - 31 January – Southern Television's broadcast area expands when it begins broadcasting to Kent and East Sussex following the Independent Television Authority granting Southern the right to broadcast to South East England.
  - 2 June – About Anglia launches as a twice-weekly programme accompanying the 10-minute regional evening news bulletin on weekdays. Its success prompted it to be extended to four nights a week the following September and then, every weeknight.
- 1961
  - Southern opens studios in Dover and launches localised news opt-outs for the east of the region, becoming the first broadcaster in the UK provide such a service.
  - 4 April – Southern launches a weeknight 30-minute regional news programme called Day By Day.
  - 29 April – Westward Television launches, bring ITV to south west England.
  - 1 September – Border Television launches and the opening day sees Border broadcast the first edition of its regional news magazine Lookaround.
  - 30 September – Grampian Television launches.
- 1962
  - 1 September – Channel Television launches.
  - 14 September – The final part of the UK gets an ITV service when Wales (West and North) Television launches in West and North Wales as Teledu Cymru.
- 1963
  - No events.
- 1964
  - 26 January – Wales (West and North) Television stops broadcasting after going bankrupt. It is replaced by TWW. However the Teledu Cymru on-air identity is retained.
  - 30 March – Tyne Tees introduces a nightly regional news programme called North East Newsview. Previously, regional news had consisted of short bulletins and a weekly Friday night programme called North East Roundabout.
  - 5 October – Following pressure from the Independent Television Authority to improve regional coverage, ATV introduces a nightly news magazine programme, ATV Today. It runs for 20 minutes and follows the teatime 15 minute-long ATV Midlands News bulletin. Later ATV Today is later expanded to the full 30 minutes and the news bulletin is subsumed into the main programme.
  - 9 October – Southern launches a weekly news magazine for South East England called Friday on Ten. This is shown instead of the Friday edition of regional news magazine Day by Day.
  - Newsview replaces Roundabout as Ulster's regional news programme.
- 1965
  - 26 March – Border Television begins broadcasting to the Isle of Man.
- 1966
  - No events.
- 1967
  - No events.
- 1968
  - 4 March – TWW stops broadcasting five months before its contract was due to expire. The ITA provides an interim service called Independent Television Service for Wales and the West until 20 May when the new contractor, Harlech Television, takes over. The change in contractor the launch of a full half-hour evening news programme, Y Dydd (The Day) in Welsh and Report Wales in English, broadcast to south Wales and the West of England. Previously, TWW had provided short evening bulletins known as TWW Reports, presented jointly from studios in Cardiff and Bristol, where the station ran a joint news operation covering the two areas.
  - 29 July –
    - ATV starts broadcasting to the Midlands seven days a week and Granada starts broadcasting across the north west seven days a week. In both cases ABC loses the right to broadcast.
    - Yorkshire Television launches following the decision to split the north region into two resulting in a new franchise being created for the Yorkshire area. The new contractor launches its own news operation under the title of Calendar .
  - 30 July – Thames Television replaces Associated-Rediffusion as the holder of the London weekday franchise.
  - 2 August — London Weekend Television (LWT) replaces ATV as London's weekend franchisee.
- 1969
  - Tyne Tees’ regional news programme is renamed Today at Six.
  - UTV Reports replaces Roundabout as Ulster's regional news programme.

== 1970s ==
- 1970
  - June – A separate HTV West service is launched, as is a full evening news programme for the region called Report West.
- 1971
  - No events.
- 1972
  - 11 September – Scottish television launches Scotland Today, although the programme is only broadcast for ten months each year. Magazine programmes are shown during the summer break.
- 1973
  - Granada's nightly news programme is relaunched as Granada Reports. The nightly news programme had previously had various titles, including Northern Newscast, Scene at Six Thirty, Newsview and People and Places.
- 1974
  - No events.
- 1975
  - No events.
- 1976
  - 6 September – Northern Life replaces Today at Six as Tyne Tees’ regional news programme.
- 1977
  - Due to the popularity of weekly magazine programme Scene South East, Southern launches Scene Midweek. This replaces part two of the Wednesday edition of Day by Day.
  - 5 September – Thames launches a lunchtime regional news bulletin.
  - 12 September – Thames Television axes Today and replaces it with a more conventional news magazine Thames at Six.
- 1978
  - Grampian Television becomes the first British television station to adopt ENG video cameras for news coverage - a move which finally allows its regional news programme, Grampian Today, to extend from three to five nights a week.
  - Scotland Today’s annual summer break is scrapped and consequently the programme is now on air all year round.
- 1979
  - Thames News at Six is renamed Thames News.
  - Good Evening Ulster replaces UTV Reports/Reports as Ulster’s regional news programme. It becomes the UK's first hour-long regional news programme.

== 1980s ==
- 1980
  - 7 January – Grampian Today is relaunched as North Tonight as part of an effort to reflect all of northern Scotland.
  - 28 April – A late night Thames News bulletin is launched. It had originally been planned to launch at the same time as the lunchtime bulletin but was delayed due to union problems.
- 1981
  - 31 December – ATV, Southern and Westward stop broadcasting at the end of their day's programming and the day sees the final editions of the three companies’ regional news programmes - ATV Today, Day By Day and Westward Diary are broadcast for the final time.
- 1982
  - 1 January –
    - Central, TVS and TSW start broadcasting.
    - TVS broadcasts the first main edition of its new regional news magazine Coast to Coast At first, the programme airs between 5:30pm & 6:30pm, consisting of two sub-regional segments at 5:30pm & 6:20pm, ITN's News at 545 bulletin and a pan-regional segment at 6pm.
  - 8 January – Due to the earlier Friday start time for LWT, LWT becomes contractually responsible for providing a Friday London news service. Rather than launch its own news service, LWT pays Thames to provide a 15-minute insert into The Six O'Clock Show, LWT's Friday teatime magazine. The bulletin is called Thames Weekend News. Over the weekend, LWT's news coverage consists of LWT News Headlines, which are aired mid-afternoon and late evening. These bulletins usually consisted solely of the duty continuity announcer in-vision reading copy sourced from the Independent Local Radio station LBC, and later, from local wire agencies.
  - Spring – The main evening edition of Coast to Coast is cut to a single 30 minute programme, beginning at 6pm. The change also sees the launch of fully separate editions for the south and south east.
  - Report West is renamed HTV News.
  - 31 October – Programmes in Welsh, including news bulletins, are broadcast on HTV for the final time as from the following day, all Welsh language programmes both on BBC Wales and HTV transfers to the new Welsh fourth channel S4C.
  - 1 November – Following the launch of S4C, HTV Wales becomes a fully English language service and it renames its news programme to Wales at Six.
- 1983
  - September – Central finally launches its East Midlands service. An industrial dispute had prevented Central from launching its East Midlands service until 21 months after Central actually launched.
- 1984
  - 8 October – Scotland Today is relaunched as a features-led magazine format with the news relegated to brief summaries before and after the programme.
- 1985
  - No events.
- 1986
  - 20 October – Following considerable criticism, including from the Independent Broadcasting Authority, the 1984 changes introduced by Scottish Television to Scotland Today are reversed and the programme once again becomes a news bulletin with the feature elements transferred to a new lunchtime programme called Live at One Thirty.
- 1987
  - 20 July – The lunchtime news programme moves to 12:30pm and the regional news bulletins are moved accordingly, to 12:50pm.
  - 7 September –
    - ITV launches a full morning programme schedule, with advertising, for the first time. The new service includes hourly five-minute national and regional news bulletins.
    - Ulster's evening news magazine programme is renamed Six Tonight.
  - December – Thames Weekend News is broadcast by LWT on Friday evenings for the final time.
  - TSW changes the name of its regional news programme from Today South West to Today.
- 1988
  - 8 January – Following concern from the IBA over LWT's regional news output, LWT launches its own news service called LWT News. The service is outsourced and is provided by Screen News until the start of 1990 when Chrysalis takes over the contract.
  - Grampian launches weekend regional news bulletins and at the same time, all of Grampian's news bulletins are renamed as Grampian Headlines.
  - 7 March – The lunchtime news returns to the 1pm slot with regional bulletins moving to 1.20pm.
  - 5 June – For the first time, regional news bulletins are broadcast on Yorkshire Television at the weekend. Two bulletins are aired at the weekend, after the lunchtime and teatime ITN News bulletins.
  - 12 December – TVS launches a new sub-region, providing viewers in Berkshire and north Hampshire, who are served by the Hannington transmitting station with a more localised news service as an opt-out from regional news magazine programme Coast to Coast.
- 1989
  - 9 January – Central launches a third sub-region – Central South. It covers Oxfordshire, Gloucestershire, Herefordshire and parts of Northamptonshire, Buckinghamshire and Wiltshire. These areas were previously served by the Central West sub-region.
  - Border begins providing a sub-regional service for Scottish Borders viewers served by the Selkirk transmitter, consisting of a short opt-out during Lookaround each weeknight.
  - TSW renames its news programme from Today to TSW Today.
  - 20–24 November – TVS pilots a 30-minute late night edition of Coast to Coast, entitled Coast to Coast Late. The pilot runs for a single week and is not taken up.

== 1990s ==
- 1990
  - 2 January – Granada Television's nightly news programme Granada Reports is rebranded as Granada Tonight and the shorter bulletins are rebranded as Granada News.
  - 9 July – About Anglia ends and is replaced by Anglia News. The change sees Anglia produce two separate news services - East (Norfolk, Suffolk and Essex), and West (Cambridgeshire, Northamptonshire, Bedfordshire, northern Hertfordshire, northern Buckinghamshire, southern Lincolnshire, southern Rutland and a small part of southern Leicestershire).
  - 24 September – Yorkshire launches a third a third sub-regional opt-out for South Yorkshire and north Derbyshire.
- 1991
  - 7 January – The lunchtime news returns to the 12:30pm slot with regional lunchtime bulletins now broadcast before the programme at 12:20pm.
- 1992
  - 21 August – LWT's Friday night news magazine show Six O’Clock Live is axed to make way for the forthcoming London Tonight.
  - 5 October – Tyne Tees' regional news programme Northern Life is replaced by Tyne Tees Today.
  - 31 December – Thames, TVS and TSW broadcast for the final time. Consequently, the companies’ regional news programmes - Thames News, TSW Today and Coast to Coast - are seen for the final time.
- 1993
  - 1 January – At the stroke of midnight, Carlton, Meridian and Westcountry start broadcasting and at 6am GMTV goes on air for the first time. Also Teletext launches as ITV's new teletext service.
  - 3 January – LWT News is broadcast for the final time.
  - 4 January –
    - The first weekday edition of GMTV is broadcast and it sees the launch of regional news updates at breakfast on ITV.
    - London News Network goes on air, It is a joint venture between Carlton and LWT and it provides London with a seven days a week service. Previously, the two contractors had operated separate news services.
    - Ulster's news service is renamed UTV Live. The programme broadcasts for 60 minutes, instead of 30.
  - January – Scottish launches a 30-minute lunchtime edition of Scotland Today.
  - 31 March – Network North launches, providing the south of the region with its own regional news magazine. It is available to viewers served by the Bilsdale transmitter. Tyne Tees Today therefore becomes the name of the north of the region programme for those served by the Pontop Pike and Chatton transmitters.
- 1994
  - 28 February – Wales at Six is replaced by Wales Tonight.
- 1995
  - November – Tyne Tees Today and Network North are renamed Tyne Tees News although the separate news services for the North and South of the region continue as before.
- 1996
  - 2 September – Tyne Tees' two separate regional news magazines end and are replaced by a single news programme called North East Tonight.
  - 25 November – London Today, a 30-minute lunchtime edition of London Tonight is launched by Carlton Television.
- 1997
  - March – HTV West's main evening news programme is renamed The West Tonight. The change co-insides with the opening of a digital broadcast centre at HTV's Bristol studios.
  - 31 August – Television schedules are dominated by coverage of the Diana, Princess of Wales's car accident. ITV cancels its regular programmes to provide non-stop rolling coverage until mid-evening with a 30-minute regional bulletin broadcast at lunchtime.
- 1998
  - No events.
- 1999
  - 8 March –
    - Major changes to ITV's news programmes take place, including different times for the channel's news programmes and the programmes were referred to as ITV News rather than ITN News. The main bulletin of the day is now considered to be the Early Evening News and is moved from 5:40pm to 6:30pm and the evening news is controversially pushed back to 11pm although the following year the ITC forces ITV to move the late evening news back to 10pm on three nights each week with the late evening regional news now broadcast at 11:20pm.
    - Wales Tonight is renamed HTV Wales News.
    - Ulster's UTV Live is brought forward by half an hour to start at 5:30pm. The first half-hour sees feature reports, light-hearted stories and the weather forecast branded as part of a separate programme, UTV Life, which ran before the main evening news, started at 6pm and kept the UTV Live name.
  - April – Border's sub-regional service for Scottish Borders viewers served by the Selkirk transmitter, consisting of a short opt-out during Lookaround each weeknight, is extended to cover Dumfries and Galloway and a dedicated Scottish news bulletin is introduced on weekday lunchtimes.

== 2000s ==
- 2000
  - No events.
- 2001
  - September – London Today is broadcast for the final time.
  - 28 September – Granada Television's flagship nightly news programme Granada Tonight is rebranded to its original title Granada Reports.
- 2002
  - Grampian Headlines is renamed Grampian News.
- 2003
  - September – Anglia News is renamed Anglia News Tonight and on 2 February 2004 the programme is renamed Anglia Tonight.
- 2004
  - 2 February –
    - After several years of inconsistent scheduling of ITV's late evening news, the bulletin moves to a five nights a week 10:30pm start time with the regional news bulletin retimed accordingly.
    - HTV News is renamed ITV Wales News and ITV West News respectively.
  - March – Following its acquisition of the London News Network, a company previously owned by the now merged Carlton and Granada, ITN begins producing local news bulletins for the ITV London region.
- 2005
  - 11 April – The 15-minute regional news bulletins at 3:00pm are axed and incorporated into a new 60-minute ITV Lunchtime News.
  - August – North East Tonight becomes two separate programmes for the north and the south of the region. However all other regions news bulletins remain as a single pan-regional bulletin.
  - 12 September – HTV West's regional news programme is once again named The West Tonight, six years after the name had originally been dropped.
  - 14 November — ITV Wales News is renamed back to Wales Tonight.
- 2006
  - 4 September – The ITV Lunchtime News reverts to being a 30-minute programme and its start time is moved back to 1:30pm. Regional news is now broadcast at 1:55pm.
  - 4 December – The South Midlands sub-region is disbanded. The parts of Gloucestershire served by Central South join the majority of the county already covered by ITV West and begin receiving The West Tonight broadcast from Bristol, Herefordshire was now covered by the West Midlands edition from Birmingham and in the rest of the region (Buckinghamshire, Oxfordshire and the Swindon area), news operations are merged with Meridian West, to form the non-franchise ITV Thames Valley service, broadcasting Thames Valley Today/Tonight from the existing Meridian West studio in Whiteley, Hampshire.
- 2007
  - 8 January –
    - The Calendar East and Calendar South regions are merged to form a new Calendar South region covering central and east Lincolnshire, east and south east Yorkshire, east Nottinghamshire and north Norfolk. The Calendar North region, broadcasting from the Emley Moor transmitter continues as before.
    - Viewers of North Tonight begin to receive two different programmes - those in the Dundee, Angus, Perthshire and north-east Fife area receive a dedicated bulletin within the main North Tonight programme.
    - STV launches separate news services for the East and West of the STV Central region, initially as a five-minute opt out within the 6pm edition of Scotland Today on weeknights.
  - February – UTV Live and UTV Life are split into separate programmes and all bulletins outside of the main early evening programme are retitled UTV News. This continues until April 2009.
- 2008
  - 14 January – ITV News at Ten returns to the schedules on four nights each week – the Friday edition remains at 11pm. The timing of the late evening regional news bulletins is adjusted accordingly.
- 2009
  - 13 February – The final North and South sub-regional editions of North East Tonight are broadcast on Tyne Tees.
  - 15 February – Westcountry Live is broadcast for the final time.
  - 16 February – As part of cutbacks across ITV to its regional broadcasts in England the operations of ITV Westcountry and ITV West are merged into a new non-franchise region ITV West & Westcountry. The new ‘region’ results in a merged regional news service based in Bristol called The West Country Tonight. However the first half of the main programme and the entirety of the late evening bulletin remain separate.
  - 25 February –
    - ITV makes major cutbacks to its regional broadcasts in England. The separate sub-regional news programmes are merged into a pan-regional programme although more localised news continues to be broadcast as a brief opt-out during the early evening programme. Also axed are the weekday mid-morning bulletins and the lunchtime bulletins at weekends.
    - The changes also see the merger of the Border and Tyne Tees regions to form ITV Tyne Tees & Border. Lookaround is no longer broadcast from Carlisle, instead it is transferred to the studios of Tyne Tees in Gateshead. The North East Tonight and Lookaround titles are retained for the 6pm programme and late bulletin each weekday, whilst shorter bulletins are known simply as Tyne Tees & Border News.
  - February – Mid-morning weekday and lunchtime weekend UTV Live bulletins are axed when the station is permitted to reduce their weekly news output from five hours and twenty minutes to four hours.
  - 20 March – The last main editions of North Tonight and Scotland Today arew aired ahead of a major revamp of STV's news coverage in Scotland.
  - 23 March – STV News at Six launches across Scotland, replacing the Scotland Today and North Tonight brands. The bulletins remain fully localised although sub-regional inserts are now just five minute opt-outs.
  - 27 April – UTV launches a 30-minute late evening news and current affairs programme, UTV Live Tonight, which follows the News at Ten on Monday – Thursday nights and incorporates the station's late news bulletin alongside extended political and business coverage.
  - 15 July – Coverage of the Isle of Man is transferred from Border to Granada.

== 2010s ==
- 2010
  - No events.
- 2011
  - May – Separate half-hour editions of STV News at Six for the East and West are launched along with localised late night news bulletins each weeknight.
  - 5 September – Separate weekday daytime bulletins for the west and south west of England are reintroduced.
  - 24 October – STV launches a 30-minute late evening news and current affairs programme, Scotland Tonight, which follows News at Ten on Monday – Thursday nights and incorporates the station's late news bulletins for Central and Northern Scotland, alongside extended political and business coverage.
- 2012
  - No events.
- 2013
  - 14 January –
    - Regional news services are rebranded with the ITV name - for example, Anglia Tonight is renamed ITV News Anglia.
    - The Tyne Tees news service is rebranded as ITV News Tyne Tees and pan-regional bulletins are branded as ITV News Tyne Tees & Border.
  - 16 September – Sub-regional news coverage is reintroduced across England. The weekday daytime, late evening and weekend bulletins as well as 20 minutes of the 6pm programme are once again more localised. Lookaround and ITV News Tyne Tees are restored as fully separate regional programmes on weekdays with shorter daytime and weekend bulletins reintroduced. Both programmes continue to be broadcast from Tyne Tees' Gateshead studios with extra journalists recruited for newsgathering in the Border region.
- 2014
  - 30 June – The Wales at Six name for ITV Cymru Wales' flagship 6pm news bulletin is reintroduced after 20 years.
- 2015
  - No events.
- 2016
  - 29 September – The 30-minute long UTV Live Tonight is axed and replaced by a shorter ten-minute bulletin.
- 2017
  - No events.
- 2018
  - 7 September – The Edinburgh edition of STV News at Six ends and is replaced on the 10th by shorter opt-outs within a newly formatted Central Scotland programme, duel-presented from Glasgow and Edinburgh.
- 2019
  - No events.

== 2020s ==
- 2020
  - March – Regional news programmes are affected by the COVID-19 pandemic. Sub-regional services are also impacted, running times of all short bulletins are reduced and the main 6pm programmes are fronted by a single presenter instead of two.
- 2021
  - No events.
- 2022
  - No events.
- 2023
  - No events.
- 2024
  - No events.
- 2025
  - 25 September – STV announces that it will seek permission from Ofcom to merge its two regional news services and axe its sub-regional opt-outs. If approved, separate news programmes for the North and Central areas would be replaced with a pan-regional programme covering both STV licence areas from Glasgow, with the Aberdeen studios closing.
- 2026
  - 5 January – As part of cost-cutting measures, ITV News London begins broadcasting from a refreshed studio, shared with the Good Morning Britain set.
  - 13 April – To coincide with the new, standard ITV News studio, ITV News West Country has a new studio in Bristol.

== See also ==
- Timeline of ITV
- Timeline of ITV News
- Timeline of ITN
