= Anna Maria Ashe =

British newsreader and television presenter

Anna Maria Ashe (born August 1953) is a British television presenter, best known as a newsreader for the local news programme, London Tonight.

== Announcing and newsreading in Scotland ==
Anna began her career at Grampian Television in 1983 as a continuity announcer and newsreader for the station's short local news bulletins, North News (lunchtime) and North Headlines (late night). After a short stint announcing for Thames Television, Ashe joined BBC Scotland as an announcer and transmission director in 1986. During this time, she was also a presenter of Reporting Scotland's lunchtime news bulletins.

== From TVS announcing to LWT newsreading ==
Shortly afterwards, Ashe joined Television South in Southampton, again as a continuity announcer. When in-vision continuity was phased out at TVS, she joined the regional news programme Coast to Coast, initially as a newsreader for the South edition of the programme.

Before long, she moved to Maidstone, Kent and joined the South East edition of Coast to Coast as a main presenter, alongside Mike Debens.

In 1989, Ashe left TVS (she was replaced by Liz Wickham on Coast To Coast South East) and joined London Weekend Television to present LWT News bulletins as part of an attempt by the company to boost their local news service at weekends. She also presented news round-ups during LWT's magazine programme Six O' Clock Live, presented by Frank Bough.

== London Tonight ==
When LWT News ended days into January 1993, Anna joined the newly formed London News Network subsidiary of Carlton and LWT as a presenter of London Tonight. Anna also presented various regional programmes from the company including Summer Dream Ticket and Caring at Christmas. She stayed with LNN until the company was disbanded on Sunday 29 February 2004, after which, ITN took over production of the London news service. Anna Maria presented the last LNN-produced bulletin.

== After LNN ==
Anna now specialises in corporate & charity work and is an ambassador for The Prince's Trust.

She has also appeared in cameo roles as a newsreader in The Bill, Bad Girls, Prime Suspect, and Footballers' Wives.
