= Tricia Ingrams =

English journalist

- Born: Patricia Ann Geaney; 28 March 1946; Edgware, Middlesex, United Kingdom
- Died: 26 October 1996 (aged 50); London, United Kingdom
- Occupations: Journalist and broadcaster
- Known for: Reporter/presenter for Thames News

Tricia Ingrams (28 March 1946 – 26 October 1996) was a journalist and interviewer best known as a reporter and presenter of Thames Television's regional news programme Thames News.

She was born Patricia Ann Geaney in Edgware, Middlesex and was the eldest of four children to two Irish parents. When Ingrams was 18, her mother died suddenly and the children were orphaned.

== Career ==
She started her career in journalism as a writer for a local magazine produced by the grocery chain SPar and went on to write for IPC magazines and appear in the national tabloid newspaper The Sun as an Action Girl.

Ingrams switched to broadcasting and became a presenter for the United Biscuits Network, an industrial radio station which broadcast to United Biscuits factories across the UK. Then in 1973, she joined Capital Radio as a reporter and newsreader. A year later, Capital's in-house newsroom was closed down and she moved to LBC where she presented phone-in programmes and The Sunday Interview.

After helping to set up the now-defunct commercial radio station for Portsmouth, Radio Victory, Ingrams returned to London and became a long-serving presenter of Thames News, often found presenting alongside former ITN anchorman Andrew Gardner.

Ingrams left Thames when the station lost its franchise in December 1992 and worked at Anglia Television and British Sky Broadcasting for short periods before joining London News Radio (a short-lived replacement for LBC) as a presenter in 1994.

== Personal life ==
She was married in 1972 to Paul Ingrams, who met Tricia whilst they were both working at the United Biscuits Network. The marriage was dissolved thirteen years later.

On 26 October 1996, Tricia Ingrams died in London at the age of 50 from cancer.
