= BBC London and South East =

British television news bulletin

Production
- Producer: BBC South East
- Production locations: Great Hall Studios, Royal Tunbridge Wells
- Running time: 15 minutes

Original release
- Network: BBC One London; BBC One South East
- Release: 25 March 2020 – present

Related
- BBC South East Today; BBC London News; ITV News Meridian; ITV News London

BBC London and South East was a pan-regional weekday lunchtime television news bulletin which was broadcast on BBC One in the London and South East regions between March and September 2020. The programme was produced and broadcast live from the BBC's South East Regional Production Centre in Royal Tunbridge Wells. All other local news bulletins remained separate for the two regions.

The decision to merge the two programmes was due to the ongoing COVID-19 pandemic in the United Kingdom and to allow fewer studios to be needed for broadcasting.

The lunchtime bulletin was first broadcast on 25 March 2020. Combined breakfast bulletins had been broadcast during BBC Breakfast beforehand but these were dropped following the decision to temporarily remove local news bulletins during Breakfast due to the COVID-19 pandemic.

The final regular edition was broadcast on 4 September 2020. After this date the lunchtime bulletins returned to BBC London News and South East Today.

On 23 January 2021, the edition briefly returned for a week due to staff shortages at BBC London.

On 17 July 2021, the edition returned once again, and later returned once more on 20 December 2021, and on 27 December 2021, the programme joined with South Today to create BBC London, South and South East Today due to staffing issues over the 2021 Christmas holidays.

Since then, there have been several instances where BBC London bulletins on BBC Breakfast have been replaced by BBC South East Today bulletins. On 11-12 August 2025, BBC London suffered a technical fault, resulting in the bulletins being replaced temporarily by South East Today bulletins.

== See also ==
- BBC London News
- South East Today
- Newsroom South East
