= Fred Housego =

British broadcaster

Fred Housego (born 25 October 1944) is a former London taxi driver and tour guide who became a television and radio personality and presenter after winning the BBC television quiz Mastermind in 1980. Notwithstanding his fame and success, he retained his taxi licence upon commencing his media career and continued his taxi-driving career as late as 2007.

== Early life and career ==
Housego was born in Dundee, Scotland, and educated at Kynaston Comprehensive School, where he passed one GCE O-level, in British Constitution. In addition to driving a taxi he has worked as a messenger for an advertising agency, a postman and a registered London Tourist Board tour guide.

== Mastermind ==
In 1980 Housego won a series of Mastermind in front of 18 million viewers. In an interview with Bradley Walsh for Come on Down! The Game Show Story, he said that his knowledge came from being a London Tourist Board-registered tour guide.

In 1981 Housego took part in the international version of Mastermind in Sydney, Australia. He again used The Tower of London as his subject in the competition, having previously used it as his subject in the Mastermind final. He came fourth with 16 points.

== Television and radio ==
Housego's specialist subject in the final of Mastermind was 'The Tower of London'. Apart from Mastermind, his television appearances include Blankety Blank, The Pyramid Game, History on Your Doorstep, The Six O'Clock Show (on which he was a presenter) and This is Your Life.

However it is radio where Housego has spent most of his broadcasting career, and he became the host of an all-night radio phone-in show, in London, on LBC for many years during the 1990s. He also presented an LBC series about radio comedy during the same period. More recently he has been heard on BBC Radio 4 presenting a documentary and on various Radio 4 panel games and quizzes such as Who Goes There? (2000). He has also appeared on Start the Week and as a contestant on Round Britain Quiz on BBC Radio 4.

He was the 'phone a friend' of Angela Rippon on Who Wants to Be a Millionaire?. Housego was asked in which month St Crispin's Day was but chose April despite being born on St Crispin's Day, which is in October.

Housego was the Pye TV Personality of the Year in 1981 and spoke to the Oxford and Cambridge Unions. He is a keen West Ham United supporter and has made several appearances at the ground during half-time presenting awards.

== Personal life ==
Housego lives with his wife, Pat, in Pevensey Bay, East Sussex, England. In 2007 he was still working as a taxi driver. Housego suffers from diabetes and became overweight but by exercise and diet lost 6 stone (84 lb; 38 kg) in six months.

== Publication ==
Housego has written a book entitled London: a portrait of Britain's historic capital, which was published by Hamlyn in 1982.
