= ITV London =

On-air brand name

- Logo used since 2013

- Type: Region of television network
- Branding: ITV1
- Country: United Kingdom
- First air date: 28 October 2002; 24 years ago
- TV transmitters: Crystal Palace; Reigate
- Headquarters: White City Place, London
- Broadcast area: London and parts of South East England
- Owner: ITV plc
- Picture format: 1080i HDTV, downscaled to 16:9 576i for SDTV
- Affiliation: ITV
- Official website: www.itv.com/london
- Language: English
- Replaced: Carlton Television (Monday morning to Friday afternoon); London Weekend Television (Friday afternoon to Sunday evening)

ITV London is the on-air brand name used by ITV Broadcasting Limited for two broadcast franchises of ITV, formerly operated by Carlton Television (weekdays) and London Weekend Television (weekends) in the London ITV region. Its terrestrial digital signal is transmitted from Crystal Palace in the London Borough of Bromley.

== History ==
As part of a network-wide rebrand, ITV1 London was formed on 28 October 2002, as a unified on-air service provided to viewers for both the London weekday (Carlton) and London weekend (LWT) franchises, running on weekdays and weekends respectively. It replaced the unique branding used by both franchisees with a unified service, offering the same service and news all week round. Legally, both franchises remained separate, but they are run by the same operating board and from the same facilities. Both licences are now held by ITV Broadcasting Ltd, but the original two companies still legally existed as Carlton Television Ltd (since dissolved) and London Weekend Television Ltd. The latter company is, along with most other regional companies owned by ITV plc, listed on Companies House as a "Dormant company".

ITV London is also unique in that it supplies the network feed for the other franchises and is the sole alternative ITV region to Sky, Freesat and Virgin Media customers. This service, available on channels 973, 977 and 853 respectively, is so that audio description services, which are only carried on the London variant on these services, are readily available to all viewers. Other regional variants are available by manually searching, but London is the only region to be given an exclusive EPG slot.

== Studios ==
ITV London was based at The London Studios, on the south bank of the River Thames, the former home of London Weekend franchisee London Weekend Television. The centre was chosen due to both companies presence in the centre; Carlton having leased space within the facility, alongside GMTV, since 1993. The contracted news service London News Network was also based, produced and broadcast from the centre. The London Studios closed in 2018.

== Identity ==
The services' on-screen identity has been generic throughout its existence, and has used no on-screen branding to identify it as ITV London, with the exception of one junction after the launch of the 2003 network rebrand. Since launch, the region has seen the plain generic idents seen by the rest of the country, without any regional variance identifying it as London; the other regions at this time received a regional ident with the region name below the ITV1 logo. Any reference to the service being in London is made in the voiceover alone, or through the programme titles, such as London Tonight.

Some identity remained on the regional programming end boards however, as each company still produced programmes for the region: Carlton used a red and orange version of their star idents used prior to 2002 with the caption A Carlton Production, with For London added for regional programming, while LWT used a generic purple caption with their logo added into the background. The LWT logo was also laid out in a purple box clearly at the top, with the caption An LWT Production beneath and the Granada plc logo at the bottom. These endboards lasted until 2 February 2004, when ITV plc was formed and both regional captions were replaced by a generic ITV London logo and An ITV Production caption against a blue squared background. This was replaced in 2006 by a blue caption featuring the new ITV1 logo with the words "a production for" above it. In 2013, it was replaced by a white ITV News caption with the words "© ITN year", to align with ITN's and ITV plc's other national and regional news bulletins.

Since 1 November 2002, the only distinction between the two original regions on-screen is that local weather forecasts broadcast from Friday night to Sunday is branded as London Weekend Weather, and is sponsored by a different company to the weekday forecasts.

On 14 January 2013, the station's on-air identity was changed to ITV, along with all other ITV plc-owned franchises.

On 15 November 2022, the on-air identity was reverted to ITV1.

== Productions ==
ITV London itself doesn't make any programmes, as all network productions are produced or commissioned by ITV Studios, and all regional news programmes by London News Network, and later ITN. The News and Sport for the region continued to be provided by LNN until 1 March 2004, when ITN took over production of London Tonight, resulting in the move of the programme from The London Studios to ITN's headquarters at Gray's Inn Road. Other regional programmes continued to be produced for the region by the two legal franchises, Carlton and LWT, and the companies were accredited at the end of the production until 2004, when it was replaced by an ITV London caption for both companies following the ITV plc merger.

== See also ==
- Carlton Television
- London Weekend Television
- ITV (TV network)
- History of ITV
- Thames Television
- BBC London

ITV regional branding
Preceded by LWT	London (weekends); 1 November 2002 – present Franchise: ITV London (London weekend)	Current branding
Preceded by Carlton Television	London (weekdays); 28 October 2002 – present Franchise: ITV London (London weekday)	Current branding
