= LWT News =

- Genre: News, London (regional)
- Country of origin: United Kingdom

Production
- Production companies: in-house (1982–1987); Screen News (1988–1990); Chrysalis Television (1990–1993)

Original release
- Network: London Weekend Television

Related
- Thames Weekend News; London Tonight

LWT News is a regional news service provided by London Weekend Television, serving the Greater London area in various formats between January 1982 and 3 January 1993.

== History ==
On Friday 1 January 1982, LWT began extending its broadcasting hours on Friday evenings - taking over from the ITV London weekday franchise Thames Television at 5:15pm, rather than the previous start time of 7pm.

The Independent Broadcasting Authority's decision to award extended hours to LWT meant that the station became contractually responsible for providing the regional news programme on Friday evenings.

Prior to the franchise round, the regulator had warned that the winning London contractors were expected to provide an improved regional news service for the capital throughout the week. The Authority suggested that the two companies provide a jointly produced seven-day news service, but the idea was rejected by both Thames and LWT as unfeasible. The companies argued there would be little news to justify a full bulletin (as had been proven in other ITV regions).

LWT director of programmes, Michael Grade, described the proposal for a joint service as "impractical for various reasons" but insisted the company would provide regional news on all three days, irrespective of how it was achieved.

The company also claimed a lack of resources and cost reasons would prevent them from producing a service – despite the company employing around 90 journalists for its current affairs output, such as Weekend World and The London Programme.

Up until December 1981, Thames aired a Friday edition of its nightly Thames News programme at 6pm followed by a half-hour sports magazine show, Thames Sport. LWT believed Thames' regional output on Fridays – particularly, Thames Sport – was leaving them with a low viewing audience when it began transmissions at 7pm.

According to press reports at the time, Thames staff felt LWT's replacement for their Friday evening news would resemble more of a chat show and entertainment format, despite the company's success in local current affairs and social action programming.

In September 1981, LWT reached an agreement with Thames to provide 16 minutes of local news coverage on Friday evenings for a reported £500,000 a year, as part of their new light-hearted magazine programme, The Six O'Clock Show.

=== London News Headlines ===
Following the start of the new franchise period on 1 January 1982, LWT began broadcasting short London News Headlines bulletins, usually in mid-afternoon and late evening slots.

These bulletins usually consisted solely of the duty continuity announcer in-vision reading copy sourced from the Independent Local Radio station LBC, and later, from local wire agencies.

Regular newsreaders included Peter Lewis, Sue Peacock, Ruth Anders, Keith Harrison and Trish Bertram.

=== The Six O'Clock Show ===
The Six O'Clock Show titles

Rather than produce a conventional regional news programme on Fridays, LWT opted to air an hour-long local magazine show entitled The Six O'Clock Show, which was launched in January 1982 and presented by Michael Aspel with a team of various co-hosts and reporters including Danny Baker, Janet Street-Porter and Fred Housego.

The programme also included a fifteen-minute news bulletin produced by Thames Television titled Thames Weekend News until December 1987.

By the end of the first series, the programme had outperformed what Thames was offering in the same timeslot and for the rest of its run, The Six O'Clock Show became one of the most watched regional programmes in Britain.

Despite its popularity, LWT's overall approach towards local news provision was criticised by the Independent Broadcasting Authority.

=== LWT News ===
During 1987, LWT finally responded to the IBA's concerns by announcing plans to launch a full-strength weekend news service for the first time. The company decided to outsource production of LWT News (on a two-year contract worth around £3.5 million) to the news agency Screen News, after beating around twenty applications from other groups.

The service launched on Friday 8 January 1988, providing at least eight bulletins of local news, sport and weather each weekend. Production switched to Chrysalis Television in January 1990.

The bulletins were later supplemented by a weekly in-depth review programme entitled LWT News Weekend. At the time, LWT's head of news was Mark Sharman, who would later become ITV's controller of news and sport.

Presenters included Lynda Dryburgh, Pam Royle, Anna Maria Ashe, Ed Boyle and Lindsay Charlton, who would later become head of factual at London News Network and managing director of Meridian.

LWT News ceased operation on Sunday 3 January 1993 to make way for the launch of a new seven-day news service jointly run by LWT and Carlton Television, in a joint venture known as London News Network.

=== Friday Now! ===
As part of the launch of LWT News, The Six O'Clock Show was axed in July 1988 and replaced on 7 October 1988 by a smaller-scale current affairs programme entitled Friday Now!, presented by Pam Royle with reporters Charles Colville, Rob Sprackling, Jeni Barnett and Chris Serle.

Originally intended to air for 50 weeks each year, the programme was axed after just ten months due to poor ratings, airing its final edition on Friday 28 July 1989.

=== Six O'Clock Live ===
Six O'Clock Live titles

Six O'Clock Live was an hour-long news magazine programme launched on Friday 1 September 1989 and presented by Frank Bough and Jeni Barnett with reporters including Danny Baker, Jo Sheldon and Nick Owen. Unlike its predecessor, the programme (produced in-house) also incorporated LWT News bulletins from Screen News, and later, Chrysalis.

Six O'Clock Live's last programme aired on Friday 21 August 1992 in preparation for the launch of London News Network the following year, which would be run as a joint venture between LWT and the incoming ITV contractor for London weekdays, Carlton Television. From the following week up until Christmas 1992, an extended Friday early evening LWT News bulletin was aired at the beginning of LWT's weekend transmissions at 5:15pm whilst the 6pm slot was filled by the Australian soap opera Home and Away.
