= Mike Embley =

British journalist

- Born: Michael Kenneth Embley; 25 May 1955 (age 71); Sutton, London, England
- Occupation: Journalist
- Years active: 1979–2021
- Known for: BBC News presenter

Michael Kenneth Embley (born 25 May 1955) is an English broadcast journalist, best known as a presenter for BBC World News, an international news and current affairs television channel operated by the BBC. He formerly presented overnight Thursday-Friday on BBC World News, BBC One and the BBC News Channel.

== Early life ==
Embley was born in Sutton, Surrey.

Before joining the BBC, Embley began his career training as a newspaper journalist with Thomson daily papers in Wales, on the South Wales Echo and the Western Mail.

== BBC career ==
Embley began broadcasting in 1983, working for BBC Wales' Wales Today, followed by the consumer affairs programme Watchdog in 1987, and Public Eye in 1989. Whilst working on Public Eye, he was the first British reporter to reach San Francisco to report on the earthquake.

Embley later joined ITN's Channel 4 News to work as a producer and reporter, before returning to the BBC as a reporter for the flagship One O'Clock News, Six O'Clock News and Nine O'Clock News bulletins. During this time, Embley also worked as a series presenter for Nature on BBC Two and made two films for Panorama.

Embley joined BBC World in 1995, and remained there for two years until he became the main presenter of Newsroom South East, the BBC's regional news programme for London and the South East of England. After the programme was replaced by two separate regional bulletins (BBC London and South East Today) in 2001, Embley rejoined BBC World as a presenter. Since then, he has also presented on the domestic BBC News Channel and carried out one-on-one interviews for the BBC programme HARDtalk, as well as reporting several series for the radio station BBC World Service.

Embley retired on 15 April 2021.
