= The Six O'Clock Show =

British television magazine show

- Created by: Greg Dyke
- Presented by: Michael Aspel
- Country of origin: England

Production
- Producer: London Weekend Television
- Running time: 60 minutes

Original release
- Network: London Weekend Television
- Release: 8 January 1982 – 15 July 1988

Related
- London Tonight

The Six O'Clock Show is a regional television magazine show that was broadcast in the Greater London area and produced by London Weekend Television between 1982 and 1988.

The Friday evening programme was launched on 8 January 1982 and presented in front of a live studio audience by Michael Aspel with co-hosts Danny Baker, Andy Price and Janet Street-Porter. Later co-hosts included Paula Yates, Shyama Perera, Samantha Fox, Chris Tarrant, Emma Freud and Fred Housego.

Devised by Greg Dyke and intended as a light-hearted introduction to the weekend, the programme included a 15-minute news bulletin, Thames Weekend News, produced by Thames Television alongside current affairs, features and entertainment. There was also a short-lived Saturday edition of the programme, which ran for six weeks during May and June 1985 – while Aspel hosted The Saturday Six O'Clock Show, Gloria Hunniford took over on the main Friday show. The Six O'Clock Show went on to become one of the most watched regional TV programmes in Britain. One of the programme's first researchers, Paul Ross, later took over from Dyke as the show's editor.

Concern from the Independent Broadcasting Authority about the lack of a proper local news service at weekends forced LWT to introduce its own service of LWT News bulletins throughout the weekend in 1988; the bulletins were produced originally by the news agency Screen News. The Six O'Clock Show aired its final edition on 15 July 1988 and was replaced by a smaller scale magazine show, Friday Now. This in turn, was replaced a year later by Six O'Clock Live, presented by Frank Bough with reporters Danny Baker, Jo Sheldon and Nick Owen.

Six O'Clock Live was axed towards the end of 1992 in preparation for the launch of a new seven-days-a-week news service run jointly by LWT and Carlton, which became known as London News Network. LWT News was also axed at the end of 1992 to make way for London Tonight.
