= Trish Bertram =

British television continuity personality

Trish Bertram is a British television continuity announcer and voice-over artist.

== Career ==
Bertram started her career in 1982 with London Weekend Television. She joined the pan-European satellite channel Super Channel in 1987 as an announcer and presenter.

Alongside colleague Glen Thompsett, she made the last announcement (a recorded in-vision link) on LWT's last night as an on-air brand on 27 October 2002.

=== Olympics ===
Bertram was one of the stadium announcers for the closing ceremony of the 2012 Summer Olympics and the opening and closing ceremonies of the 2012 Summer Paralympics ceremonies in London with Marc Edwards.
