= London Tourist Board =

Organization

The London Tourist Board was the official destination marketing organisation for London.

== History ==
It established in 1963 and became the official regional tourist board for London under the Development of Tourism Act 1969. It was responsible for the marketing and promotion of the capital, providing tourist information services, and recommending improvements to the infrastructure and facilities for the growth of tourism.

Before its abolition, the London Tourist Board received part of its funding from the Greater London Council.

During the period between the abolition of the Greater London Council and the establishment of the Greater London Council, the London Tourist Board promoted the London Docklands area and other areas outside of the West End of London.

In 2003, the organisation was renamed VisitLondon. In 2011, the Greater London Authority merged the organisation with ThinkLondon and StudyLondon to become London and Partners.
