= BBC London (TV programme) =

BBC television news programme for Greater London

- Title card used since April 2022
- Also known as: BBC LDN (2001–2004); BBC London News (former name)
- Theme music composer: David Lowe
- Country of origin: United Kingdom
- Original language: English

Production
- Producers: BBC News; BBC London
- Production locations: Studio B, Broadcasting House, London; Studio D, Broadcasting House, London
- Camera setup: Multi-camera
- Running time: 30 minutes (main 6:30 pm programme); 10 minutes (1:35 pm and 10:30 pm programmes); Various (during weekends and Breakfast)

Original release
- Network: BBC One London
- Release: 1 October 2001 – present

BBC London is the BBC's regional television news programme for Greater London and its surrounding areas of the Home Counties.

News bulletins are broadcast daily on BBC One in London and the surrounding areas. On weekdays, three-minute updates are aired during BBC Breakfast, a 10-minute bulletin airs at 1:35 pm during the BBC News at One, and a 15-minute bulletin airs after the BBC News at Ten. The flagship half-hour programme is at 6.30 pm each weekday, after the BBC News at Six, and is usually presented by Riz Lateef, who became the main presenter in March 2006 when she replaced Emily Maitlis. Weekend bulletins are broadcast on Saturday and Sunday evenings.

Weather forecasts are included within bulletins, presented by either Kate Kinsella or Elizabeth Rizzini. The weekday evening weather forecast is usually presented from the roof of the programme's production base at Broadcasting House, or at the location of an outside broadcast from earlier in the programme. Other forecasts are presented primarily from within the BBC London studio or the BBC Weather studio.

Originally broadcast from studios in Marylebone High Street, the programme moved to the newly-built Egton Wing of Broadcasting House in January 2013. Egton Wing was subsequently renamed the John Peel Wing, after the broadcaster of the same name.

== History ==
The programme launched on 1 October 2001 as BBC LDN after a major reorganisation of the BBC's South East region, with the London area splitting away to form its own separate region. The previous programme, Newsroom South East, had gradually decreased in its coverage as certain areas were switched to receive other regional news programmes. Following the launch of South East Today, a brand-new programme for the new South East region, Newsroom South East was broadcast solely to the London area for a short while before it became BBC London News.

During planning, the programme for London had been named London Live, also at the time the name of the region's BBC Local Radio station; titles were produced by the Lambie-Nairn design agency but never shown onscreen.

The eventual title became BBC London, though the programme is always referred to by presenters as BBC London News, while programme titles were originally BBC LDN: an abbreviation of 'London'. However, the programme has long since been called BBC London both on air and TV guide.

The area created for the BBC London programme to broadcast to now covers a much more tightly defined area, chiefly Greater London but still including parts of Bedfordshire, Essex and Hertfordshire in the East of England region and parts of Berkshire, Buckinghamshire, Hampshire, Kent, Oxfordshire, Surrey and West Sussex in the South East England region. There is also some overlap with the editorial areas of other BBC regions in this part of England. Most of Oxfordshire and parts of Buckinghamshire, Wiltshire, Northamptonshire, Berkshire and Gloucestershire now take an opt-out of South Today, while most of Kent and East Sussex has (since 2001) been covered by the BBC South East region based in Tunbridge Wells, which produces South East Today.

Areas that get BBC London News can also receive overlaps from neighbouring regional programmes, which are also well covered-by them, such as:

- Luton, Stevenage, Chelmsford and Southend can receive Look East.
- Guildford, Farnham, Godalming, Henley and Aldershot can receive South Today.
- Crawley, Dartford, Gravesend, and Sevenoaks can receive South East Today.

In 2020, the weekday lunchtime bulletin of BBC London merged with that of South East Today to join forces with the latest on COVID-19 as BBC London and South East, hosted by the South East Today team in Tunbridge Wells. All other bulletins remain separate between the two regions.

On 18 October 2022, BBC London merged production teams with BBC News at Six and Ten teams. This resulted in those programmes moving to Studio B in Broadcasting House. Breakfast, lunchtime, and weekend bulletins continue to be produced in a redesigned Studio D.

== Satellite broadcast ==
The programme can be viewed throughout the UK and Europe on digital satellite channel 974 on the BBC UK regional TV on satellite service.

== Presenters ==
=== News presenters ===
Person	Position
Riz Lateef	Main programme presenter (Monday-Wednesday)
Asad Ahmad	Main programme and late bulletin presenter (Thursday/Friday)
Alpa Patel	Main programme relief presenters
Alice Bhandukravi	Main programme relief presenters
Victoria Hollins	BBC Breakfast bulletin presenters and main programme relief presenters
Alison Earle	BBC Breakfast bulletin presenters and main programme relief presenters
Alice Salfield	BBC Breakfast bulletin presenters and main programme relief presenters
Tolu Adeoye	BBC Breakfast and lunchtime bulletin presenters (rotating)
Barry Caffrey	BBC Breakfast and lunchtime bulletin presenters (rotating)
Nicky Ford	BBC Breakfast and lunchtime bulletin presenters (rotating)
Victoria Cook	BBC Breakfast and lunchtime bulletin presenters (rotating)
Thomas Magill	BBC Breakfast and lunchtime bulletin presenters (rotating)
Paul Murphy	BBC Breakfast and lunchtime bulletin relief presenters
Jim Wheble	BBC Breakfast and lunchtime bulletin relief presenters
Angie George	BBC Breakfast and lunchtime bulletin relief presenters
Hannah Gray	BBC Breakfast and lunchtime bulletin relief presenters

=== Current weather presenters ===
- Gillian Brown
- Kate Kinsella
- Corazon Garcia
- Katerina Christodoulou
- Kawser Quamer

=== Former weather presenters ===
- Georgina Burnett
- Matt Taylor
- John Hammond
- Elizabeth Rizzini

=== Former presenters ===
- Emily Maitlis (1 October 2001–24 March 2006)
- Mike Ramsden (2001–2011)
- Nina Hossain (2001–2004)
- Gillian Joseph (2001–2004)
- Matt Barbet (2003–2006)

=== Travel ===
- Katie Allen

== See also ==
- BBC London and South East
