= Andrew Gardner (newsreader) =

English newsreader

- Born: 25 September 1932; Beaconsfield, Buckinghamshire, England
- Died: 2 April 1999 (aged 66)
- Occupation: Newsreader
- Employer(s): BBC; ITN
- Spouse: Margaret (m. 1958)
- Children: 4

Andrew Gardner (25 September 1932 – 2 April 1999) was an English newsreader on Independent Television News (ITN) in the United Kingdom from 1962 to 1977. He was also one of the original presenters of the half hour News at Ten bulletin when it began in July 1967. Gardner read the news on the regional Thames At 6 (later Thames News) bulletin broadcast on the ITV London weekday franchise Thames Television from 1977 to his retirement in mid-1992.

== Biography ==
Gardner was born as one of three children of an Upper Wimpole Street dentist in Beaconsfield, Buckinghamshire on 25 September 1932. He was educated at the independent Dauntsey's School in West Lavington, Wiltshire, before serving as a corporal in the Royal Air Force's medical administration during his National Service.

== Career ==
Gardner considered becoming an actor but discovered he lacked the talent to pursue that career, and did not want to become a dentist like his father. When he was 21 years old, he moved to Rhodesia in 1954 to avoid seven years of examinations and became a writer of children's stories about a small hedgehog as a hobby, which was adapted into a ten-minute six-part radio series after working a clerical job with a firm of refrigerator manufacturers.

Following an outbreak of the Asian flu epidemic, which reduced the number of available announcers and broadcasters to the Federal Broadcasting Corporation of Rhodesia and Nyasaland, he began a career in radio journalism in the Federation of Rhodesia and Nyasaland in 1957, working as a freelance newsreader-reporter in Africa for the Federal Broadcasting Corporation of Rhodesia and Nyasaland and becoming a staff member 18 months later, working as a producer and nightly newsreel editor. Gardner was one of the first reporters of the massacres that took place during the Congo Crisis in 1960, and also broadcast in Angola, Congo and Mozambique. When he realised that the Federation of Rhodesia and Nyasaland was about to disband, he returned to the United Kingdom in 1961. Gardner enrolled in a one-month broadcasting course at the BBC and began working for the corporation as a broadcaster for its African services and radio shows like Ten O'Clock and Topic for Tonight. He co-chaired the live BBC afternoon television discussion programme Table Talk with Erskine Childers.

== ITN ==
Gardner had a successful television audition in December 1961, and began working for the British commercial television news service ITN as one of four newscasters and a reporter. That year, he and fellow newsreader Reginald Bosanquet were presented with a silver and rose trophy at the National Viewers' and Listeners' Association ceremony for their impartiality and personal popularity. Gardner worked on the television programmes Roving Report and Dateline, Reporting '66 and Reporting '67. He was the presenter of the maiden transatlantic broadcast from the United States to Western Europe via the Telstar 1 satellite in 1962. Gardner also reported in the field, such as the Great Train Robbery in 1963 and the death of Sir Winston Churchill in 1965. He co-presented the first edition of the News at Ten bulletin with Alastair Burnet on 3 July 1967, and continued to read the news on the half-hour bulletin until 1977.

Gardner was asked to present ITN's coverage of special broadcasts such as the Chancellor's Budget and United Kingdom general elections, the Cuban Missile Crisis and the Assassination of John F. Kennedy. Gardner also commentated on state events such as the Wedding of Princess Anne and Mark Phillips, the Silver Jubilee of Elizabeth II, the Silver wedding anniversary of Elizabeth II, ITV's studio coverage of the Wedding of Prince Charles and Lady Diana Spencer (alongside Selina Scott) in 1981 and the first ITV Telethon.

== Thames Television ==
From September 1977, he joined ITV London's weekday television franchise Thames Television on a three-year contract to read the news on the new nightly regional Thames At 6 (later Thames News) programme from Mondays to Fridays. This was partly due to his desire to be in the public eye less often, and he was assured by a producer that it would be a local programme rather than a parochial one. Gardner retired from Thames in mid-1992, before the station ceased broadcasting in the same year and was replaced by Carlton.

== Personal life ==
He met his wife Margaret while the two were working in Salisbury, Rhodesia. They were married in June 1958, and the couple had four children.

== Death ==
Gardner died from a heart attack on 2 April 1999, aged 66, while on a flight to Madeira. At the time of his death, he lived in Benenden, Kent. A memorial service was held for him on the late afternoon of 14 June 1999 at St Martin-in-the-Fields in Trafalgar Square, London, attended by fellow newscasters and journalists.
