= Today (Thames Television series) =

Thames Television news magazine programme

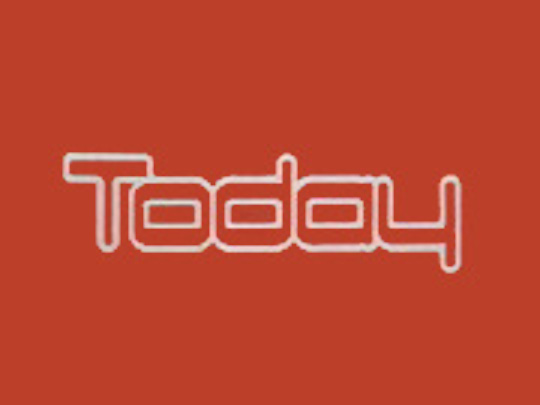
- Genre: News, London (regional)
- Presented by: Eamonn Andrews; Bill Grundy
- Country of origin: United Kingdom
- Original language: English

Production
- Production company: Thames Television

Original release
- Network: Thames Television
- Release: 1968 – 1977

Related
- Thames at Six

Today is Thames Television's first regional news magazine programme, shown in the London area from 1968 to 1977. It was hosted by Eamonn Andrews, Bill Grundy and others.

For nine months, the programme featured Barbara Blake Hannah, the first Black reporter on British television, who was eventually driven off-air by racist complaints.

John Lennon and Yoko Ono made an appearance on the show in 1969, sharing a bed with Eamonn Andrews.

The show is now most commonly remembered for Bill Grundy's 1976 interview with the Sex Pistols, which caused public outrage at the time. Today was replaced in September 1977 by Thames at Six, a more conventional news magazine programme.
