= The London Studios =

Former television studio complex in London, England

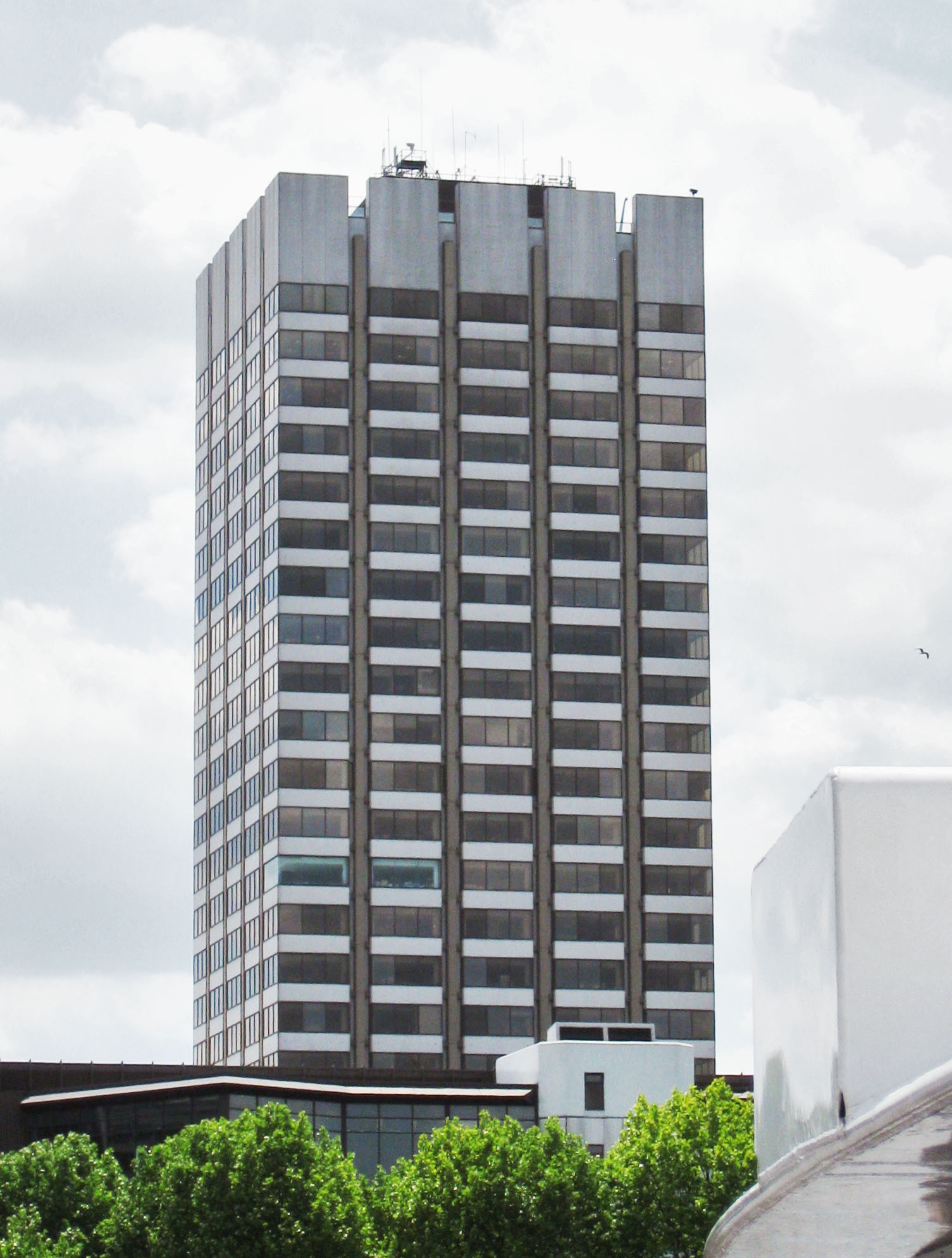

- Location within London Borough of Lambeth Location within Greater London
- Former names: The South Bank Television Centre
- Alternative names: The ITV Studios; London Television Centre; ITV Towers; LWT Tower; LWT

General information
- Type: Television studios
- Location: Lambeth, London, Upper Ground, London, SE1 9LT, England
- Coordinates: 51.50733°N 0.11237°W
- Elevation: 85 m (279 ft)
- Construction started: 1969
- Completed: 1972
- Closed: Studios closed 30 April 2018
- Demolished: 2025 (after plans for rebuilding it into a futuristic studio campus)
- Owner: ITV plc (2013–2019); Mitsubishi Estate London (2019–2025)

Technical details
- Floor count: 24
- Floor area: 2.5 acres

Design and construction
- Architect: EPR Architects
- Structural engineer: Clarke Nicholls and Marcel, Civil and Structural Engineers
- Main contractor: Higgs and Hill

The London Studios (also known as The South Bank Studios, The London Television Centre, ITV Towers, Kent House and LWT Tower) in Lambeth, Central London was a television studio complex owned by ITV plc and originally built for London Weekend Television. The studios were located in Central London, on the South Bank next to the IBM Building and the Royal National Theatre. The building was set on 2.5 acres of land and was 24 floors high. The London Studios closed on 30 April 2018, and demolition began in early 2025.

The facilities were the main studios for ITV, along with a number of production companies including ITV Studios and Shiver based in Kent House tower, while the studios were home to many entertainment, game and daytime shows. These included Good Morning Britain, The Graham Norton Show, Ant & Dec's Saturday Night Takeaway and The Jonathan Ross Show. The studios were also used for other programmes from various other channels including BBC Television and Channel 4. ITV Creative, which promotes programmes on the ITV network, was also based at the London Studios. Many ITV programmes now come from Television Centre in White City, London.

== History ==
When LWT succeeded ATV as the London weekend ITV franchisee in 1968, it rented Associated-Rediffusion's old studios at Wembley (later known as The Fountain Studios) while plans for a new studio complex in central London were drawn up.

The chosen site stood beside the then new Royal National Theatre on the South Bank of the River Thames. It was bought in 1969, and construction work, awarded to Higgs and Hill, began in 1970. The centre opened for transmission in 1972, though it was not fully operational until 1974. The complex was owned by the pension fund of the National Coal Board and leased by the station. It was originally called The South Bank Television Centre (a name that lasted until the early 1990s) and at the time was the most advanced television centre in Europe.

On 28 January 2013 ITV plc finally bought the freehold of the now renamed London Television Centre for £56 million from what had become Coal Pension Properties.

On social media, the building is named 'ITV Towers' since the purchase in January 2013. The official name of the building is The London Television Centre (with the studio business branded as 'The London Studios'), that being the logo in reception and around the building.

The site closed in April 2018 for demolition. Initially, ITV intended to redevelop the site with three smaller studios, but in October 2018 it announced it would not be returning to the South Bank, and the whole site would be redeveloped into premium housing.

In November 2019, it was announced that ITV had reached an agreement to sell The London Studios for £145.6 million to Mitsubishi Estate London. New plans for the redevelopment of the site into a commercial development were revealed in February 2021.

Demolition of the site commenced in early 2025.

== The building ==
=== Kent House Tower ===
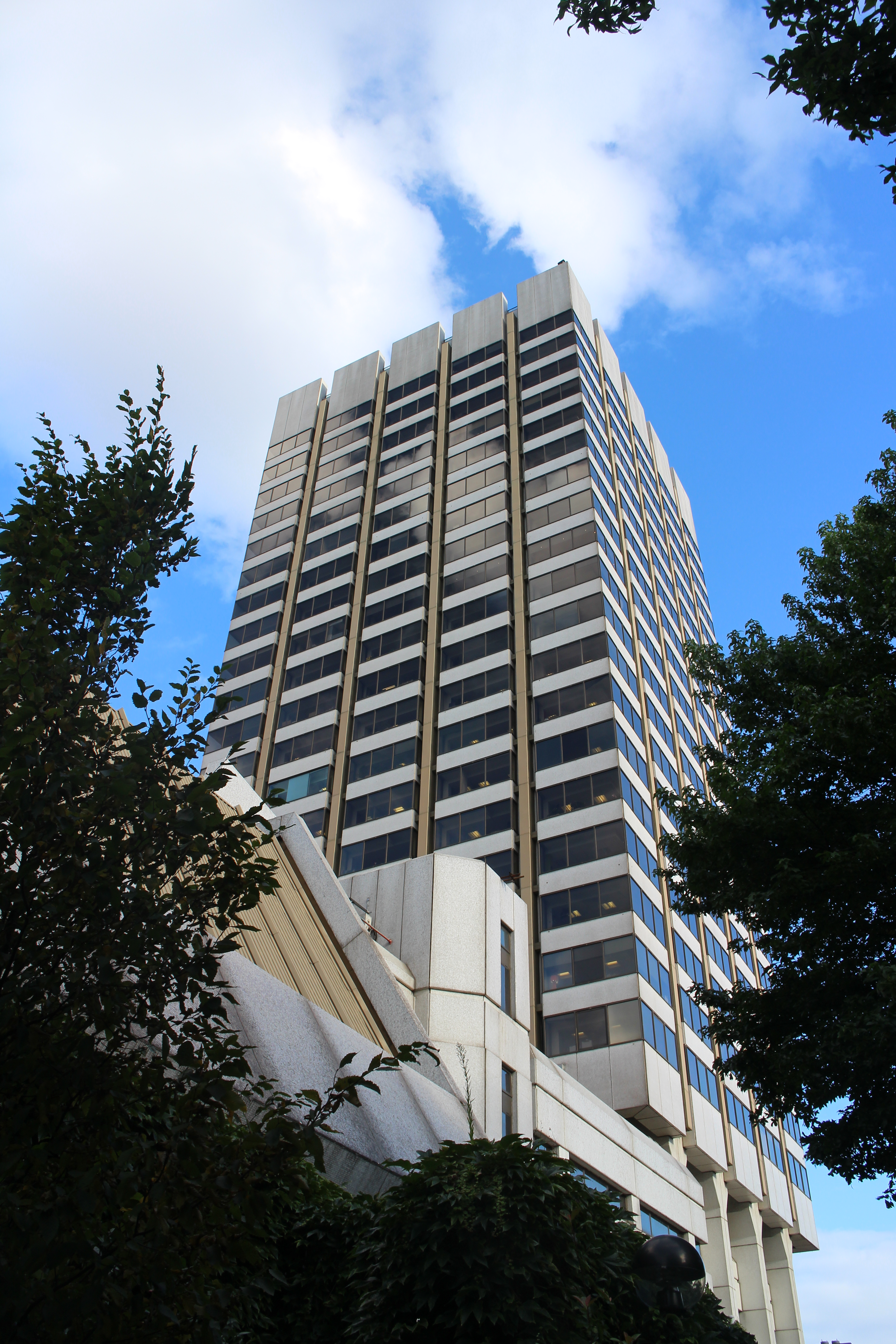
Kent House Tower

Kent House was a 24-storey tower block, which was home to ITV plc and many production offices including ITV Studios and Shiver Productions. During the 1990s the block was also home to Carlton Television and GMTV. It was seen in the titles of Good Morning Britain and series 5-15 of Ant and Dec's Saturday Night Takeaway. The tower housed programme production offices, edit suites, dubbing suites, VTR studio booths and graphic booths.

=== Main Studio Block ===
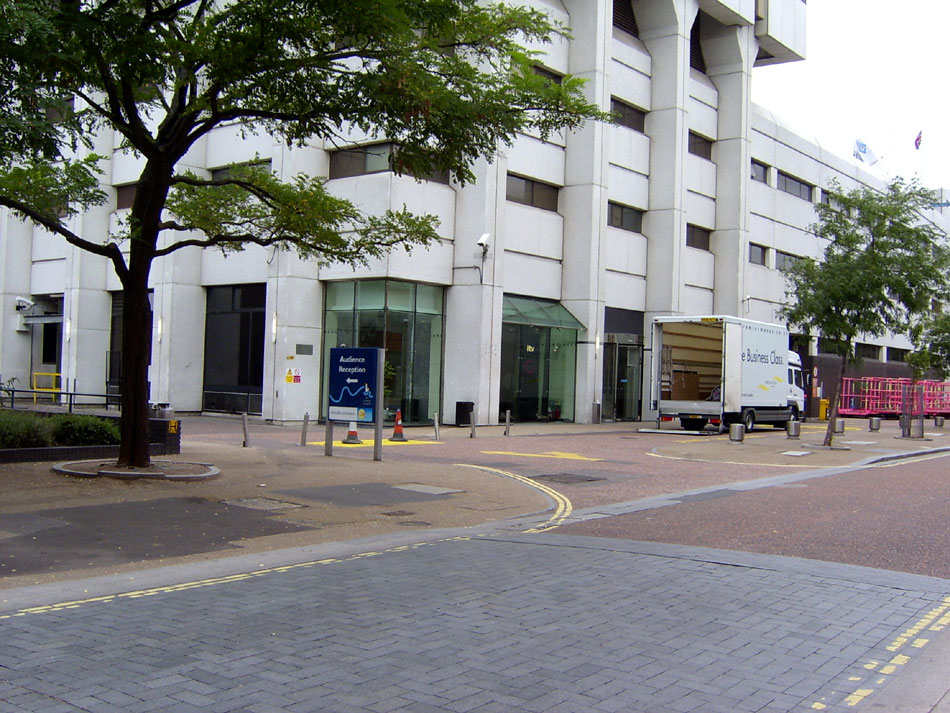
Building entrance

Sandwiched between Kent House Tower and the River Thames were the main studio blocks, housing studios 1, 2, 3, 5 and 7, the restaurant, the takeaway bar (prior studio cafe), management offices, edit facilities, make-up and wardrobe. It was designed by London-based architecture practice Elsom Pack & Roberts.

=== Gabriel's Wharf ===
On the east side of the site, there is a neighbouring building called Gabriel's Wharf. Previously belonging to Younger's Brewery, this three-storey building was added later to the site as a scenery store. When This Morning moved from Liverpool, the 3,000 square feet (280 m^{2}) studio 8 was converted from the riverside end of the first storey. This area was on lease from Coin Street Community Builders to ITV until 2018, when they left the premises.

=== Studios ===
There were a total of nine different studios during the complex's lifespan. By the time of closure there were six. There were weather studios producing the ITV national, and some of the network's regional forecasts at ITN's headquarters in Gray's Inn Road.

- Studio 1 – 8,350 sq ft (776 m^{2}) – The largest studio on the complex. This studio was home to programmes such as All Star Family Fortunes, All Star Mr & Mrs, The Graham Norton Show, Ant & Dec's Saturday Night Takeaway and Text Santa. The studio had a permanent fixed balcony seating area which, along with movable seating, could accommodate audiences of up to 638. This made the studio popular for large audience based shows. Studio 1 was upgraded to HD in December 2009.
- Studio 2 – 7,271 sq ft (675.5 m^{2}) – The second largest on the complex housed shows such as Piers Morgan's Life Stories, The Alan Titchmarsh Show, Let's Do Lunch with Gino & Mel, Have I Got News for You and It'll Be Alright on the Night. The studio could accommodate large audiences of up to 462. The studio could also be used as a bare shell as the audience seating structure could be moved out. Studio 2 was upgraded to HD in the summer of 2009.
- Studio 3 – 3,136 sq ft (291.3 m^{2}) – This studio housed daily chatshow Loose Women, political chat show Peston on Sunday and ITV Breakfast programme Lorraine. The studio could accommodate audiences of up to 150. The studio also had an "in-the-round" seating feature with up to 108 audience capacity, with the presenters and set in the middle with the audiences seated around them. It briefly became the home of GMTV from July to September 2010 before the launch of Daybreak. This studio then became the home for Daybreak between September 2012 and April 2014. Studio 3 was upgraded to HD in the summer of 2012.
- Studio 4 – Located in the tower block, LWT’s in-vision continuity was broadcast from here until out-of-vision continuity was introduced, when studio 4 was closed. It was then converted back to offices.
- Studio 5 – 2,268 sq ft (210.7 m^{2}) – Based at the bottom of Kent House. This studio was previously used by GMTV from January 1993 to July 2010 (before it temporarily moved to Studio 3), The Big Match from 1972 to 1992 and World of Sport from 1972 to 1985. From April 2014, Good Morning Britain began using this studio.
- Studio 6 – There has never been a 'Studio 6' on the complex. There was also a bar and restaurant in Gabriel's Wharf next door named 'Studio Six'.
- Studio 7 – 2,050 sq ft (190 m^{2}) – Located in the studio block on the river's bank, this studio presented panoramic views over the London skyline, including St. Paul’s Cathedral, through its floor-to-ceiling windows. Studio 7 was home to London News Network’s local news bulletins from 1993 until 2004. It was built in 1993 for the newly created London News Network, a company which provided local news for the ITV Network in London. Prior to 1993, LWT, the London weekend ITV franchisee, had produced news bulletins for London on Friday evenings, Saturdays and Sundays from studio 10, whilst Thames Television had provided its own news during the rest of the week from its own studios. The new partnership between London weekday licensee Carlton and LWT meant one news bulletin would be seen all week, London Tonight. After the Carlton and Granada merger to form ITV plc however, LNN was disbanded and Independent Television News took over the contract. London Tonight is now produced in their studios on Gray's Inn Road. It was then used as the home of ITV Sport and also for Loose Women, I'm a Celebrity...Get Me Out of Here! NOW!, Strictly Come Dancing: It Takes Two, and various specials for Canadian television. ITV's breakfast programme Daybreak used the studio from 6 September 2010 to 31 August 2012. For the launch of Daybreak, the studio was converted to high-definition. It continued to be used by ITV Sport, most recently for its coverage of IPL Cricket on ITV4, as well as use for CBBC's Friday Download.
- Studio 8 – 2,958 sq ft (274.8 m^{2}) – This studio was located beside the main complex in the building known as Gabriel’s Wharf. Daytime show This Morning occupied this studio after the show moved to London from Liverpool in 1996. It had four large one-way mirrored windows overlooking the Thames which appeared silver from the outside, restricting people being able to see in from the outside and reducing glare inside.
- Studio 9 – This small studio was used when ITV2 used in-vision announcers and was located next to studio 7. It was used for the studio's tapeless recording system allowing editors to edit programmes shortly after they were recorded.
- Studio 10 – Studio 10 was on the 10th floor of the tower and was used for London’s weekend and Friday evening’s local news (produced originally by LWT) as well as Crime Monthly before studio 7 was built. This studio was equipped with Philips cameras and a show entitled Talk TV was output from here for Talk Digital Channel before the studio was converted into offices in 2003. The studio was visible from the South Bank by looking towards the tower with one's head facing away from St Paul's Cathedral and noting the studio’s windows (which are slightly blue and clearer in comparison to the other windows).

== ITV ==
The studios were originally built by the London weekend ITV franchise holder, London Weekend Television (LWT). In 1991, Carlton Television won the London weekday franchise from Thames Television, but unlike Thames, Carlton had no studios of its own. Carlton rented space from The London Studios from 1993 for its own post-production and continuity facilities. This arrangement continued until 2002, when an agreement was reached for Carlton to be permanently based within space used by LWT; in the intervening years LWT had been taken over by Granada plc, and a close relationship had developed between Granada and Carlton. This led to consolidation within the ITV network and an agreement for the two to work together as ITV London.

Since 2002, all the ITV plc-owned regions' continuity before national programmes were presented from the London Studios and additional continuity before regional programmes in the following regions: Meridian, Westcountry, HTV West, Anglia, the non-franchise ITV Thames Valley region and since 16 January 2006 HTV Wales, although between 2002 and 15 January 2006, the Welsh station's continuity was recorded and sent electronically to London. The complex also housed the continuity of ITV plc's digital channels ITV2, ITV3, ITV4 and CITV. The site also handled the playout of all the above until 2007, when the service was outsourced to Technicolor Network Services (TNS) (now part of Ericsson). The play-out is now run from Ericsson's broadcast centre in Chiswick.

Ericsson now provides network feeds to transmission centres in Leeds (home of the Northern Transmission Centre, which was also originally taken over by TNS as part of the outsourcing deal) and Glasgow (STV).

=== ITV Studios ===
In 1994, Granada Group took over LWT and acquired the building. When ITV franchises were permitted to take one another over in the 1990s (which were previously restricted), Carlton and Granada between them, eventually owned all the franchises in England and Wales, merged in 2004. All of Carlton's studios had either been sold, or were surplus to requirements.

The studios produced the bulk of original ITV Studios' programmes, but anyone could hire the studios, so the studios were often seen on other channels' programmes.

== Notable programmes ==
The London Studios was home to many popular programmes. List of shows, studio used and network broadcast on below:

Years	Programme	Channel	Studio
1972–1992	LWT in-vision continuity	LWT	Studio 4
1972–1975	Upstairs, Downstairs	ITV	Studio 2
1972–1992	The Big Match	ITV	Studio 5
1972–1985	World of Sport	ITV	Studio 5
1977–2016	It'll Be Alright On The Night	ITV	Studio 2
1978–2010	The South Bank Show	ITV	Studio 5
1978–2012	An Audience With...	ITV	Studio 1
1980–1987, 1994–1999, 2002–2003	Play Your Cards Right	ITV	Studio 1
1981–1985	Game for a Laugh	ITV	Studio 1
1982–1988	The 6 O'Clock Show	LWT	Studio 1
1984–2001, 2003, 2012–15	Surprise Surprise	ITV	Studio 1
1985–2003, 2017–2018	Blind Date	ITV and Channel 5	Studios 1 & 2
1988–1998	Hale and Pace	ITV	Studio 1
1989–1992	News & Six O'Clock Live	LWT	Studio 10
1989–1991	Sale of the Century	Sky One	Studio 1
1989–1994	Desmond's	Channel 4	Unknown
1990–2018	Have I Got News for You	BBC Two and BBC One	Studio 2
1991–2009	British Comedy Awards	ITV	Studio 1
1993–2010	GMTV	ITV	Studios 3 & 5
1993–2004	LNN programmes	Carlton & LWT	Studio 7
1994–1995	Don't Forget Your Toothbrush	Channel 4	Studio 1
1995–1998	Father Ted	Channel 4	Unknown
1995–2005	Jonathan Dimbleby	ITV	Studio 3
1996–1999	Michael Barrymore's Strike It Rich	ITV	Studio 1
1996–2018	This Morning	ITV	Studio 8
1998-2002	My Kind of Music	ITV	Studio 1
1998–2003	SMTV Live	ITV	Studio 2
1998–2003	CD:UK	ITV	Studio 2
1999–2018	Loose Women	ITV	Studio 3
2000–2010	Pride of Britain Awards	ITV	Unknown
2001–2002, 2016	Blankety Blank	ITV	Studio 1
2002–2009, 2013–2018	Ant & Dec's Saturday Night Takeaway	ITV	Studio 1
2002	I'm a Celebrity... Get Me Out of Here! The Reunion	ITV	Studio 1
2003–2018	QI	BBC Two	Studio 1
2004–2005, 2007–2009, 2013–2015	The Paul O'Grady Show	ITV and Channel 4	Studio 2
2005–2007	Gameshow Marathon	ITV	Studio 1
2005	Avenue of the Stars: 50 Years of ITV	ITV	Studio 1
2005	The Jeremy Kyle Show	ITV	Unknown
2006–2015	All Star Family Fortunes	ITV	Studio 1
2007–2008	Al Murray's Happy Hour	ITV	Studio 1
2007–2018	The Graham Norton Show	BBC One	Studio 1
2007	That's What I Call Television	ITV	Studio 1
2007	This Is Your Life	ITV	Studio 1
2010	The Krypton Factor	ITV	Studio 1
2010	The 5 O'Clock Show	Channel 4	Studio 3
2010–2018	Lorraine	ITV	Studio 3
2010–2014	Daybreak	ITV	Studios 3 & 7
2010–2011	Paul O'Grady Live	ITV	Studio 1
2010, 2012	The British Soap Awards	ITV	Studio 1
2010–2013 (daytime), 2011–2018 (celebrity)	The Chase	ITV	Studio 1
2011–2016	The Jonathan Ross Show	ITV	Studio 1
2011–2015	Text Santa	ITV	Studio 1
2011–2014	The Alan Titchmarsh Show	ITV	Studio 2
2011–2014	Let's Do Lunch with Gino & Mel	ITV	Studio 2
2012–2018	Piers Morgan's Life Stories	ITV	Studio 2
2012–2018	The Last Leg	Channel 4	Studio 2
2012–2013, 2015	The One and Only...	ITV	Studio 1
2012	Dale's Great Getaway	ITV	Studio 1
2013, 2016–2017	Catchphrase	ITV	Studio 2
2013–2016	Strictly: It Takes Two	BBC Two	Studio 7
2014–2015	Celebrity Squares	ITV	Studio 2
2014–2015	Miranda	BBC One	Studio 2
2014–2018	The Great British Bake Off: An Extra Slice	BBC Two and Channel 4	Studio 2
2014–2018	Good Morning Britain	ITV	Studio 5
2015	Pick Me!	ITV	Studio 2
2015	Get Your Act Together	ITV	Studio 1
2016	Go for It	ITV	Studios 1 & 2
2016	Naked Attraction	Channel 4	Unknown
2016–2018	Unspun with Matt Forde	Dave	Studio 2
2016–2018	Peston on Sunday	ITV	Studio 3
2017	Babushka	ITV	Studio 1
2017	Don't Ask Me Ask Britain	ITV	Studio 2
2017	The Fake News Show	Channel 4	Studio 2
2017	Tonight	ITV	Studio 5
2017–2018	Harry Hill's Alien Fun Capsule	ITV	Studio 2
2017–2018	CelebAbility	ITV2	Unknown

== Amateur radio ==
The building used to host an amateur radio repeater, GB3LW. The site was provided by the London Weekend TV Amateur Radio Society.
