= Dormant company =

Currently inactive company

A dormant company is a company that carries out no business activities in the given period of time.

== United Kingdom ==
In the United Kingdom, a dormant company is a company whose transactions have been limited to payment for shares taken by subscribers to the memorandum of association, fees paid to the Registrar of Companies for a change of company name, the re-registration of a company, filing a confirmation statement and payment made in respect of civil penalties imposed by the Registrar of Companies for delivering accounts to the Registrar after the statutory time allowed for filing.

Whilst filing annual accounts is still a requirement for dormant companies, instead of filing a full set of annual accounts, dormant companies can file a basic set of accounts known as a dormant company accounts (DCA). Dormant company accounts do not need to be audited, except for the year during which the company becomes dormant.

Under the Companies Act 2006 there are exceptions for certain companies. For example, some financial and insurance companies are under obligation to file their full accounts, regardless of their status.

== Singapore ==
In Singapore, a dormant company is defined by two authorities: Accounting and Corporate Regulatory Authority (ACRA) and Inland Revenue Authority of Singapore (IRAS). For ACRA the determining factor for dormancy is the lack of transactions. For IRAS, a company that does not generate income is considered dormant. The companies deemed dormant by the authorities can be exempted from filing annual financials and submitting tax return. For the latter, a waiver has to be issued by IRAS.
