= BBC Newsroom South East =

BBC television news programme for southeastern England (1989–2001)

- The last incarnation of the programme titles used from October 1999 until September 2001
- Presented by: Mike Embley; Gillian Joseph; Nina Hossain; Tim Donovan; Heather Lima; Gwenan Edwards; Tim Ewart; Rob Curling; Guy Michelmore; Martine Croxall; Julia George; Fiona Bruce

Production
- Producer: BBC South East
- Running time: Main bulletin: 25 minutes

Original release
- Network: BBC One
- Release: 28 March 1989 – 30 September 2001

Related
- BBC London News; South East Today; South Today

BBC Newsroom South East was the BBC's regional news programme aired on BBC One in the South East from 1989 to 2001.

It was launched on Tuesday 28 March 1989 as the successor to London Plus, the South East's previous news programme.

In 1992, South Today replaced BBC Newsroom South East in the Heathfield coverage area (which subsequently switched to South East Today in 2001). In October 2000, the Oxford coverage area also broke away from BBC Newsroom South East, in favour of joining South Today with opt-out privileges.

In September 2001, South East Today launched as a replacement for BBC Newsroom South East in the Bluebell Hill and Dover coverage areas, leaving the Crystal Palace coverage area alone in its broadcast of BBC Newsroom South East for a month, before being replaced by the new BBC London News in October 2001, thereby bringing BBC Newsroom South East to an end.

The main presenter of the programme in its early years was Guy Michelmore, the son of BBC presenter Cliff Michelmore. For all but the last two months, the programme was broadcast from the BBC Elstree Centre, in Borehamwood, Hertfordshire. In August 2001 the future home of the successor BBC London News programme – a new and purpose built broadcast centre on the Marylebone High Street – was used alongside radio station BBC London Live. To provide continuity to staff prior to the launch of BBC London News, the Elstree set was temporarily placed in the Marylebone Road studios for these few weeks, although the smaller space meant that there was only space for one presenter.

Following the 1999 BBC News relaunch, the main bulletin aired between 6:30 and 6:55 pm after the BBC Six O'Clock News. Other bulletins followed the BBC One O'Clock News and the BBC Ten O'Clock News. Main presenters included Mike Embley, Gwenan Edwards, Gargy Patel, Gillian Joseph, Tim Donovan, Heather Lima and sports presenter Rob Curling.

Unlike other BBC regions, BBC Newsroom South East never had a dedicated weather forecaster; instead the weather came from whichever national forecaster was presenting that particular day.
