= London Weekend Television =

ITV weekend service for London

- Version of the logo used from 1 September 1978 to 24 August 1986.

- The LWT region when it lost its identity in 2002
- Type: Region of television network
- Branding: London Weekend (1968–1969); London Weekend Television (1969–1978); LWT (1978–2002)
- Country: United Kingdom
- First air date: 2 August 1968; 58 years ago
- Motto: Your Weekend ITV; Across the capital, across the weekend, this is LWT
- TV transmitters: Crystal Palace (formerly Bluebell Hill, Croydon)
- Headquarters: The London Studios, London
- Broadcast area: London and parts of South East England
- Owner: Granada plc
- Dissolved: Lost on-air identity on 27 October 2002; 24 years ago (after 34 years, 86 days, now known as ITV1 at all times)
- Picture format: 405 line (1968–1984) (Note: 405-line transmissions ended in England on 3 January 1985, so LWT's last day on 405 lines would have been Sunday 30 December 1984.); 625 line PAL colour (1969–2002); 576i (1998–2002)
- Affiliation: ITV
- Official website: itv.com/london
- Language: English
- Replaced: ATV London on Saturdays and Sundays; Rediffusion, London on Friday evenings
- Replaced by: ITV London

London Weekend Television (LWT; now part of the non-franchised ITV London region) was the ITV network franchise holder for Greater London and the home counties at weekends, broadcasting from Fridays at 5:15 pm (7:00 pm from 1968 until 1982) to Monday mornings at 6:00. From 1968 until 1992, when LWT's weekday counterpart was Thames Television; there was an on-screen handover to LWT on Friday nights (there was no handover back to Thames on Mondays, as from 1968 to 1982 there was no programming in the very early morning, and from 1983, when a national breakfast franchise was created, LWT would hand over to TV-am at 6:00am, which would then hand over to Thames at 9:25am). From 1993 to 2002, when LWT's weekday counterpart was Carlton Television, the transfer usually occurred invisibly during a commercial break, for Carlton and LWT shared studio and transmission facilities (although occasionally a Thames-to-LWT-style handover would appear).

Like most ITV regional franchises, including Carlton's, the London weekend franchise is now operated by ITV plc. The "London Weekend" franchise was renewed by Ofcom in 2015 for ten years and is still separately licensed, but is no longer distinguished on air, only on the regional weather forecast, for example “(company) sponsors ITV London Weekend Weather” (ITV London Weekday weather during weekdays). LWT is now managed with Carlton Television as a single entity (ITV London), although the name for the London Weekend licence on the Ofcom site is still "LWT". London Weekend Television Ltd is now (along with most other former regional companies owned by ITV plc) listed at Companies House as a "dormant company".

== History ==
=== Early years ===
==== Creation ====
The London Television Consortium (LTC) was created and led by television presenter David Frost, who, at the time, was working for the London weekday ITV station Rediffusion. The consortium also included three ex-BBC members of staff: Michael Peacock (controller of BBC1), Frank Muir (assistant head of BBC comedy) and Doreen Stephens (head of children's output). Rediffusion's Controller of Programmes, Cyril Bennett, also joined the consortium, along with Clive Irving, theatre director Peter Hall and, for financial backing, Arnold Weinstock, managing director of GEC.

Frost had originally considered applying for the new Yorkshire region franchise, but the expected high number of applicants led to a change of plans. The second choice was to take on Rediffusion for their contract but, although it held the largest and most profitable licence, it was felt that the company was too powerful to challenge; equally, as an employee of the station, he felt it would be seen as an act of betrayal. Changes elsewhere in the system (notably the decision to make the Midlands licence a seven-day operation) led Frost to believe that the existing Midlands weekday broadcaster ATV had a significant risk of losing its London weekend contract.

The consortium's application promised a variety of highbrow arts and drama productions. It accordingly caught the attention of the regulator, the Independent Television Authority (ITA), and it seemed to address concerns and criticisms raised in the Pilkington Report. The authority had been worried by criticism of the network's output, which was seen as downmarket and the LTC plans were viewed by the ITA as being serious contenders to the quality educational programming of the BBC. So keen was the ITA that it was quoted at the time as saying the LTC had to have its chance, whatever the repercussions.

The new company, renamed London Weekend Television, benefited from a slight extension in broadcasting hours, as they were allocated Fridays from 7 p.m., as well as Saturday and Sunday. The LTC had planned on buying the superior Teddington Studios of former contractor ABC Weekend TV, but following ABC's merger with Rediffusion to form Thames Television, the LTC were forced by the ITA to purchase Rediffusion's Wembley Studios and legally obliged to employ all members of staff, although the workforce was slightly larger than LWT had wanted. Having previously worked weekdays for Rediffusion, transmission staff now had to work at weekends, and, as a result, wanted extra pay for the unsocial hours. This led to threats of industrial action, and, with the dispute still unresolved, fifteen seconds into their opening night of 2 August 1968, technicians went on strike and the screens went blank. An emergency service was provided by management from the transmission centre of ATV at Foley Street, London.

==== Near collapse ====
Upon resolving the dispute, LWT suffered poor rating figures, as the station's evening viewing schedule included a Stravinsky musical drama, an avant-garde drama from French film director Jean-Luc Godard, a tribute to Belgian singer-songwriter Jacques Brel, and Georgia Brown Sings Kurt Weill. As a consequence, viewers deserted its primetime offerings in favour of the more mainstream Saturday night viewing on BBC1. Other ITV stations refused to show LWT productions because of the poor ratings. ATV, now the seven-day Midlands franchise holder after losing their London contract to LWT, refused to transmit any of their programmes in peak time; elsewhere, the powerful sales department at Thames Television, who provided London with a Monday to Friday service, took advantage of LWT's ratings crisis by adopting a "beggar thy neighbour" strategy, encouraging advertisers to use Thames during the week by heavily discounting their airtime.

The situation came to a head during a meeting of the Network Programme Committee on 9 September 1968. The NPC was being chaired by Lew Grade, ATV's managing director, and he is quoted as saying on this occasion: "I've succeeded in business by knowing exactly what I hate", he told them. "And I know I hate David Frost." Frost was present, but no one else spoke out against LWT's programming policy. Meanwhile, the £6.5 million it had initially put up for the franchise began to drain away more quickly than its audience figures. Michael Peacock, the architect in David Frost's vision for the future of television, wanted to stick to the principles of their contract with the ITA. ATV dropped Frost's major Saturday night slot altogether and replaced him with comedian Dave Allen, while Yorkshire and Granada relegated the show to the late evening.

In September 1969, Michael Peacock was sacked by the board while six executives resigned from LWT in support. The ITA made it clear that LWT's franchise proposals must be retained. As the crisis at LWT deepened, staff members held a protest outside the offices of the ITA, complaining about the changes happening at the station. An 800-strong petition was handed in to the ITA, to ask for an inquiry about the crisis at LWT. The ITA started to make emergency plans in the event of the company collapsing, and MPs asked questions in Parliament. At the same time, Thames started making enquiries about a seven-day contract in such an event – an offer quickly rebuffed by the ITA. In the general panic that followed, the General Electric Company withdrew financial backing and sold its 7.5% share to Rupert Murdoch's News International in November 1970. By December 1970, Murdoch become a part-time executive and injected £500,000 of new capital, increasing his share to 30% as part of the deal, also insisting on terminating Frost and his Paradine Productions, an action that was carried out at once. He continued to increase his stake further and, by the end of 1971, he possessed 39.7%.

Rupert Murdoch became managing director in February 1971. When Dr Tom Margerison left the company, he stated "there is no question of personal animosity between Rupert and myself. It's just one of those things: you cannot have two people running a ship." He had believed Murdoch was to become a non-executive director, but it was clear that he was going further than this.

Murdoch started restructuring LWT, but within weeks five other board members left. The ITA was unhappy at how Murdoch was able to buy his way into the company, because foreign nationals were legally blocked from owning the ITV contractors. It also demanded assurances that LWT's original programme policies and operations were sound. As a result, the ITA, concerned about Murdoch owning both a television station and significant newspaper interests, forced Murdoch from the chairmanship of LWT, and, on 9 March 1971, John Freeman, best known for presenting Face to Face for the BBC, became chairman and chief executive of LWT. He said "I expect many people are thinking I need my head examining, but I decided to take it up all the same. The public should have the kinds of programmes it wants, which means you must take into account minority interests as well as majority ones". Freeman made it quite clear that he expected to have full control within the company without any interference from Murdoch.

By early May, Freeman reappointed Cyril Bennett as Controller of Programmes, along with many of the original personnel who helped start up the company in 1967.

With these changes, LWT became influenced by the same character Murdoch's newspapers had. In time the station became regarded as a populist, conservative counterpart to the more highbrow and liberal Thames; hardly the BBC2-like ideal that Frost and Peacock had envisioned.

Audience share grew, and, in 1975, the company won seven BAFTA awards – more than the rest of ITV put together. Although the programming had changed from their original remit, LWT still produced shows which were considered more upmarket, in particular Upstairs, Downstairs. Unlike earlier offerings these attracted high audiences. LWT continued to show arts programming, mainly Aquarius and its successor The South Bank Show.

=== Improving fortunes ===
==== 1970s ====
LWT's fortunes improved, which helped increase profits, and more money was made available for new programming. In 1972, Weekend World was launched; a weekly current affairs programme broadcast on Sundays at noon, presented by journalist Peter Jay. In 1974, the Director of Programmes at Thames, Brian Tesler, left to become Deputy Chief Executive to John Freeman. In the autumn of 1974, LWT challenged the BBC by spending £3.75 million on what it believed represented the biggest range of talent and varied scheduling for viewers, including Stanley Baxter, Danny La Rue, a number of new dramas and another current affairs show, which helped push up profits to nearly £4 million.

In May 1976, LWT was reorganised to form a new company, LWT (Holdings) Limited which allowed the company to expand into a number of new ventures, including Hutchinson Publishing. The LWT Chairman & Chief Executive John Freeman said "an important factor was the deal would provide revenue from a wholly different source thus in part insulating LWT from the effects of any future adverse fluctuations in advertising revenue". In the same month he stood down as Chief Executive, and the Board appointed Brian Tesler as the company's managing director. Cyril Bennett died later that year, and Tesler doubled as the company's Director of Programmes until he appointed Michael Grade to that role in February 1977. Three decades later the official history of ITV, Independent Television in Britain, observed "Under Brian Tesler's Managing Directorship LWT was to become the success for which its founders (almost all of whom had by that time left the company) had so earnestly striven."

In November 1978, News International sold off 16% of its LWT holding, reducing its shares from 39.7% to 25%, as it believed this was going to be one of the outcomes from the Annan Report on Broadcasting. LWT also warned shareholders that heavy spending on programmes would continue to reduce chances of increased profits. News International sold its remaining 25% stake on 13 March 1980, bringing an end to LWT's connection with the Australian tycoon.

After the 1979 ITV strike, LWT was hit hard. During November 1979 LWT believed it had managed to only lose around £200,000 over the course of the dispute. Its acquisition of specialist travel and tour operator Page & Moy and its Hutchinson publishing operations helped offset the losses made during the strike. Interim reports in April 1980 highlight LWT profits reducing by £2 million. By November it became clear that LWT profits had remained roughly the same as in the previous year, even with turnover increasing from £70.5 million to £80.5 million.

==== 1980s ====
The 1982 franchise round was the first time LWT had to re-apply for its licence. The original 1968 contract was supposed to have ended in 1974. Instead, the new Independent Broadcasting Authority (IBA) had elected to extend all franchise contracts to 1981, owing to the enormous costs of introducing colour television. While it is debatable whether the licence would have been renewed if LWT had had to re-apply in 1973, by 1982, the company was in good health, and it easily beat off weak competition to secure a second contract – although it lost the Bluebell Hill transmitter near Maidstone to the new Television South, known as TVS, as part of a reorganisation prompted by the creation of the South and South East dual region. However, due to the recession, the company still had to tighten its belt. LWT had developed a reputation in many fields, including co-ordination of the ITV network's sport productions and presentation.

In January 1982, John Birt became LWT's new Director of Programmes when Michael Grade left to accept the post of Company President at Tandem Productions in the US, while Barry Cox became Head of Current Affairs. Birt's time as Programme Director resulted in a change of direction. He started overhauling the schedules, to maximise audience numbers: his measures to achieve this included moving some niche shows back out of peak time, and putting Cilla Black under contract. He criticised how ITV companies were spending huge amounts of money on local programmes and post-watershed dramas, which left a funding gap for shows broadcast between the two periods, which did not help LWT as it only had a two-and-a-half-day franchise period.

John Birt also started reviewing spending budgets for all departments to provide the best returns which resulted in The Stanley Baxter Show being cancelled. LWT also postponed and shelved a number of other productions during the early 1980s, due to cost and frustration with other ITV companies' ideas for the weekend schedules.

In 1983, Birt published a document with proposals for an additional £50 million to be spent every year on peak time programmes: shows concerning religion, the arts and current affairs would be pruned to free up cash. His argument for doing this was that ITV made 75% of its money in peak time, but the peak time was riddled with a number of weak slots which reduced the maximum amount of revenue; again, LWT was at a disadvantage compared with the other ITV franchise holders. Birt believed that LWT and others should transfer more of its public service broadcasting commitments to the new Channel 4.

LWT finally found a solution in 1985, when an agreement was reached with TVS, which wished to expand its own output for the ITV network. However, as TVS was not one of the "Big Five" ITV companies, it had no real influence on the Network Programming Committee. Under the control of Greg Dyke as Director of Programmes, TVS started to move away from its original philosophy of niche arts and science programming, and began producing more entertainment programmes. The deal helped LWT to fill its schedules with appropriate, domestically-produced programming while not having to increase its budget, while TVS was able to get more of its programmes onto the ITV network slots. TVS retained its original philosophy for its regional and children's programmes.

On 29 October 1986, London Weekend Television had acquired a majority stake in the new company, The Silverbach-Lazarus Group, which is a Los Angeles-based home video and television company, which fueled the expansion of SLG's syndication activities and the Regency Home Video branch of the Silverbach-Lazarus Group, distributing product including Entertainment Partners, Gaylord Production Company, Glen-Warren Productions, Newmark Productions, Phoenix Entertainment Group, Schaefer/Karpf Productions and Visual Productions, and decided to add offices for the Chicago branch.

In April 1987, Greg Dyke moved from TVS to LWT again to be Director of Programmes (replacing John Birt) – having originally worked at LWT in 1978, before moving to TV-am in 1983 and TVS in 1985. At the same time, LWT started re-sectioning the company in a bid to cut costs and overhaul the working practices within the company ahead of a new franchise period.

As part of the cost-cutting review, the idea was floated that LWT could become a "commissioning" organisation – similar to Channel 4 – with its programme production operations being sold off to a new company, in a bid to "sharpen up its competitiveness". Consultancy company NERA was brought in to investigate the matter. The plan was halted in early 1988, as LWT chairman Christopher Bland, along with Greg Dyke, started to streamline operations; over four years, more than 690 people were made redundant, whole layers of management were scrapped and working practices were overhauled. But with the plan still a possibility, Dyke was able to offer lavish redundancy payments, ultimately getting the changes through.

Greg Dyke explained: "To completely restructure your business for less than a year's profits is a good deal. I have no problem with that." Another change was to make production operations a profit centre, with studios to rent – and with various uses from Jonathan Ross shows to sales conferences. These operations continue to earn millions a year for ITV.

In the late 1980s, LWT moved into backing films including A Handful of Dust (1988) and The Tall Guy (1989).

==== 1990s and takeover ====
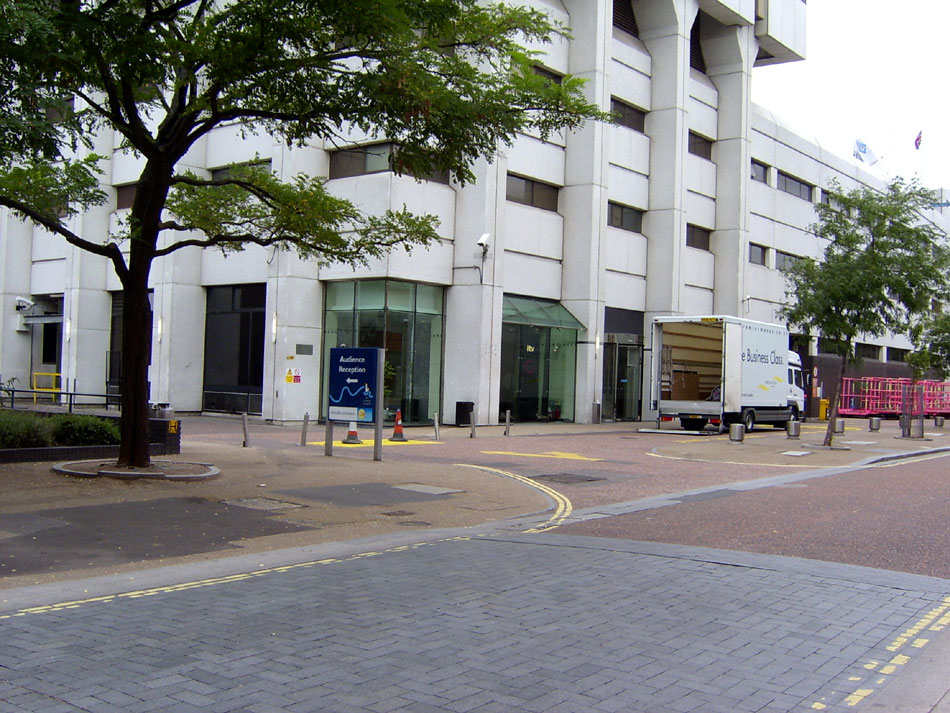
The London Studios (LWT's HQ, later went to ITV before closure in April 2018)

In 1990 LWT created the second ITV Sales company Laser Sales, to deal with its own and TVS's advertising operations. The Broadcasting Act 1990 brought changes to the way ITV contracts were awarded. No longer a 'beauty-contest', but rather a blind auction, where the winner was to be the applicant who bid the most. LWT threatened not to bid for its franchise again, as opposition to the new franchise bidding process gathered momentum. LWT chairman Christopher Bland stated: "We have the programme power into satellite" – it cost both LWT and Thames £43 million for the licence, yet on satellite television would only cost £2 million. LWT denied it was trying to blackmail the government, but admitted the threat of some of the largest contractors packing their bags might make government think again.

The controversy led to the introduction of a 'quality threshold' which allowed that, in exceptional circumstances, a bid could be rejected if it were deemed excessive, or that an incumbent could be chosen against a higher-bidding applicant if it were felt that incumbent's programming was 'exceptional'. As described by LWT's managing director Greg Dyke, the franchise round, "became a crapshoot. You had to work out [in the franchise round] who was bidding against you. Of those, would they pass the quality threshold and would they pass the financial test". Scottish Television and Central Television both discovered that nobody was bidding against them—and both bid only a token amount.

It was the 'quality threshold' that saved LWT. Despite streamlining, and a successful conflict with trade unions, LWT knew that if it were to keep on making quality programmes, it could not over-bid. It had to rely on the quality of its programmes and submit the best offer it could, knowing it could be far less than a rival bid; the strategy worked, and LWT won a third contract with an annual bid of £7.5 million, against a rival who bid £36 million but whose plans were deemed by the new Independent Television Commission to be unsatisfactory.

LWT's weekday rival, Thames Television, lost its licence, outbid by Carlton. It was told it could not fall back on its long history of programme-making. After 24 years of existence, LWT survived the station that was its biggest rival. LWT would have a much better relationship with Carlton, and shared many operations including transmission facilities and studio space, and each owning 20% of GMTV, but most notably creating a joint news service, London News Network, to provide regional news programming across the whole week.

From 1993, LWT's low bid made it attractive to others wishing to take it over. Originally, Greg Dyke had planned to use LWT as a springboard to start acquiring companies to build a united ITV. On 6 December 1993, the north-west England franchise-holder Granada Television launched a hostile takeover for the company, worth £600 million. The takeover bid came about owing to the relaxation of the rules governing the ITV network. LWT tried to outstep the takeover bid with talks being held with Yorkshire Television and Scottish Television. A week later a conflict of words had broken out between LWT and Granada, with Granada claiming the YTV-LWT deal was "Something cobbled together by desperate men". Gerry Robinson, the Chairman of Granada plc, was also surprised if LWT went ahead with a bid for YTV, especially since it had made £10 million losses that week and was already paying much of its revenue to the government. Reports also suggested if LWT bid for Yorkshire Television it would also form an alliance with Anglia who would takeover Tyne Tees Television. By New Year's Eve, Granada had increased its bid to £658 million.

By 7 January 1994, the merger talks between Yorkshire-Tyne Tees Television had collapsed because it had proved impossible to reach an agreement on a suitable structure for the new company. A few days earlier Anglia had withdrawn from the proposed alliance, making an LWT takeover of YTV impossible. By 7 February 1994, Granada had increase its takeover bid again to £774 million, but the LWT board once again rejected the offer. Granada's Chief Executive, Gerry Robinson, said: "We are obviously disappointed that having evidently accepted the commercial argument in favour of scale, the board of LWT has not been able to recommend what is a generous offer." Sir Christopher Bland rejected this statement, claiming "the Granada offer is inadequate and still fails to reflect the true value of LWT". On 25 February 1994, LWT had succumbed to Granada's £770 million bid for the company. This resulted in Greg Dyke and Sir Christopher Bland leaving LWT.

==== ITV London ====
By 2001, Carlton and Granada controlled all of the franchises in England and Wales, and in 2002 decided to unify the playout and branding of all of the companies to become ITV1, with regional references used only in accordance with regional programming. LWT marked its final day on air with a series of tributes to LWT's past, with long-serving continuity announcers Glen Thompsett and Trish Bertram appearing in-vision in LWT's playout centre in the London Television Centre. When GMTV handed over to the weekday franchise the following morning, the national ITV1 brand was on-air, with the new team of network continuity announcers announcing for the first time; former Meridian Broadcasting announcer Paul Seed was the first network voice.

The operations of LWT and Carlton Television were merged to become ITV London, a 7-day service. Unlike the other English and Welsh franchises, ITV London did not receive regional idents featuring the London name until the 2003 refresh; only one of these idents was ever used at a single junction from launch. Apart from this rare occasion, the channel was only known verbally as "ITV1 London" prior to regional programmes only. In February 2004 Granada and Carlton completed their merger to become ITV plc, owning eleven of the fifteen ITV regional franchises.

The LWT logo continued to appear at the end of its programmes until 31 October 2004. However, from 1 November, it was replaced by the new Granada Productions endcap, with programmes either credited as "A Granada London Production", or "A Granada Production" instead. On 16 January 2006, all network productions produced by any ITV plc-owned company were branded as "ITV Productions", which since March 2009 has been rebranded as "ITV Studios".

== Studios ==
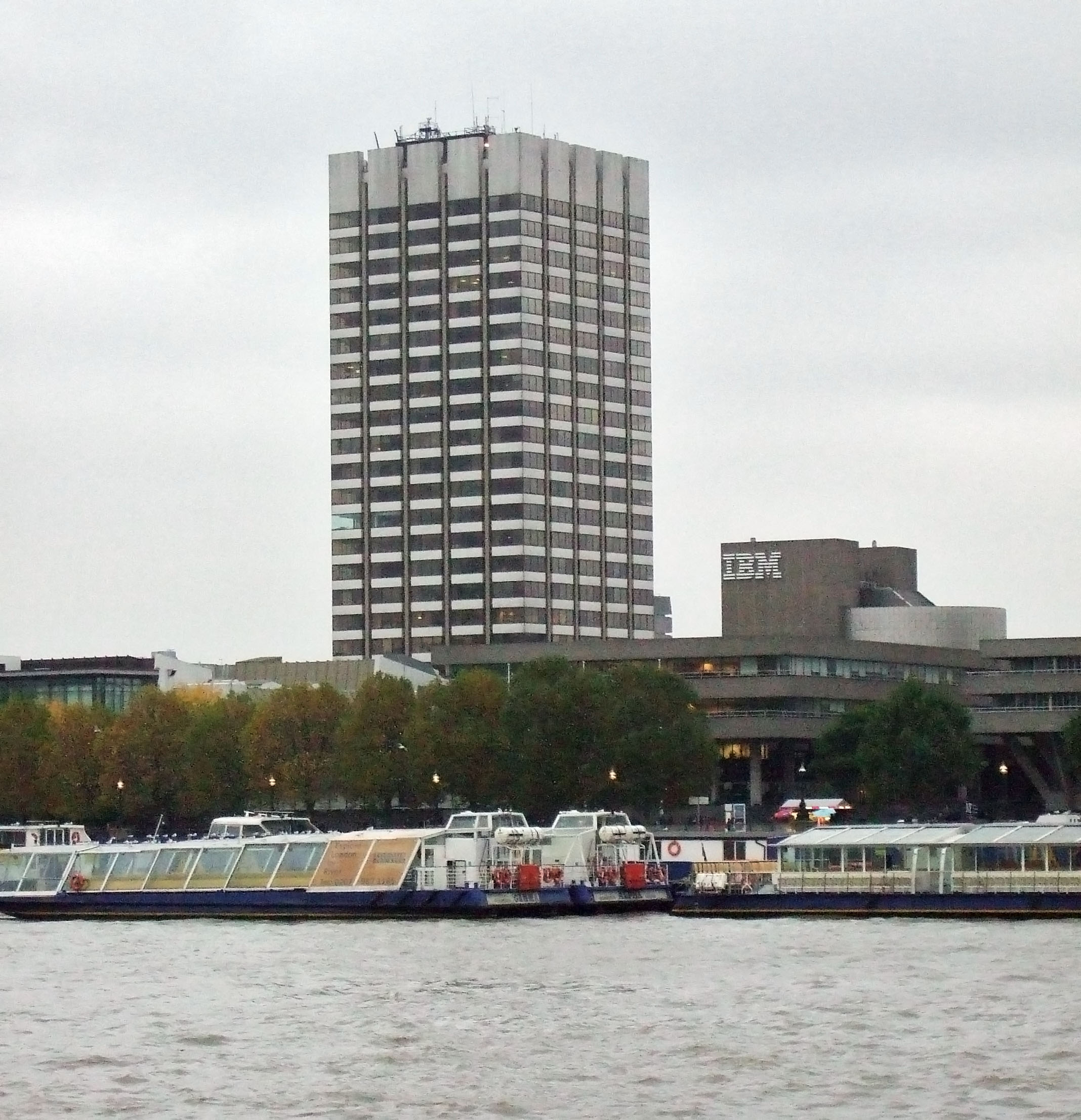
The London Studios, seen from across the River Thames

LWT's first studio base was the former home of Associated-Rediffusion, the previous London Weekday franchise holder in Wembley (see Fountain Studios). The Wembley studios were problematic, as their costly conversions to colour was imminent. LWT only had to use Wembley until its new purpose-built studios were opened in 1972.

The new studios, called South Bank Television Centre, included a large tower block named Kent House after the Duchess of Kent who officially opened the complex. It was built on a plot of land named King's Reach. The studios' network ident was KRS, for King's Reach Studios. These facilities were considered at the time the best colour studios in Europe. In 1992 the complex was renamed London Television Centre, and became the centre of ITV plc's studio operations and the chief production centre until closing in 2018.

== Continuity announcers ==
Ruth Anders, Sue Peacock, Trish Bertram, Keith Harrison, Robin Houston, Pam Royle, Alec Taylor, Glen Thompsett, Annie St John and Peter Lewis served as continuity announcers for LWT.

== Presentation ==
LWT's initial on-screen look featured the name London Weekend Television in white zooming in on a black background accompanied by an electronic jingle; some shows, such as On the Buses, used only a still caption "From London Weekend Television", either in silence, or over the start of the show's theme music. This was replaced the following year by an ident featuring a rotating disc (a stylised laurel wreath) on screen against a grey (later orange) background with the caption in the centre accompanied by a simple acoustic ident theme. The "Television" part of the name was dropped on-screen, with LWT merely called "London Weekend".

LWT's most recognisable identity – the 'River' – was introduced on Friday 18 September 1970, featuring a stripe made up of blue, white and red moving across the black background in the shape of an 'L' and 'W'; the 'Television' part of the name remained absent. Designed by graphics designer Terry Griffiths, his modified version introduced on 1 September 1978 revived the full name; at the end, the river sections snapped down into the striped LWT logo. The ident jingle, composed by Harry Rabinowitz, was also remixed.

LWT dropped in-vision announcers in January 1983, and on Friday 9 September that year, introduced a new local CGI ident, bearing the company slogan 'Your Weekend ITV', with an additional ident appearing in 1984.

On Friday 29 August 1986, a new set of CGI idents by The Computer Film Company aired for the first time:

- Genesis, in which the stripes fold on letter by letter, seen on networked productions until December 1987.
- Solari, a vertical venetian blind effect seen in the London region only.

A separate cel-animated ident for children's programmes was also used, accompanied by a different version of the station's ident theme.

On 1 September 1989, LWT adopted the first ITV generic look and retained it until 30 August 1992, with their three coloured stripes featuring in their segment of the corporate ITV logo. The 1986 'Solari' ident returned during 1991/1992 to introduce local programming.

LWT replaced the 1989 ITV generic ident on 4 September 1992 with a large 3D logo forming from the left to a remixed version of the generic music, with two versions: 'Flying Blocks' and 'Flare'. On 30 August 1996, an updated ident and logo was introduced, splitting the river colours of red, white and blue on the individual respective letters, 'L', 'W' and 'T', with six different versions. On 12 November 1999, LWT adopted the second ITV generic look, based on the theme of hearts. LWT was the only company to drop this look on 24 March 2000, replacing it with the theme of a video wall. The first version of the ident had two problems: the colour scheme was in essence primarily red, and the soundtrack theme consisted of electronic beeps. This ident was altered from July 2000, reducing the red colour scheme and featuring a significantly remixed soundtrack, and another revision on 11 August 2001 included the new ITV1 logo and, from November that year, the itv.com website as well.

By 2001, Carlton and Granada controlled all of the franchises in England and Wales, and in 2002 decided to unify the playout and branding of all of the companies to become ITV1, with regional references used only in accordance with regional programming. LWT marked its final day on air with a series of tributes to LWT's past, beginning with an authentic startup routine leading into the ITV Morning News. All elements of the startup were recreated in Macromedia Flash and in the 16:9 aspect ratio, created by Dave Jeffery. Later that day, a recreation of LWT's famous River ident would lead into The South Bank Show, which would be the last programme broadcast under the LWT name. The show was followed by a final signoff featuring continuity announcers Glen Thompsett and Trish Bertram appearing 'in-vision' to toast the departing station, and a montage of LWT presentation across the years, assembled by senior ITV presentation producer Gareth Randall.

When GMTV handed over to the weekday franchise the following morning, the national ITV1 brand was on-air, with the new team of announcers announcing for the first time; former Meridian announcer Paul Seed was the first network voice. The operations of LWT and Carlton Television were merged to become ITV London, a seven-day service. Unlike the other English and Welsh franchises, ITV London did not receive regional idents featuring the London name until the 2003 refresh; only one of these idents was ever used at a single junction from launch. Apart from this rare occasion, the channel was only known verbally as "ITV1 London" prior to regional programmes only.

On 2 February 2004, Granada and Carlton completed their merger to become ITV plc, holding eleven of the fifteen ITV regional franchises. The LWT logo continued to appear at the end of its programmes until 31 October 2004. From 1 November, the end caption (endcap) was replaced by a Granada endcap, with programmes either credited as "A Granada London Production", or "A Granada Production" instead. From 16 January 2006, all network productions produced by any ITV plc-owned company carried an "ITV Productions" endcap, and then from March 2009 adopted the "ITV Studios" brand.

== Programmes ==
=== Programmes ===
LWT was among the "Big Five" franchises that provided much of the ITV schedule. Notable early shows included We Have Ways of Making You Laugh (a sketch show starring Frank Muir which was due to be the first programme scheduled to be aired on LWT, but industrial action blacked it out early in the first show); the children's fantasy Catweazle; and several sitcoms, including the popular No, Honestly, On the Buses, Please Sir!, Me and My Girl and Mind Your Language, and cult favourites such as End of Part One, Whoops Apocalypse and Hot Metal. The channel also created the comedy-clips format with It'll Be Alright on the Night, Clive James on Television and Game for a Laugh; the latter in turn spawned Beadle's About and You've Been Framed!.

Although as a weekend station, LWT tended to concentrate on lighter material than its weekday neighbours Thames and Carlton, it did produce a number of successful drama series too. Within These Walls was a prison drama starring Googie Withers; Lillie was based on the real-life story of Lillie Langtry (with Francesca Annis reprising the role from ATV's Edward the Seventh); and The Gentle Touch, starring Jill Gascoine, was the UK's first drama series with a female police detective as the lead role. However, by far the station's most successful drama was Upstairs, Downstairs, a successful attempt to produce a costume drama comparable in scale to BBC1's The Forsyte Saga.

Neither did LWT neglect other responsibilities; it established the long-running Sunday lunchtime political series Weekend World and a variety of regional programmes including award-winning current affairs series The London Programme and the light-hearted magazine show The Six O'Clock Show. It also pioneered multicultural programming via the work of the in-house London Minorities Unit, which produced Gay Life, the world's first gay television series, and the youth documentary series Twentieth Century Box. The company also became heavily involved in social action with the use of on-air and off-air campaigns by the London Community Unit (LCU), later relaunched as LWT Action.

The Sports Department at LWT featured programmes such as World of Sport which ran for 20 years on a Saturday afternoon and was billed as ITV's answer to BBC1's Grandstand. Other shows included Saint and Greavsie, On the Ball, and The Big Match (renamed The Match between 1988 and 1992). The latter two shows were hosted for many years by ITV's main football commentator Brian Moore.

Major programmes on LWT included most of ITV's weekend line-up, which included gameshows and comedies like Friday- and Saturday-night favourites Play Your Cards Right, The Two of Us, Square Deal, Close to Home, The Piglet Files, Second Thoughts, Faith in the Future, Popstars: The Rivals, Surprise Surprise, You Bet!, The Moment of Truth, Blind Date, Gladiators, The Big Big Talent Show, Barrymore, My Kind of Music and Don't Try This at Home, and long-running Sunday night drama series Agatha Christie's Poirot, Forever Green, The Knock and London's Burning. Nigel Lythgoe, who won infamy as a judge on ITV's pop talent show Popstars and now appears on the BBC's So You Think You Can Dance, is a former controller of entertainment at the company, working as an executive producer on many of the station's top-rating programmes during the 1990s and early 2000s. LWT also owned 50% of London News Network Limited, producers until February 2004 of the news programmes London Today and London Tonight; regional news for London is now produced by ITN and known as ITV News London.

=== Regional news programmes ===
From 1982 until it launched a proper news service of its own in 1988, LWT also showed Thames Weekend News, produced by Thames Television, on Friday evenings, until December 1987.

- LWT News Headlines (1982–1988)
- LWT News (1988–1993)
- London Tonight (1993–2002; continues on ITV London)

== See also ==
- Carlton Television
- GMTV
- London News Network
- Rutland Weekend Television
- Thames Television

== Notes ==
ITV regional service
Preceded by ATV London	London (weekends); 2 August 1968 – 27 October 2002	Succeeded by ITV London
