= Thames News =

Former flagship regional news programme of Thames Television

- Final logo, used from 3 September 1990 – 31 December 1992.
- Also known as: Thames at Six; Thames Weekend News
- Genre: News, London (regional)
- Presented by: Various, including: Rita Carter; Steve Clarke; Andrew Gardner; Robin Houston; Tricia Ingrams; Graham Miller; Penny Smith
- Country of origin: United Kingdom
- Original language: English

Production
- Running time: Main bulletin: 30 minutes Other bulletins: Times vary
- Production company: Thames Television

Original release
- Network: Thames Television
- Release: 12 September 1977 – 31 December 1992

Related
- Today; London Tonight

Thames News is the flagship regional news programme of Thames Television, serving the Thames ITV region and broadcast on weekdays from 12 September 1977 to 31 December 1992.

The news service was produced and broadcast from Thames TV's headquarters at Euston Road in north-west London and, during its last few years in operation, from district newsrooms in Dartford in Kent, Guildford in Surrey and Watford in Hertfordshire.

== History ==
=== Today and launch of Thames News ===
Prior to Thames News, the station opted not to provide a conventional local news service in spite of requests from the Independent Television Authority to improve on Rediffusion's scant levels of regional output.

Instead, Thames produced Today, a local current affairs magazine show presented chiefly on alternating nights by Bob Holness, Eamonn Andrews and Bill Grundy. The programme was axed in the summer of 1977, several months after Grundy's on-air interview with The Sex Pistols.

Today was replaced on Monday, 12 September 1977 by Thames at Six, a more conventional news magazine programme, presented by former ITN newscaster Andrew Gardner. The following year saw Thames establish a full strength newsroom, enabling daily coverage of London-specific news for the first time .

A lunchtime Thames News bulletin, presented by Robin Houston, was launched on Tuesday 5 September 1978. A late night bulletin, broadcast after News at Ten, was due to launch on the same day, but was held back until Monday 28 April 1980 because of union problems. During 1979, the main evening programme was renamed as Thames News.

=== Thames Weekend News ===
On New Year's Day – Friday, 1 January 1982 – Thames and its weekend counterpart London Weekend Television (LWT) began new franchise periods, and at the same time, the weekly handover from Thames to LWT was brought forward from 7pm to 5.15pm on Friday nights.

Prior to the change, Thames aired a full Friday evening edition of Thames News at 6pm, followed by Thames Sport at 6:30pm, but after the franchise renewals, LWT was reluctant to start a weekend news service, despite pressure from the Independent Broadcasting Authority, which had also suggested introducing a single seven-day service co-produced by both companies. LWT director of programmes, Michael Grade, described the idea as "impractical for various reasons".

Therefore, Thames produced special Thames Weekend News bulletins for broadcast on Friday evenings, including a 15-minute round-up during LWT's light-hearted magazine programme The Six O'Clock Show, with LWT paying Thames a reported £500,000 (£1.8 million in 2024) a year to provide 16 minutes of local news on Friday evenings.

The arrangement ended in January 1988 when LWT launched a full strength local news service, provided by Screen News and later, Chrysalis Television.

=== Goodbye from Thames News ===
On Wednesday, 16 October 1991, Thames Television learned it would lose its ITV franchise to serve London during the weekdays to Carlton Television, which joined up with London Weekend Television to form London News Network, a new seven-day news service for the capital.

Thames News produced its final full-length programme on Wednesday, 23 December 1992, presented by Steve Clarke (a former presenter of the BBC's rival BBC London Plus programme) and Gytha Hutton (a reporter based in Thames' Guildford newsroom). The very last bulletin was broadcast on New Year's Eve, Thursday, 31 December 1992 and presented by regular sports anchor Graham Miller. The bulletin closed with the town crier of London, Peter Moore, announcing the end of Thames News after 15 years.

== Thames News on-air team ==
- John Andrew (reporter/presenter, late 1980s)
- Rita Carter (reporter/presenter, 1978–1986)
- Lindsay Charlton (reporter/presenter, mid–late 1980s)
- Steve Clarke (presenter, 1990–1992)
- Teresa Driscoll (reporter/presenter, late 1980s–1990)
- Richard Edgar (weather presenter, 1988 & 1989)
- Tim Ewart (reporter, 1980 & 1981)
- Andrew Gardner (presenter, 1977–92)
- Paul Greene (reporter/presenter, mid-1980s–1992)
- Robin Houston (presenter, 1978–1992)
- Gytha Hutton (reporter/presenter, 1990–1992)
- Tricia Ingrams (reporter/presenter, early 1980s–1992)
- Tina Jenkins (reporter/presenter, 1983–1986)
- Graham Miller (sports presenter/relief newsreader, late 1980s–1992)
- Roger Parry (reporter/presenter, 1980s)
- Liz Pike (reporter/presenter, 1989–1992)
- Marcus Powell (reporter/presenter, 1986–1988)
- Jack Scott (weather presenter, 1983–1988)
- Penny Smith (reporter/presenter, 1988 & 1989)
- Kerry Swain (reporter/presenter, 1989–1992)
- Marc Wadsworth (reporter/presenter, 1982–1992)
- Francis Wilson (weather presenter, 1978–1983)
