= ITV News London =

News

- The ITV News London title card with a close-up of the London Eye.
- Also known as: Good Morning London; London Tonight (1993–2013); London Today (1993–2013)
- Genre: Regional news
- Presented by: Charlene White; Lucrezia Millarini; Yasmin Bodalbhai; Ronke Phillips; Carolyn Sim
- Country of origin: United Kingdom
- Original language: English

Production
- Production locations: ITN Studios, Gray's Inn Road, London, England
- Camera setup: Multi-camera
- Running time: 30 minutes (18:00 broadcast)
- Production companies: London News Network (1993–2004); ITN (2004–present)

Original release
- Network: ITV1 (ITV London)
- Release: 4 January 1993 – present

Related
- ITV News; ITV Weather; The Late Debate; LWT News (1982-1993); Thames News (1977-1992)

ITV News London is a British television news service broadcast on ITV London and ITVX. It is produced by ITN.

== History ==
=== London News Network ===
The programme launched on Monday 4 January 1993 as London Tonight, after Carlton Television won the London weekday franchise from previous holder Thames Television. London Tonight was originally produced by London News Network – a joint venture between Carlton and LWT designed to provide a sole ITV regional news service for the London area, broadcasting seven days a week. Its creation established a continuity between the once separate services and presentation of the weekend and weekday news, weather and sport in the region, previously provided by Thames News and LWT News.

The flagship programme, initially an hour-long and presented by Alastair Stewart and Fiona Foster, was supplemented by shorter London Today bulletins, launched on 4 January 1993 (LWT discontinued its own local news service the previous weekend). The main evening programme was reduced to 30 minutes a year later, while from 25 November 1996 to September 2002, a half-hour lunchtime edition of London Today was broadcast on weekdays. In addition to regional news, London News Network also produced a wide range of regional programming for both Carlton and LWT as well as providing transmission services for both stations.

=== ITN ===
In 2004, ITV London owners Carlton and Granada merged, forming ITV plc with LNN being dissolved soon after. Production for all ITV London News programming remained at The London Studios (formerly known as the LWT South Bank Centre) until 29 February 2004, when it was taken over by the national Channel 3 news provider ITN and moved to their headquarters in Central London, making the region the only operation not to produce its own news programmes in-house. Around 40 jobs were lost with the closure of LNN, although the programme retained its own editorial team. London Tonight was unaffected by the ITV regional news cuts in February 2009.

On 4 July 2012, ITV News editor Deborah Turness informed London Tonight employees a third of staff would be made redundant, with ITV News and London Tonight both sharing newsgathering and studios from 1 October 2012.

On Monday 14 January 2013, the service was relaunched and renamed as ITV News London.

Former notable lead presenters include Katie Derham, Fiona Foster, Nina Hossain, Natasha Kaplinsky, Anna Maria Ashe, Donal MacIntyre, Mary Nightingale, Alastair Stewart and Matt Teale.

Preceded by BBC Midlands Today	RTS: Television Journalism; Regional Daily News Magazine; 1999	Succeeded by BBC Look North
Preceded by Frontline Scotland: The Ghost of Piper Alpha	RTS: Television Journalism; Regional Current Affairs (Soho Bombing); 2000	Succeeded by Spotlight: Life and Death of an IRA Quartermaster
Preceded by BBC South East Today	RTS: Television Journalism; Nations and Regions News (Grenfell Tower); 2018	Succeeded by ITV News Central (Leicester Helicopter Crash - A City In Mourning)
