= London News Network =

Television news production company

London News Network (London Sports Network)
- Type: Regional news and current affairs; National sport
- Predecessor: Thames; LWT
- Founded: 24 April 1992; 34 years ago
- Defunct: 29 February 2004; 22 years ago
- Fate: Defunct
- Successor: ITV News (ITN); ITV Sport
- Headquarters: London, United Kingdom
- Area served: News: Greater London; Sport: United Kingdom
- Owner: Carlton Television; London Weekend Television
- Parent: ITV plc

London News Network (or LNN) was a television news, production and facilities organisation in London. It was created on 24 April 1992 as a joint operation between London's two ITV contractors, Carlton Television and London Weekend Television, with each company holding a 50% stake.

== Overview ==
After weeks of shadowing Thames and LWT, LNN debuted on air on 1 January 1993 as Carlton replaced Thames Television as London's weekday ITV franchise. The company's flagship programme, London Tonight launched three days later, replacing the previous separate news services provided by Thames and LWT.

The company's headquarters were located at The London Television Centre on the South Bank (home to LWT and The London Studios). A view of the London skyline, including St. Paul's Cathedral, could be seen from the window set of Studio 7, the main news studio.

LNN continued production of London Tonight (and London Today) until 2004, when ITN took over those responsibilities. The final edition of London Tonight produced by LNN was broadcast on 29 February 2004, following which, its news operation was absorbed into ITN. At the same time, the set and visual style of the programme altered to match, more closely, the new corporate ITV News branding. The final programme produced by LNN was The Week on 7 March 2004 and the programme ended with the original LNN Production graphic from the 1993 launch. However the ITV Weather contract continued well into April. The transmission business continued at The London Television Centre, albeit under the aegis of the Southern Transmission Centre (now managed by Technicolor Network Services, at its UK headquarters in Chiswick).

== Programming ==
LNN's core programmes were London Today and the flagship evening programme London Tonight, produced seven days a week for Carlton and LWT (the first time ITV had offered a single seven-day news service for the capital).

Although primarily a news provider, LNN also produced non-news regional output for both its joint owners – ranging from current affairs (The London Programme), documentaries (First Edition) and features (After 5, The Weekend Show) to entertainment (Boot Sale Challenge, Big Screen), arts (Good Stuff) and children's programming (The Totally Friday Show, Food Factory) through its "LNN Factuals" division. It also produced a small amount of programming for other broadcasters. Sports programming was also often produced for the London region, the Meridian region and the ITV network by LNN's sport division, known as "LSN/London Sports Network". LSN also maintained the ITV Sport archive and was the production partner (with Central) on ITV's football coverage, as well as other sports. LSN and Central's sports department (by now controlled and branded Carlton) were merged in 2006, forming ITV Sport Productions, now under the control of ITV director of sport Niall Sloane.

=== List of programmes produced ===
- After 5 (1994–1996)
- The Big Screen (1998–2002)
- Boot Sale Challenge (1998–2004)
- Breakaways (1994–1996)
- Capital Gains (2001–2002)
- Crime Monthly (2000–2002)
- Crosstalk (1993–1998)
- First Edition (1997–2002)
- Goals Extra (1999–2001)
- Good Stuff (1996–1998)
- London Decides / Votes
- London Today
- London Tonight
- Planet Nosh (1998)
- Russell Grant's Sporting Heroes (2001)
- Secret City (1999–2001)
- Seven Days (2001–2002)
- Soccer Sunday (2000–2004)
- The Totally Friday Show (1996–1997)
- TravelTalk (2000)
- Vin Ordinaire (1998)
- Wannabe (1997–2000)
- The Week (2002–2004)
- The Weekend Show (1998–1999)

== Transmission ==
Aside from merging the production of news and other programming for the region into the new venture, LWT and Carlton took the view that instead of having two transmission centres in different buildings, neither on air at the same time as the other, it would make financial sense for the transmission departments to be merged as part of the new company. To that end, from the start in 1993, LNN took over responsibility for the transmission of Carlton and LWT to the viewer at home.

The companies stopped short of handing over full control of presentation and scheduling, however, and planning and scheduling staff, along with the continuity announcers (the "voices" of the stations), were retained separately by Carlton and LWT. This meant that, uniquely for the time, the transmission controllers (later "network directors" – a change only in name) and the continuity announcers worked for different companies and answered to different management.

Carlton and LWT effectively shared the position of what was known as "nominated contractor" in the ITV network. The responsibilities of this ranged from contingency planning and coordinating the network's response to, for example, major breaking news to the provision of the "network feed", this being the "clean" feed of programmes to all the other contractors in the ITV Network. To this end, LNN operated two transmission feeds: one to the London transmitter at Crystal Palace and its dependent relays, and another to the other ITV control rooms around the country. The latter was provided without announcements, commercials or interstitial material (except during times of a "presented feed", such as during the shared overnight service). The network feed was known as "KRS-17/67" – referring to the circuits (17 the original analogue and 67 the latterday digital) allocated to it by BT Broadcast between the South Bank and the BT Tower (The London Television Centre stands on a stretch of the South Bank known as the "King's Reach", and "KRS" an abbreviation for "King's Reach Studios"). LNN also assumed responsibility for ITV Night Time programming beginning in 1995, with the night time services run by other ITV companies - except those in Scotland - gradually handing over control to LNN in the years afterward.

The LNN transmission department has latterly been absorbed into the merged ITV plc as the Southern Transmission Centre, the management and operation of which has been outsourced to Technicolor Network Services. As a result, playout has now left LWT's London Television Centre and has been relocated to Technicolor Network Services' hi-tech, HD capable broadcast centre in Chiswick.
