= British Rail Class 800 =

Bi-mode multiple unit train

British Rail Class 800 Intercity Express Train Azuma
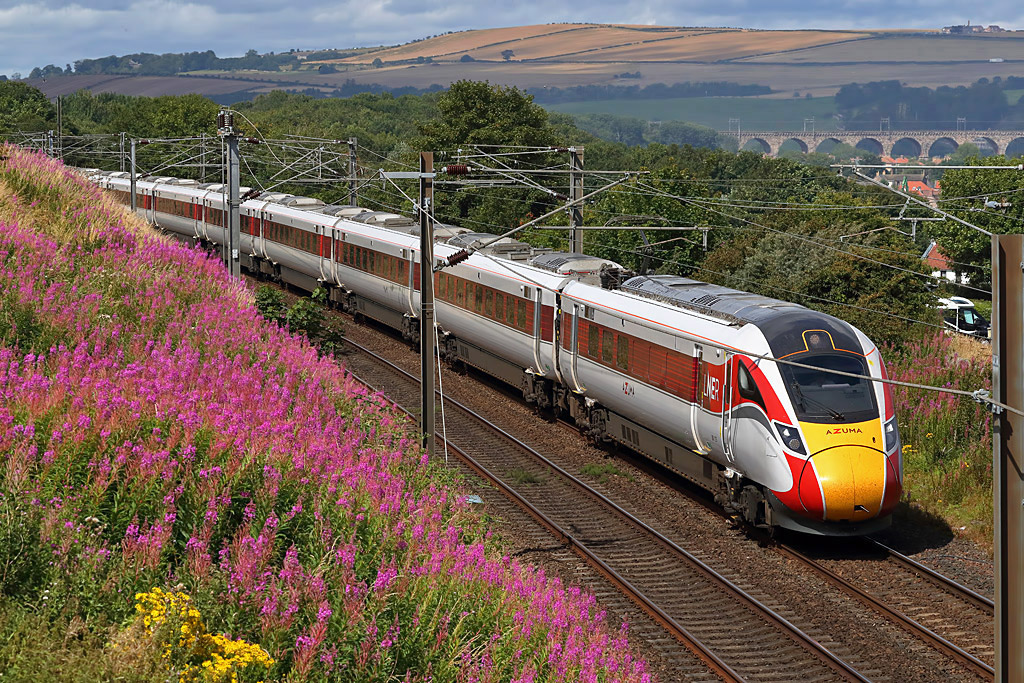
- LNER Class 800 unit passing Spittal, outside Berwick-upon-Tweed

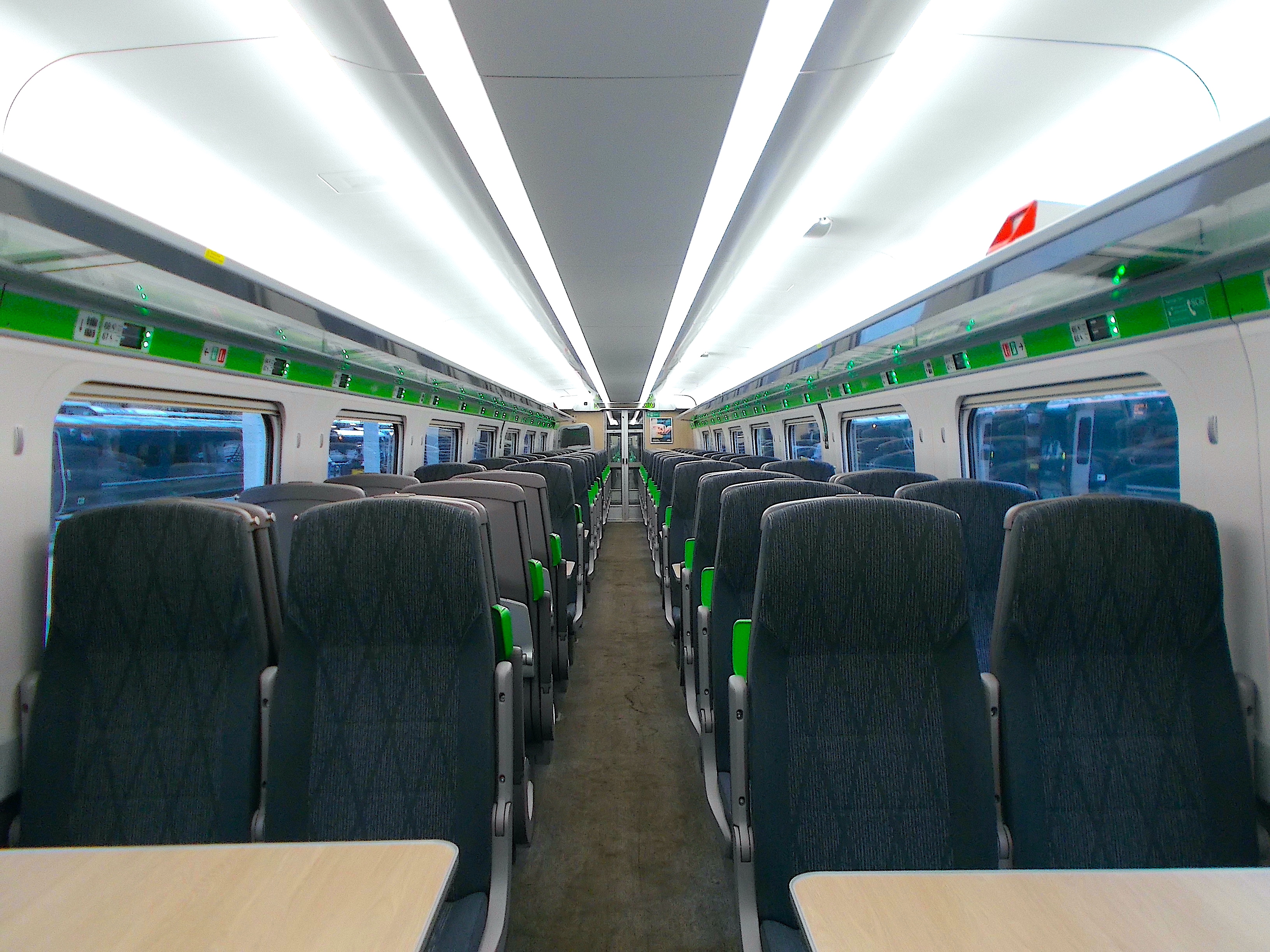
- The standard-class interior of a Great Western Railway Class 800 unit
- Stock type: Electro-diesel multiple unit
- In service: 16 October 2017 – present
- Manufacturer: Hitachi Rail
- Built at: Kasado Works, Kudamatsu, Japan; Newton Aycliffe Manufacturing Facility, England
- Family name: AT300
- Replaced: Class 180; InterCity 125; InterCity 225
- Constructed: 2014–2018
- Entered service: 16 October 2017 (GWR); 14 May 2019 (LNER)
- Number built: 36 × 800/0; 13 × 800/1; 10 × 800/2; 21 × 800/3
- Formation: 5 cars per 800/0 and 800/2 unit: DPTS-MS-MS-MC-DPTF; 9 cars per 800/1 and 800/3 unit: DPTS-MS-MS-TS-MS-TS-MC-MF-DPTF
- Fleet numbers: 800/0: 800001–800036; 800/1: 800101–800113; 800/2: 800201–800210; 800/3: 800301–800321
- Capacity: 800/0: 326 seats (36 first class, 290 standard); 800/1: 596 seats (102 first class, 494 standard); 800/2: 302 seats (48 first class, 254 standard); 800/3: 650 seats (70 first class, 580 standard)
- Owner: Agility Trains
- Operators: Great Western Railway; London North Eastern Railway
- Depots: GWR: North Pole, Stoke Gifford, Swansea Maliphant; LNER: Bounds Green, Craigentinny, Doncaster Carr, Neville Hill
- Lines served: East Coast Main Line; Great Western Main Line

Specifications
- Car body construction: Aluminium
- Train length: 5-car units: 129.7 m (425 ft 6 in); 9-car units: 233.7 m (766 ft 9 in)
- Car length: Driving vehicles: 25.850 m (84 ft 9.7 in); Intermediate vehicles: 26.000 m (85 ft 3.6 in)
- Width: 2.7 m (8 ft 10 in)
- Doors: Single-leaf pocket sliding; (2 per side per car)
- Maximum speed: 125 mph (200 km/h)
- Weight: 5-car units: 243 tonnes (239 long tons; 268 short tons); 9-car units: 438 tonnes (431 long tons; 483 short tons)
- Axle load: Motor cars: 15 tonnes (14.8 long tons; 16.5 short tons); Trailer cars: 13 tonnes (12.8 long tons; 14.3 short tons)
- Traction system: Hitachi IGBT
- Prime movers: 3 or 5 × MTU 12V 1600 R80L; (3 per 5-car unit, 5 per 9-car unit)
- Engine type: V12 four-stroke turbo-diesel with SCR
- Displacement: 21 L (1,284 cu in) per engine
- Power output: Per engine: GWR: 700 kW (940 hp); LNER: 560 kW (750 hp) (Note: All units were delivered with engines down-rated from 700 to 560 kW (940 to 750 hp), for contractual reasons. The down-rating was removed from engines aboard GWR units by the end of 2018.)
- Acceleration: 0.7 m/s^{2} (1.6 mph/s)
- Deceleration: Service: 1.0 m/s^{2} (2.2 mph/s); Emergency: 1.2 m/s^{2} (2.7 mph/s)
- Electric system: 25 kV 50 Hz AC overhead
- Current collection: Pantograph
- UIC classification: 5-car units: 2′2′+Bo′Bo′+Bo′Bo′+Bo′Bo′+2′2′; 9-car units: 2′2′+Bo′Bo′+Bo′Bo′+2′2′+Bo′Bo′+2′2′+Bo′Bo′+Bo′Bo′+2′2′
- Braking systems: Electro-pneumatic (disc) and regenerative
- Safety systems: AWS; BR ATP (GWR units only); ETCS; TPWS
- Coupling system: Dellner 10
- Multiple working: Within class and Class 801 and Class 802
- Track gauge: 1,435 mm (4 ft 8 1/2 in) standard gauge

The British Rail Class 800, branded as the Intercity Express Train (IET) by Great Western Railway (GWR) and Azuma by London North Eastern Railway (LNER), is a bi-mode multiple unit train built by Hitachi Rail for GWR and LNER. The train is a part of the Hitachi AT300 series, and can be powered by both overhead electric wires and underfloor diesel generators for use on non-electrified railways.

The Class 800 was developed and produced, alongside an electric-only Class 801 variant, as part of the Intercity Express Programme (IEP) to procure replacements for the InterCity 125 and InterCity 225 fleets of high speed trains. The trains were manufactured by Hitachi between 2014 and 2018, being assembled at Hitachi's Newton Aycliffe Manufacturing Facility using bodyshells shipped from the company's Kasado Works in Japan.

The Class 800 trains came into service on the Great Western Main Line on 16 October 2017, while the first examples on the East Coast Main Line were put into service on 15 May 2019. Early operations have been troubled by fatigue cracking and corrosion on the aluminium vehicle body shells, particularly on the yaw dampers.

== Background ==
GWR 800011 at Steventon Causeway Level Crossing in Oxfordshire

As part of the UK Government's Intercity Express Programme (IEP), the Class 800 units were built as partial replacements for the InterCity 125 trains, which at the time operated services on the Great Western Main Line and the East Coast Main Line, as well as the InterCity 225 trains, which currently operate services on the East Coast Main Line. The scheme drew heavily upon the preceding British Rail Class 395 high speed trains produced for Southeastern. A total of 80 train sets have been constructed, comprising 36 five-car and 21 nine-car units intended for operation with Great Western Railway (GWR), along with 10 five-car and 13 nine-car with London North Eastern Railway (LNER).

In March 2016, Virgin Trains East Coast announced that its trains would carry the brand name Azuma, a Japanese word for "East". During June 2016, GWR announced that its trains would be known as Intercity Express Trains. However, due to the early demise of Virgin Trains East Coast, they would not operate the new trains, which entered service with successor London North Eastern Railway. Even so, the Azuma brand has been retained by LNER.

In July 2016, it was revealed that GWR's intended fleet of Class 801 units were to be converted from pure EMU to bi-mode due to delays in the electrification. Subsequently, these were reclassified as Class 800/3. As a part of this reconfiguration, the original 1.35 m^{3} (300 imp gal) fuel tanks were replaced with larger capacity 1.55 m^{3} (340 imp gal) tanks.

== Design ==
The Class 800 train is a high speed bi-modal multiple unit (BMU). The traction system comprises electric motors that are alternatively capable of drawing power from electrified overhead lines where available, or of using electricity produced by onboard underfloor diesel generators when travelling beyond the current electrified network. As per the train specification, the changeover between modes can occur at line speed for minimal service impact. As part of the Great Western Main Line order was originally for Class 801s, all Great Western franchise units have the possibility to be converted to electric-only operation by removal of the diesel engines.

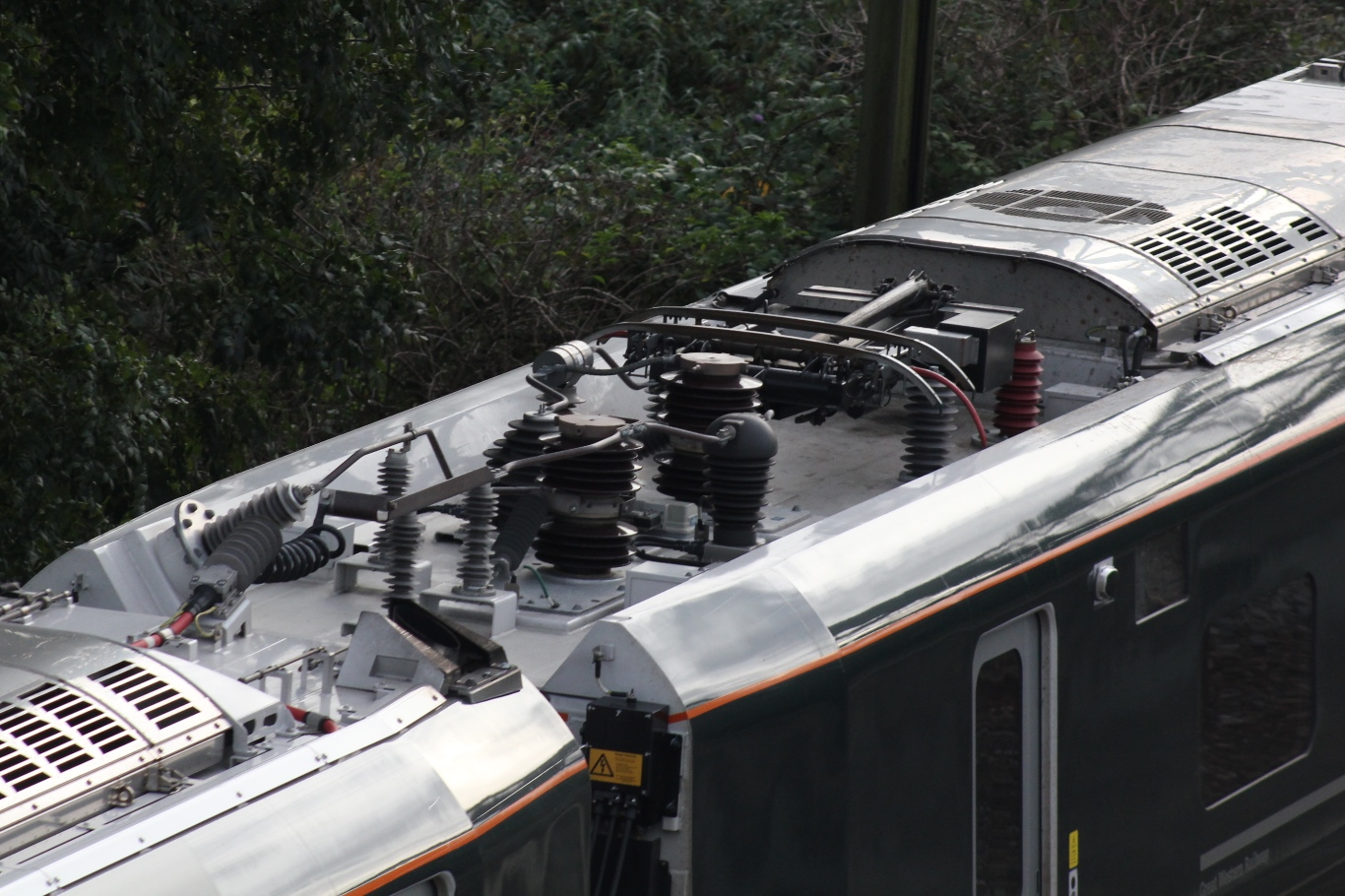
Class 800 pantograph in lowered position

Hitachi designed the rolling stock for conformance with the latest European standards as of 2014, including the Technical Specifications for Interoperability, and UK railway standards. A high level of flexibility was pursued in order to allow the type to be operated on numerous lines with different infrastructure, both in the present and the foreseeable future, such as variable passenger demand and the rollout of electrification. The front-end cars, which feature a collision safety structure compliant with the latest European standards, incorporate an automatic coupling system along with measures to reduce both air resistance and noise.

The driving cab of the Class 800 is provisioned with a variety of physical switches and monitors, the design of which is not only compliant with relevant standards at the time of design, but also shaped by feedback received from drivers as part of Human Factors engagement, in order to provide a usable and reliable cab design. The train crew are assisted by the Train Control and Management System (TCMS), which runs on an ethernet-based communication system. Amongst other functions, it provides onboard information systems such as the seat reservation system, public address, and passenger information system, as well interfacing with the cab displays, on-train data recorder, and 3G/4G communications.

It has been outfitted to work with various signalling systems, including the European Train Control System (ETCS) level 2, which satisfies safety integrity level 4 requirements. For compatibility with legacy signalling systems, it is also provisioned with apparatus for the Train Protection & Warning System (TPWS), Automatic Warning System (AWS), and Automatic Train Protection (ATP) system. Train information can be shared between ETCS, TCMS, and the GSM-R wireless communication system to simplify data entry. The train communicates in realtime with wayside systems, transmitting from the data recorder and receiving timetables and seat allocation data, amongst other material. Location tracking via GPS is used to automatically control selective door operation (where stations are shorter than the trains), guide drivers in efficiently operating the train to best suit the route, and provide information to passengers.

The Class 800 is capable of driver-only operation when required, although virtually all services have a guard on board. One exception is the Oxford and Bedwyn services operated by GWR, where drivers use the in-cab monitors to close the doors without a guard. When a guard is on board, door releases are still controlled by the driver, while the guard is responsible for closing the doors using the control panels in the vestibule areas; the driver will then carry out a secondary check of the side of the train before departure using the in-cab monitors.

=== Traction and generator units ===
Video of LNER 800209 passing Peterborough platform 3 at speed

Despite their underfloor positioning, the generator units (GU) feature a V12 engine. Incorporated as a single package, the GU includes the diesel engine, generator, radiator, and other subsystems, such as exhaust cleaning measures compliant with the Stage IIIB European Union exhaust emission standard. Elements external to the GU include the traction converter, fuel tank, automated fire protection system (using high pressure nitrogen gas), and braking. The auxiliary power system is powered directly from the direct current stage of the traction system. They are operated in parallel to provide greater redundancy. The power supply converter is designed to work with both sources of power, avoiding the need for a separate converter for each mode, thus reducing weight and complexity.

The GU is installed on vibration-isolating mountings, and fitted with side-mounted cowls to reduce external noise. Heat management measures include thermal insulation around key areas such as cable ducts. According to Modern Railways magazine, the limited space available for the GUs is responsible for them being prone to overheating. It claimed that, on one day in summer 2018, "half the diagrammed units were out of action as engines shut down through overheating".

The Class 800 and Class 802 bi-mode are equipped with three GUs per five-car set and five GUs per nine-car set; a five-car set has a GU situated under vehicles 2/3/4 and a nine-car set has a GU situated under vehicles 2/3/5/7/8. In comparison, the electric-orientated Class 801 features a single GU for a five- to nine-car set, which provides emergency power for limited traction and auxiliaries if the power supply from the overhead line fails. By adding or removing GUs, a Class 800 can be converted into a Class 801 and vice versa.

Active limiters are present that prevent the train from exceeding its peak service speed of 125 mph (200 km/h).

== Service history ==
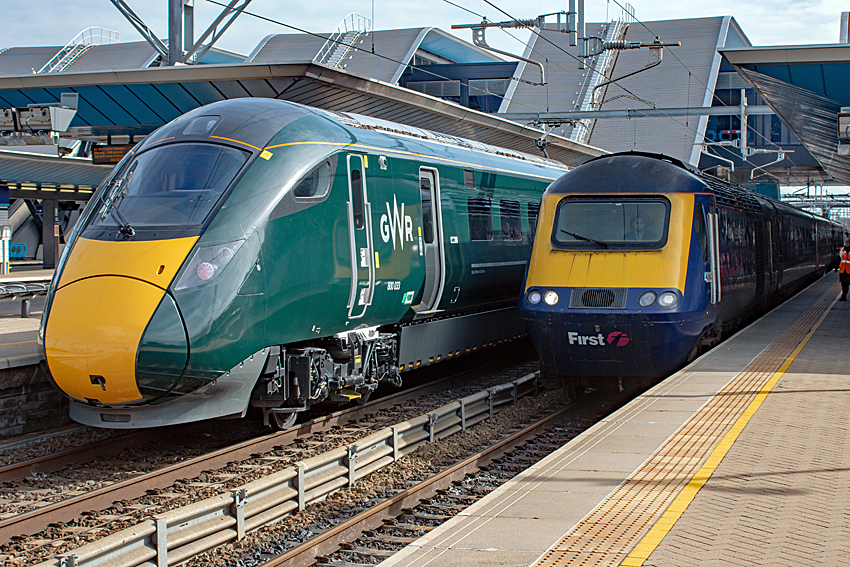
GWR Class 800 (left) next to its predecessor InterCity 125 (right) at Reading

The Class 800 trains came into service on the Great Western Main Line on 16 October 2017, under the brand name Intercity Express Train (abbreviated to IET). Teething problems surfaced on the inaugural service, the train not only ran late but one of the carriages suffered an air conditioning unit failure that discharged water into the passenger area. Following further issues, the units were withdrawn from service on 19 October for the rest of the day, re-entering service during the next day.

At one point, the type were due to enter service on the East Coast Main Line from December 2018. The launching operator on the East Coast became London North Eastern Railway (LNER) following Virgin Trains' decision to return the franchise to the government; the introduction was postponed by six months on account of the train's electro-magnetic emissions, which had reportedly caused problems with signals and other elements of lineside equipment.

On 30 June 2016, GWR's test unit (800004) ran from Reading to London Paddington carrying invited dignitaries.

On 14 June 2017, GWR unit 800003 was named Queen Elizabeth II by the monarch herself in a ceremony held at Paddington Station. The Queen had arrived at Paddington on the unit, travelling from Slough on the 175th anniversary of the first ever train journey by a reigning monarch, made on the same route by Queen Victoria. The name is carried in the form of a decal, rather than the more traditional cast metal plate; the name Queen Victoria is borne on the other end of the unit.

On 15 May 2019, the first Class 800 came into service on the East Coast Main Line under the brand name 'Azuma'. The type was initially worked on Leeds, Hull, and Newark services. On 1 August 2019, the first Class 800 performed the Edinburgh to King's Cross run on the Flying Scotsman service.

=== Accidents and incidents ===
On the evening of 13 November 2019, an LNER Azuma (800109) was involved in a collision with a Class 43 HST powercar (43300) at Neville Hill Depot, Leeds when the Class 800 ran into the rear of the HST. The trains were travelling at 15 miles per hour (24 km/h) and 5 miles per hour (8 km/h) respectively, with three carriages of the Class 800 derailing and the leading vehicle of the Class 800 and trailing locomotive of the HST being severely damaged. On 18 November 2020, the Rail Accident Investigation Branch published its report into the accident with the investigation finding that driver error was the cause of the accident, with insufficient training of the driver being an underlying cause. The effect of the collision was exacerbated by the design of the Class 800 as crashworthiness requirements did not require the effects of a collision at less than 23.5 mph (37.8 km/h) to be taken into account, nor did it include specific criteria for assessing the derailment performance.

=== Cracks ===
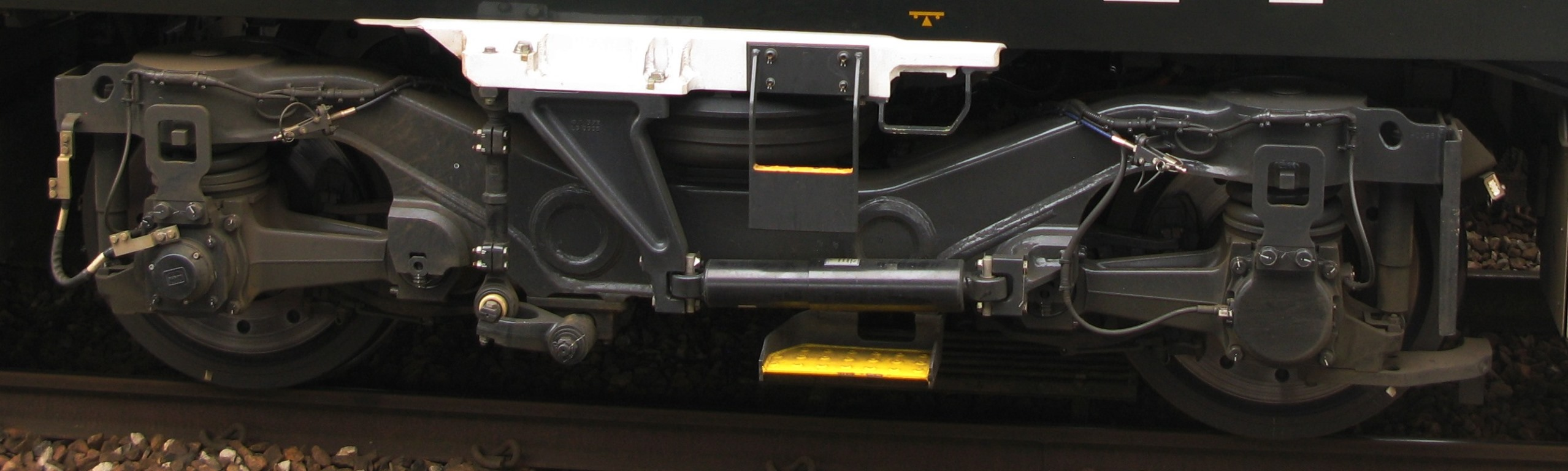
A Class 800 bogie. The white part at the top is MIG welded to the body and has the triangular yaw damper bracket on the left and lifting pad at the top of the square fixture to the right.

On 26 April 2021 GWR temporarily withdrew eight 5-car Class 800 sets from service after finding cracks in the yaw damper brackets.

On 8 May 2021, Great Western Railway, London North Eastern Railway and Hull Trains suspended most of their Class 800 series trains after cracks were found on the welds of the lifting pads on an IET trainset undergoing maintenance. This incident is potentially linked to the issues identified on a GWR trainset undergoing maintenance on 26 April. Significant disruption was caused by cancellations of trains between London, to Scotland and to the west of the UK. Reports suggested that delays would last for "some time" with the repairs not being easy. From 13 May 2021, some trains started to return to service, however more severely affected trains require repairs before use and a long term fix for all units is required.

On 7 April 2022, the Office of Rail and Road (ORR), which regulates the safety and economics of Great Britain's railways, published a safety report on the fatigue cracks in the aluminium vehicle body shells above the bogies close to the yaw damper bracket and anti-roll bar fixing points. The trains had experienced greater loads from train movement than specified, probably caused by a combination of wheel wear and track design. Further cracks in or near the welds of the lifting plates to the vehicle body were the result of stress corrosion cracking (SCC) in a high-strength 7000 series aluminium alloy caused by a combination of residual stresses from being MIG welded to the body and exposure to air containing sea salt on railway lines near the coast. To mitigate the risk of cracking, 1,247 Class 800 series vehicles need to be repaired by replacing the affected parts including the longitudinal welds and by installing additional bolts, to retain the plate, if the weld should fail completely as a result of stress corrosion cracking.

== Fleet details ==
Subclass	Brand name	Operator	Quantity	Year built	Cars per unit	Unit nos.	Ref
800/0	Intercity Express Train	Great Western Railway	36	2014–2018	5	800001–800036	
800/1	Azuma	London North Eastern Railway	1	2015	9	800101	
800/1	Azuma	London North Eastern Railway	12	2018	9	800102–800113	
800/2	Azuma	London North Eastern Railway	10	2018	5	800201–800210	
800/3	Intercity Express Train	Great Western Railway	21	2017–2018	9	800301–800321	

=== Illustrations ===
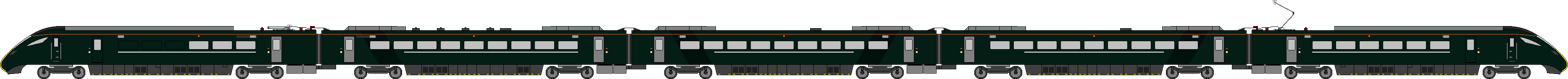
Illustration of a GWR Class 800/0 Intercity Express Train (IET)
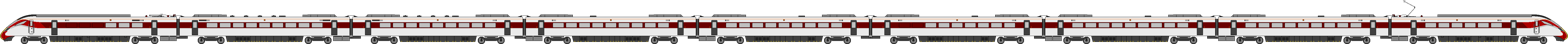
Illustration of a LNER Class 800/1 Azuma

=== Named units ===
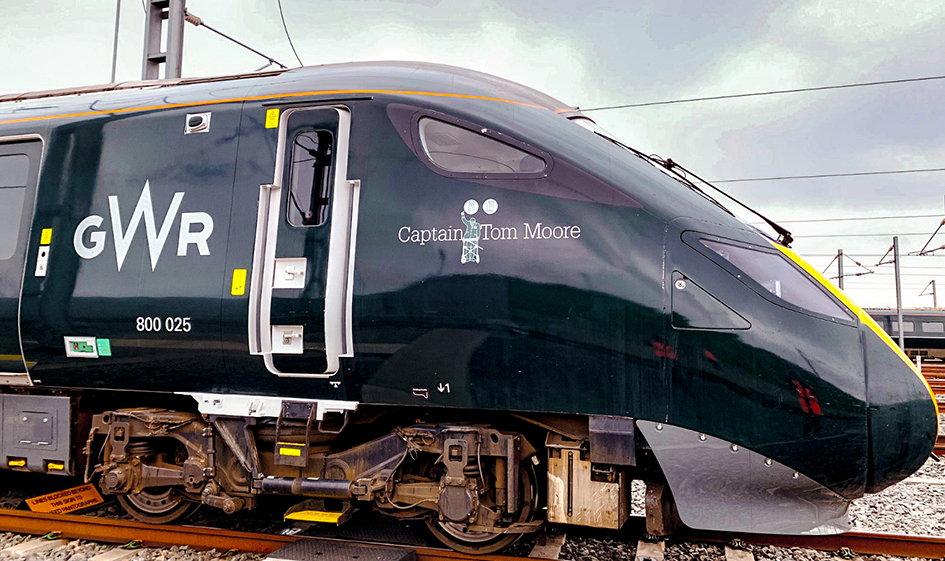
"Captain Tom Moore" name applied to unit 800025

Great Western Railway's Class 800 and 802 units are being named after "inspirational people" who have influenced the regions that the company serves. Many units have one name for each end, which are shown below as separate rows for the same unit number.

On 10 January 2018, unit 800010 was named Michael Bond in a ceremony at Paddington by his daughter, Karen Jankel. This coincided with the 60th anniversary of the late author's famous Paddington Bear series of children's books, and the other end of the unit carries the bear's name.

On 1 May 2021, unit 800025 Captain Sir Tom Moore arrived back at London Paddington, after completing a challenge to stop at 100 stations in only 40 hours, raising money for charity in memory of Captain Tom. The train was greeted by applause.

London North Eastern Railway unveiled a special vinyl on one of their units to celebrate the launch of Azuma to Scotland. It was operated on the first Azuma from Scotland, which ran on the 'Flying Scotsman' from Edinburgh on 1 August 2019. This same unit was also used when Azuma was launched to Aberdeen and Inverness respectively.

Great Western Railway
Unit number	Date	Photo	Name	Notes	Ref.
800003	13 June 2017		Queen Elizabeth II	An extra sticker (pictured) was added during 2022 to commemorate the Platinum Jubilee of Elizabeth II.	
800003	13 June 2017		Queen Victoria	An extra sticker (pictured) was added during 2022 to commemorate the Platinum Jubilee of Elizabeth II.	
800004	30 June 2016		Isambard Kingdom Brunel		
800004	30 June 2016		Sir Daniel Gooch		
800005	4 July 2023		Aneurin Bevan NHS 1948–2023		
800008	7 June 2018		Alan Turing	Carries a special pride livery	
800009	7 March 2018		Sir Gareth Edwards		
800009	7 March 2018		John Charles		
800010	10 January 2018		Michael Bond		
800010	10 January 2018		Paddington Bear		
800012	31 July 2026		The Greatest Gathering		
800014	8 March 2019		Megan Lloyd George		
800014	8 March 2019		Edith New		
800016	25 November 2022			Carries a special White Ribbon livery; the train is a dark blue rather than dark green colour	
800019	22 June 2018		Johnny Johnson and Joy Lofthouse	Unlike other shared units, both nameplates are together at one end	
800020	18 April 2018		Bob Woodward		
800020	18 April 2018		Elizabeth Ralph		
800021	21 February 2025		Gill Clay		
800022	24 June 2021		Tulbahadur Pun		
800023	18 April 2019		Kathryn Osmond	Both named after deceased emergency service workers	
800023	18 April 2019		Firefighter Fleur Lombard	Both named after deceased emergency service workers	
800024	2 May 2024		HRH The Princess Royal		
800025	29 April 2020		Captain Tom Moore		
800026	6 August 2018		Don Cameron		
800028	30 November 2023		Sir Peter Parker		
800028	30 November 2023		Oliver Lovell		
800029	17 February 2022		Christopher Dando		
800029	17 February 2022		Evette Wakely		
800030	5 July 2021		Lincoln Callaghan		
800030	5 July 2021		Henry Cleary		
800031	25 August 2021		Mazen Salmou		
800031	25 August 2021		Charlotte Marsland		
800032	28 February 2022		Iain Bugler		
800032	28 February 2022		Sarah Williams-Martin		
800033	4 March 2022		Emma Hurrell		
800033	4 March 2022		Martin Heath		
800034	13 July 2022		Jo Prosser		
800034	13 July 2022		Tracy Devlin		
800035	7 March 2022		Liz Gallagher		
800035	7 March 2022		Naomi Betts		
800036	30 October 2020		Dr Paul Stephenson		
800306	9 November 2018		Harold Day DSC	The unit carries a special livery with poppies on the side and a list of all 2,545 Great Western Railway staff who died in war.	
800306	9 November 2018		Allan Leonard Lewis VC	The unit carries a special livery with poppies on the side and a list of all 2,545 Great Western Railway staff who died in war.	
800310	7 May 2021		Wing Commander Ken Rees	Escapee from Stalag Luft III	
800314	6 March 2020		Odette Hallowes GC MBE LdH		
800316	6 March 2020		Roar of the Roses	The emblem on the side of the train (pictured) originally read "It's coming home" after England won the UEFA Women's Euro 2022, then the word "again" was added after England won again in 2025.	
800317	28 September 2021		Freya Bevan		
800321	15 June 2020			A face mask was painted onto both ends to remind passengers to wear a face covering during the COVID-19 pandemic	

LNER
Unit number	Date	Photo	Name	Notes	Ref.
800104	1 August 2019			Carries a special tartan-style livery and the "Celebrating Scotland" brand	
800106	6 October 2023		You Belong	Part of an ongoing collaboration with the Campaign Against Living Miserably, a UK charity	

== Interior ==
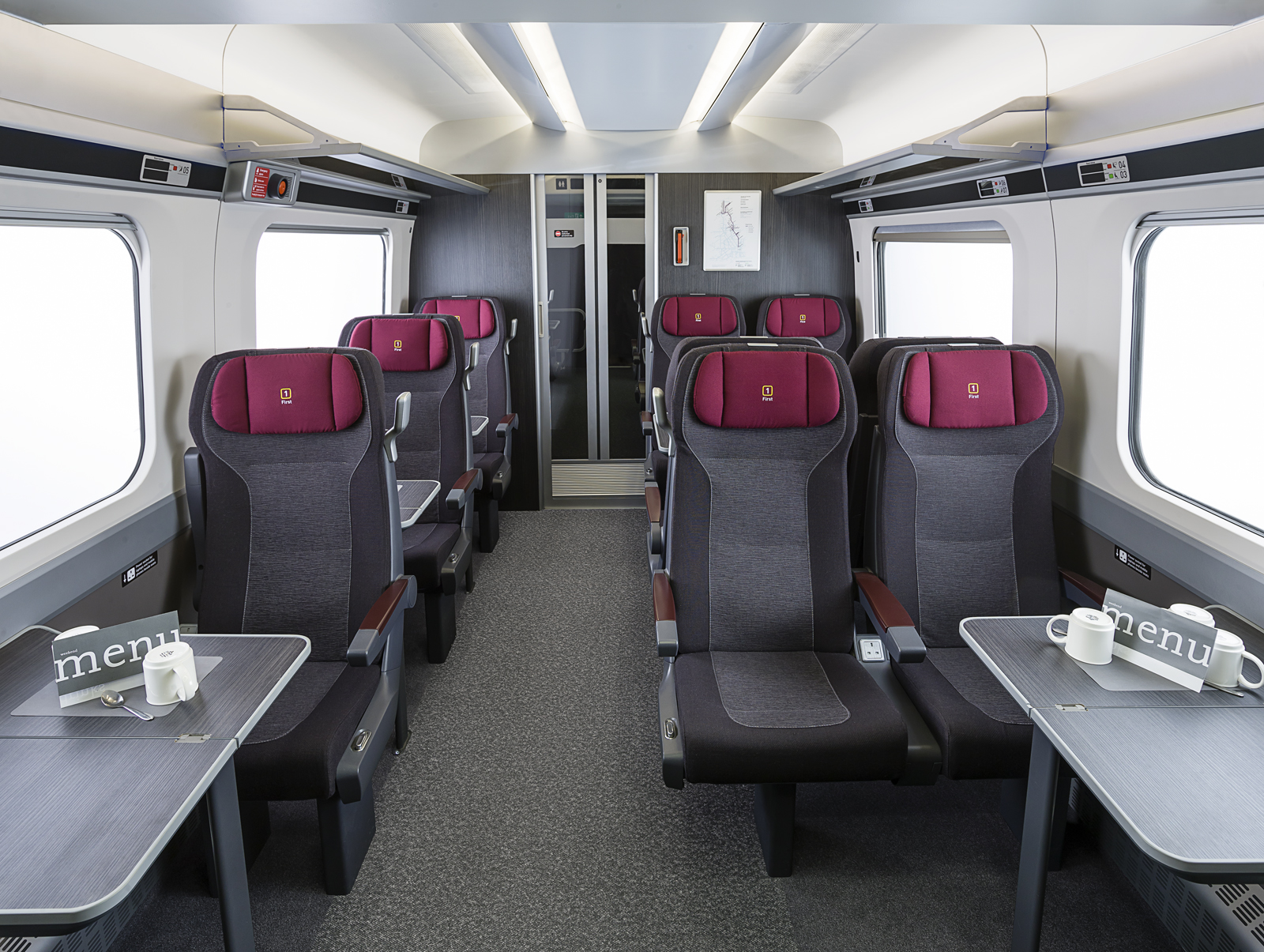
First class interior mock-up in 2014

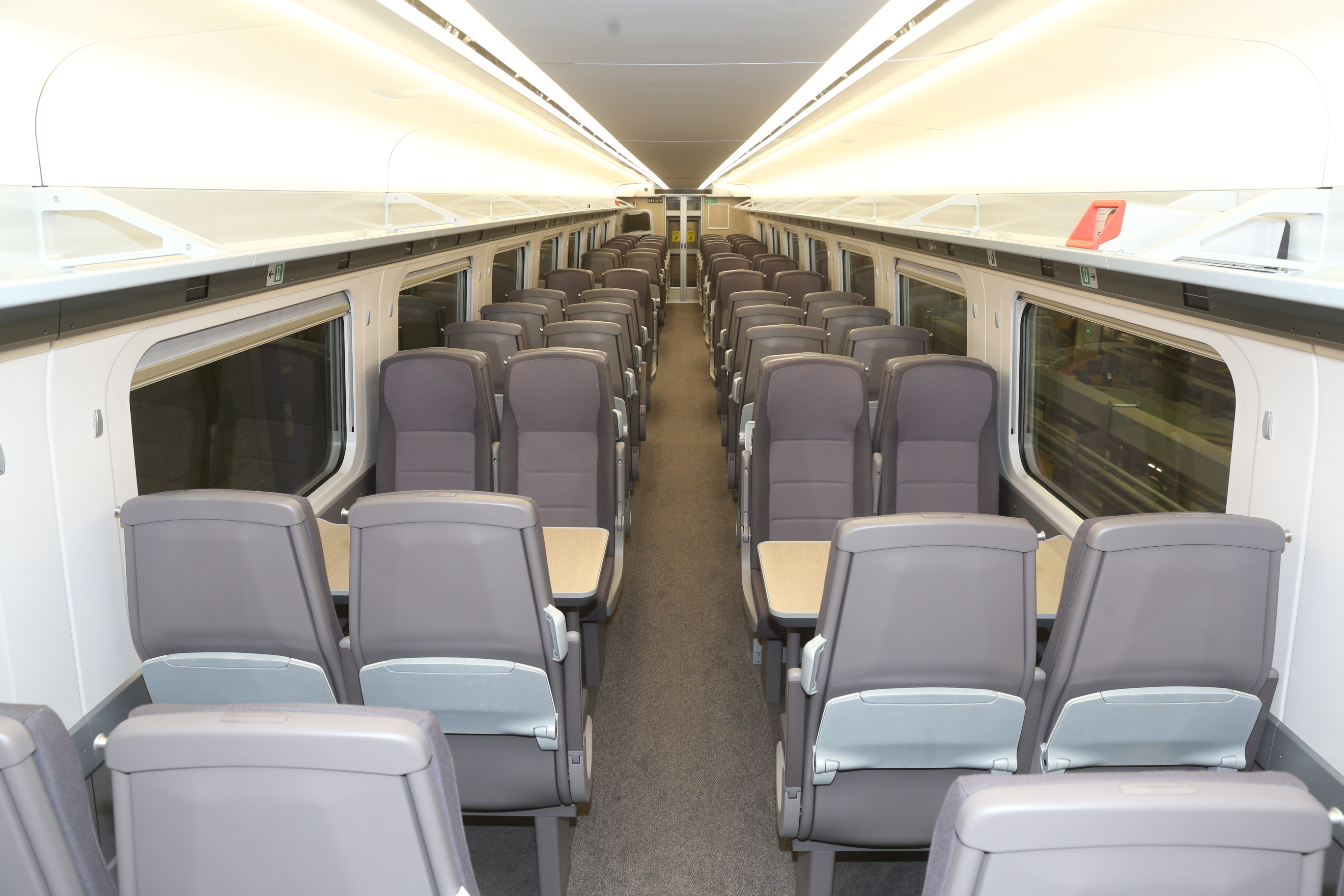
Standard Class interior in unit 800002 before receiving GWR colours

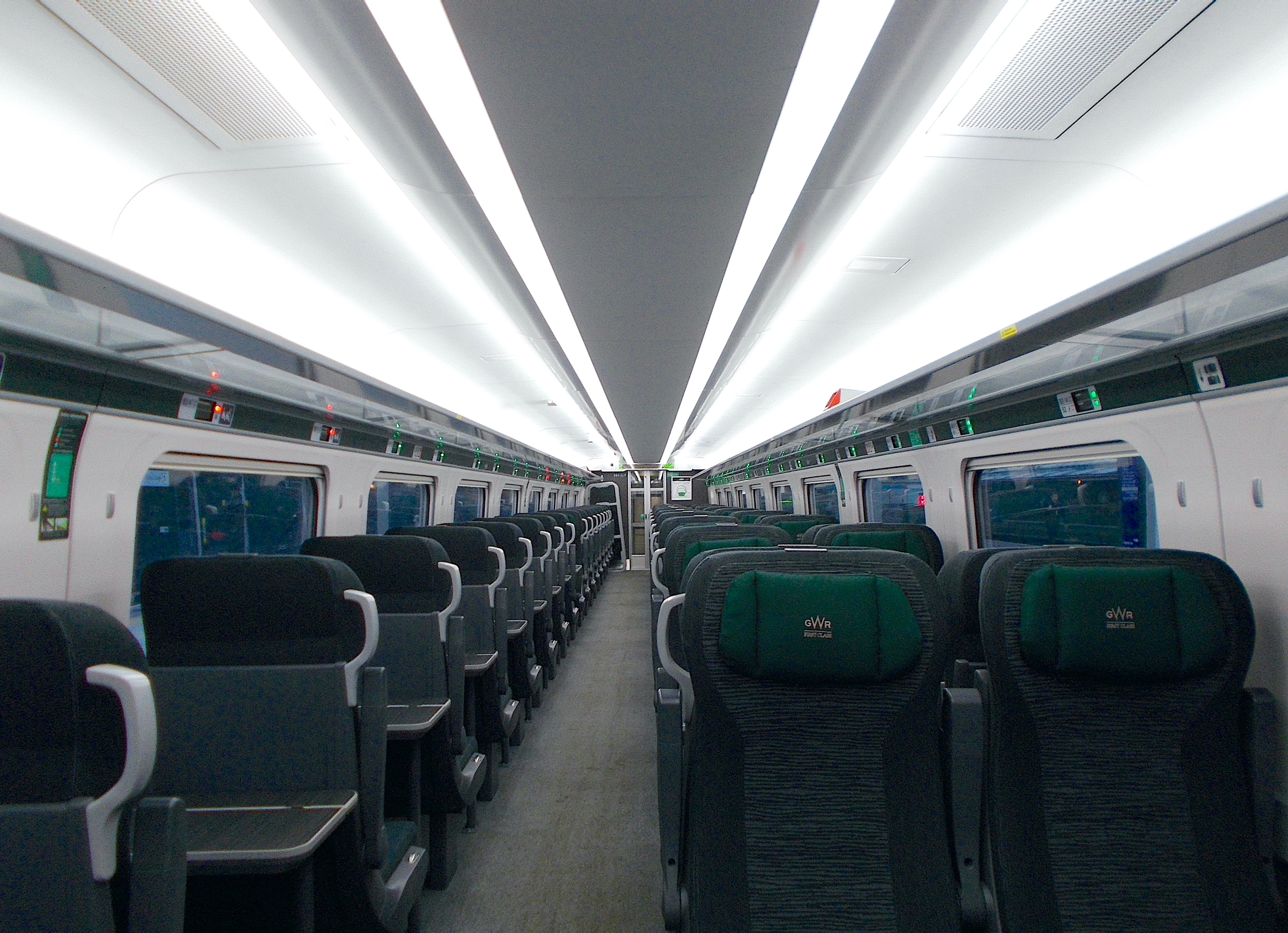
The interior of first class aboard a GWR Class 800

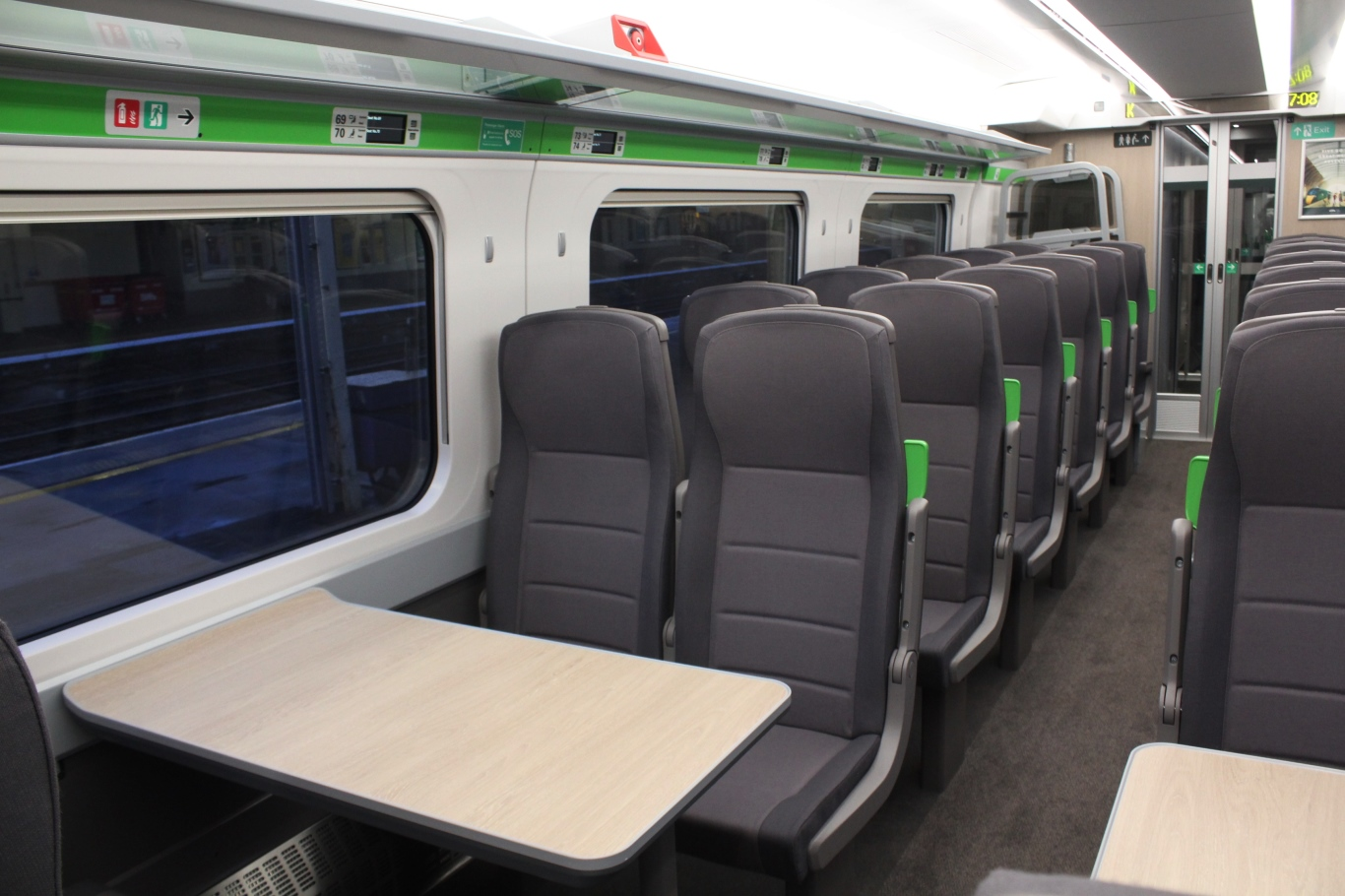
GWR Standard class interior. This was the original seat cover which has since been changed on majority of the units.

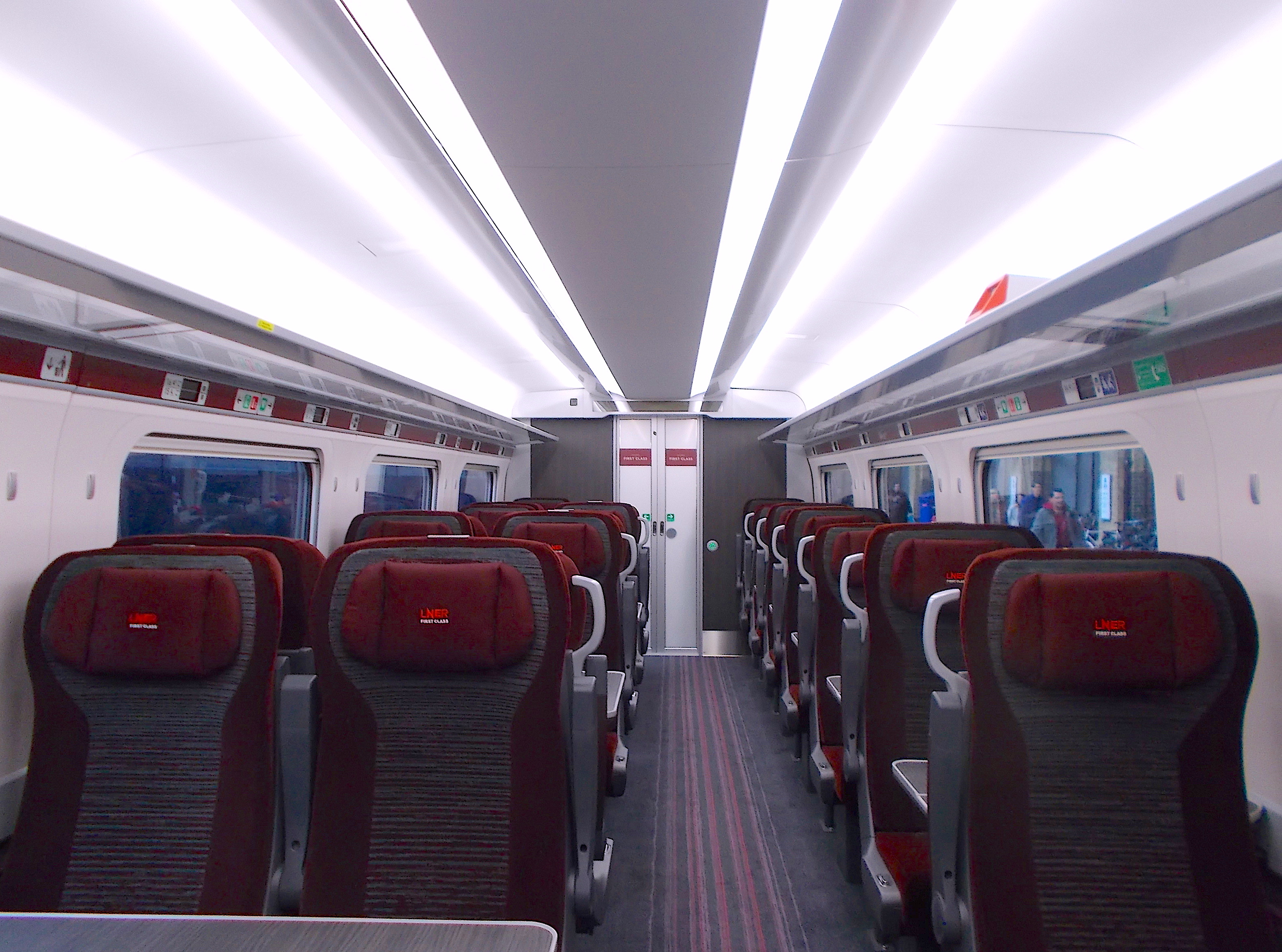
The interior of first class aboard a LNER Class 800

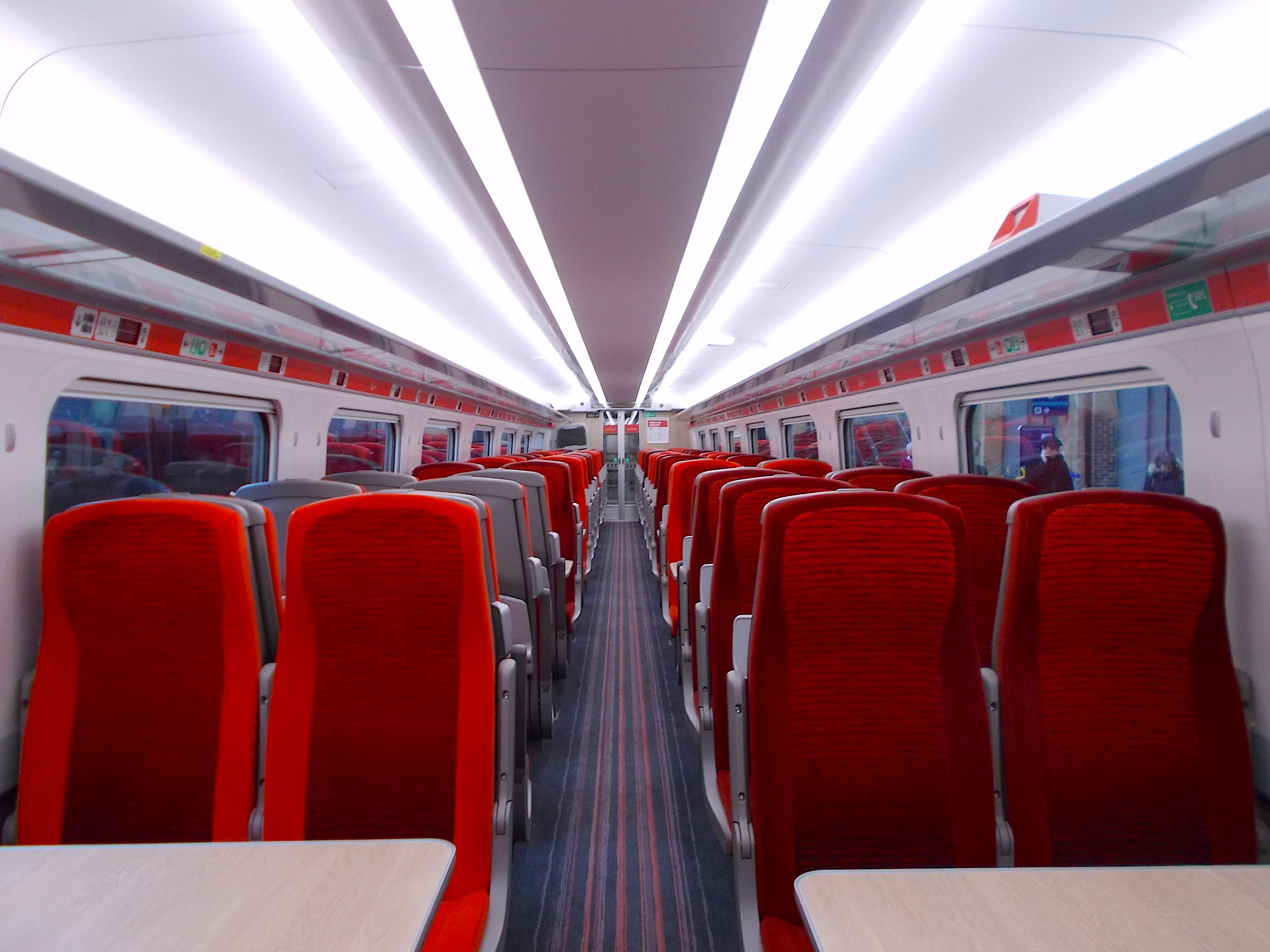
The interior of standard class aboard a LNER Class 800

The passenger compartments on the Class 800 trains are typically divided into first class and standard class sections. The vestibule area accommodates the exterior doors along with space for storage areas for passenger luggage (including bicycles), and a sizable universal accessibility toilet. It can be configured to include catering facilities, including a kitchen and preparation room. The interior was designed to fulfil the requirements of the Persons with Reduced Mobility-TSI standard, as well as to satisfy the varying requirements and preferences of multiple operators, and to facilitate future refurbishments and reconfigurations. The basic layout has been standardised.

The interiors have reportedly been praised for their increased leg-room and greater number of seats and tables in standard class, in comparison to the trains they replace. However, the first class seats are no longer leather as was the case on InterCity 125s; this is due to fire regulations. The GWR Intercity Express Train has also been criticised for the lack of a buffet car with the catering service instead being provided by a trolley and also because surfboards are no longer allowed on the train due to the limited space available. In comparison with the IET, the LNER Azuma has a small 'micro' buffet retained with other aspects of the interior being similar between the two companies.

== Models ==
In 2017, Hornby issued its first OO gauge five-car model of the BR Class 800/0 Hitachi IEP Bi-Mode in GWR Green livery.

In early May 2021, Kato released its N-scale five-car model of the BR Class 800/0 Hitachi IEP Bi-Mode in GWR Green livery with the five-car model of the BR Class 800/2 in LNER livery later that month.
