= 255 series =

Japanese train type

255 series Bōsō View Express
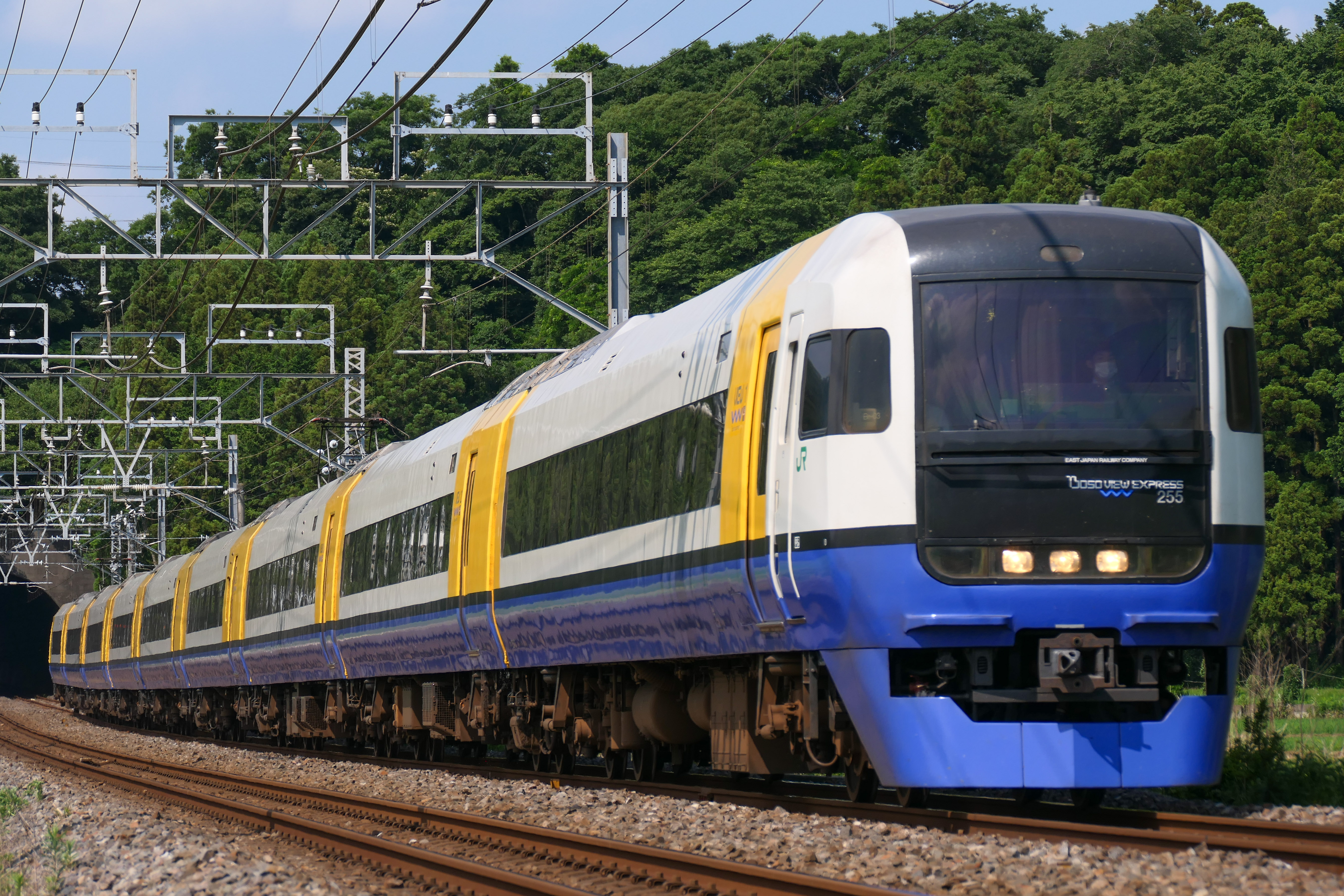
- A 255 series EMU on a Shiosai service in June 2021
- In service: 2 July 1993 – 2024 (regular service)
- Manufacturers: Kinki Sharyo, Tokyu Car
- Family name: Bōsō View Express
- Replaced: 183 series
- Constructed: 1993–1994
- Entered service: 2 July 1993
- Number built: 45 vehicles (5 sets)
- Number in service: 9 vehicles (1 sets)
- Number retired: 36 vehicles (4 sets)
- Successor: E259 series (Shiosai)
- Formation: 9 cars per trainset
- Fleet numbers: Be01 – Be05
- Operator: JR East
- Depot: Makuhari
- Lines served: Keiyo Line; Sōbu Main Line; Sotobō Line; Uchibō Line; Yokosuka Line

Specifications
- Car body construction: Steel
- Car length: 21,000 mm (68 ft 11 in) (end cars); 20,500 mm (67 ft 3 in) (intermediate cars)
- Width: 2,946 mm (9 ft 8.0 in)
- Height: 3,785 mm (12 ft 5.0 in)
- Doors: 1 sliding door per side
- Maximum speed: 130 km/h (80 mph)
- Traction system: Variable frequency (IGBT)
- Power output: 95 kW x 16 = 1,520 kW
- Electric system: 1,500 V DC overhead
- Bogies: DT56E (motored), TR241E (trailer)
- Safety systems: ATS-P, ATS-SN
- Track gauge: 1,067 mm (3 ft 6 in)

The 255 series (Japanese: 255系), branded Bōsō View Express (房総ビューエクスプレス), is a DC electric multiple unit (EMU) train type operated by East Japan Railway Company (JR East) in Japan. It was introduced into commercial service on 2 July 1993, and was specifically designed to be used on limited express services from Tokyo to the Bōsō Peninsula.

After being withdrawn from regular service in June 2024, the type has only been used on special services.

== Design ==
The trains were built jointly by Kinki Sharyo and Tokyu Car, with a steel body design based directly on the earlier 253 series EMUs built for Narita Express services, although the window height was increased by 100 mm. It is the first JR East limited express rolling stock to feature VVVF Gate turn-off thyristor traction control systems, based on the results of trials with the prototype 209 series commuter EMUs.

DT56E bogies are used on motored cars, and TR241E bogies are used on trailer cars.

== Operations ==
=== Sōbu Main Line ===
- Shiosai: Tokyo – Chōshi (since 10 December 2005)

=== Sotobō Line ===
- Wakashio: Awa-Kamogawa – Tokyo
- Shinjuku Wakashio: Shinjuku – Awa-Kamogawa

== Formations ==
The five 9-car sets, numbered Be01 to Be05, are formed as shown below, with car 1 at the Tokyo end. Trains consist of four motored "MoHa" and five "KuHa", "SaHa", and "SaRo" trailer cars.

Car No.	1	2	3	4	5	6	7	8	9
Designation	Tc'	M2	M1	Ts	T2	T1	M2	M1	Tc
Numbering	KuHa 254	MoHa 254	MoHa 255	SaRo 255	SaHa 254	SaHa 255	MoHa 254	MoHa 255	KuHa 255
Weight (t)	31.1	35.7	33.6	29.2	28.1	27.3	35.7	33.6	31.7
Seating capacity	64	64	68	42	58	64	64	68	52

Cars 2 and 8 are each equipped with one PS26A scissors-type pantograph.

=== Passenger facilities ===
- Green (first class) car: Car 4
- Toilets: Cars 2, 4, 5, 7, 9
- Wheelchair space: Car 5
- Telephone: Car 4

== Interior ==
Seating is arranged 2+2 abreast in both standard class and Green class, with a seat pitch of 970 mm (38 in) in standard class, and a seat pitch of 1,160 mm (46 in) in Green class.

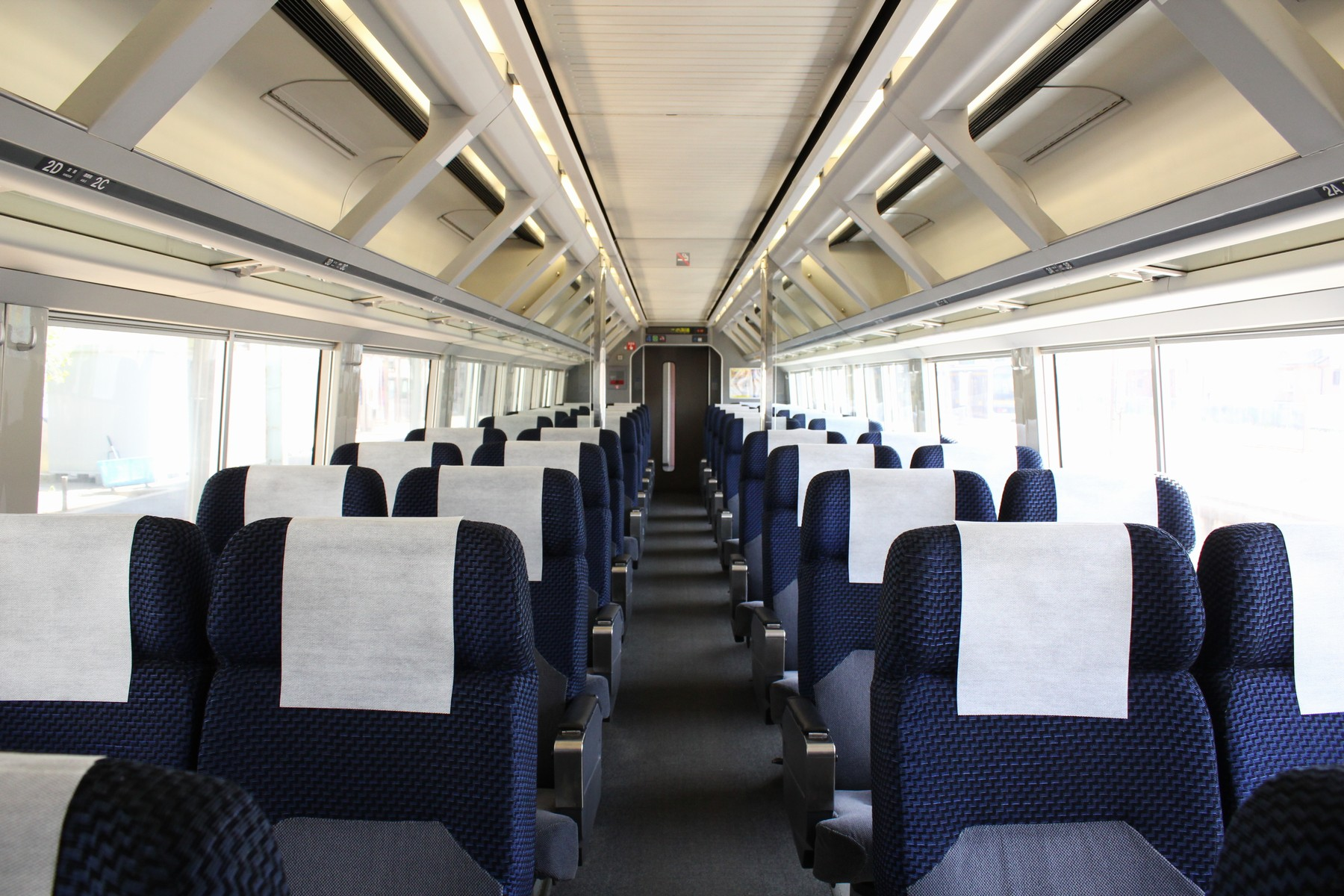
Green car (SaRo 255-1) interior view

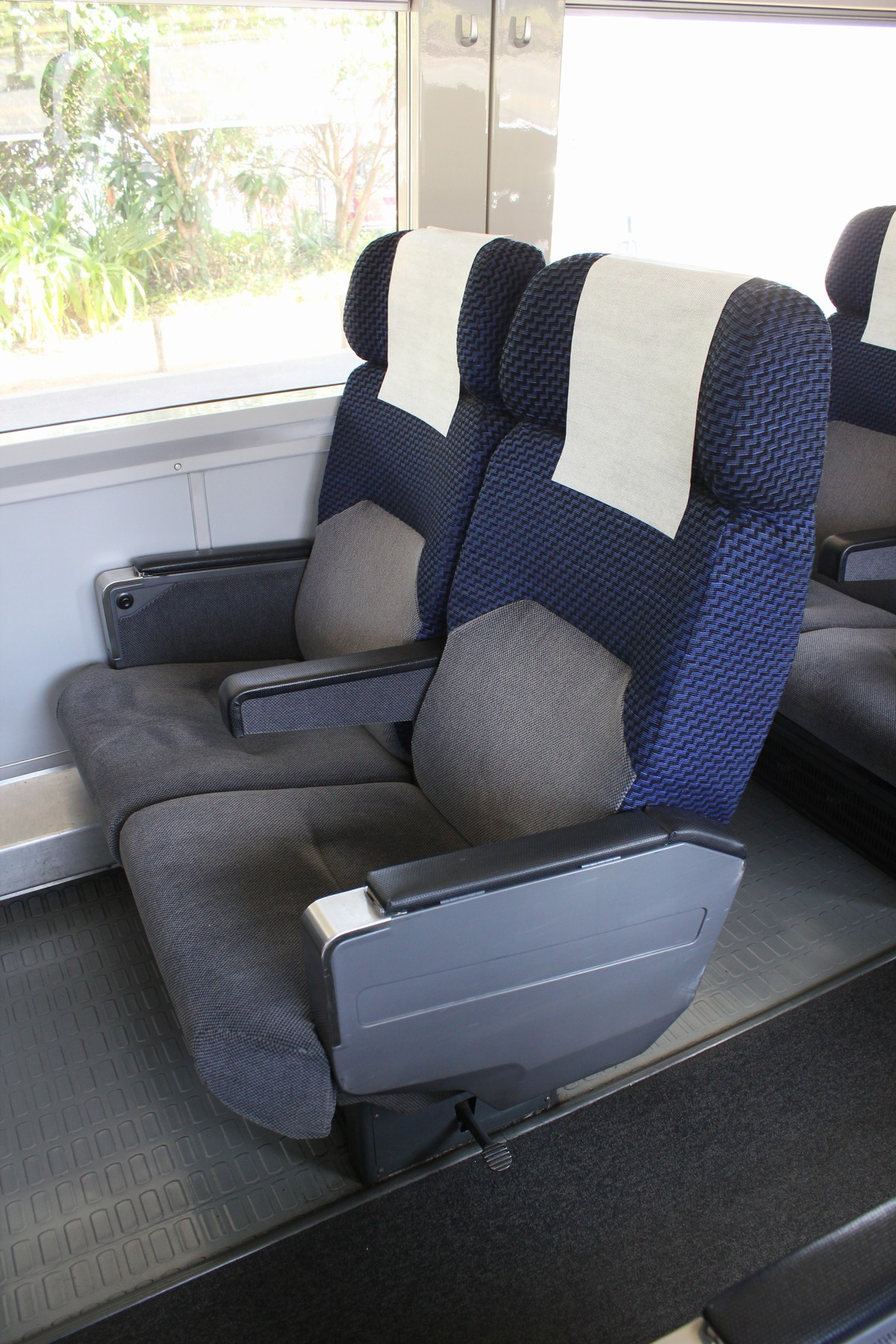
Green class seating

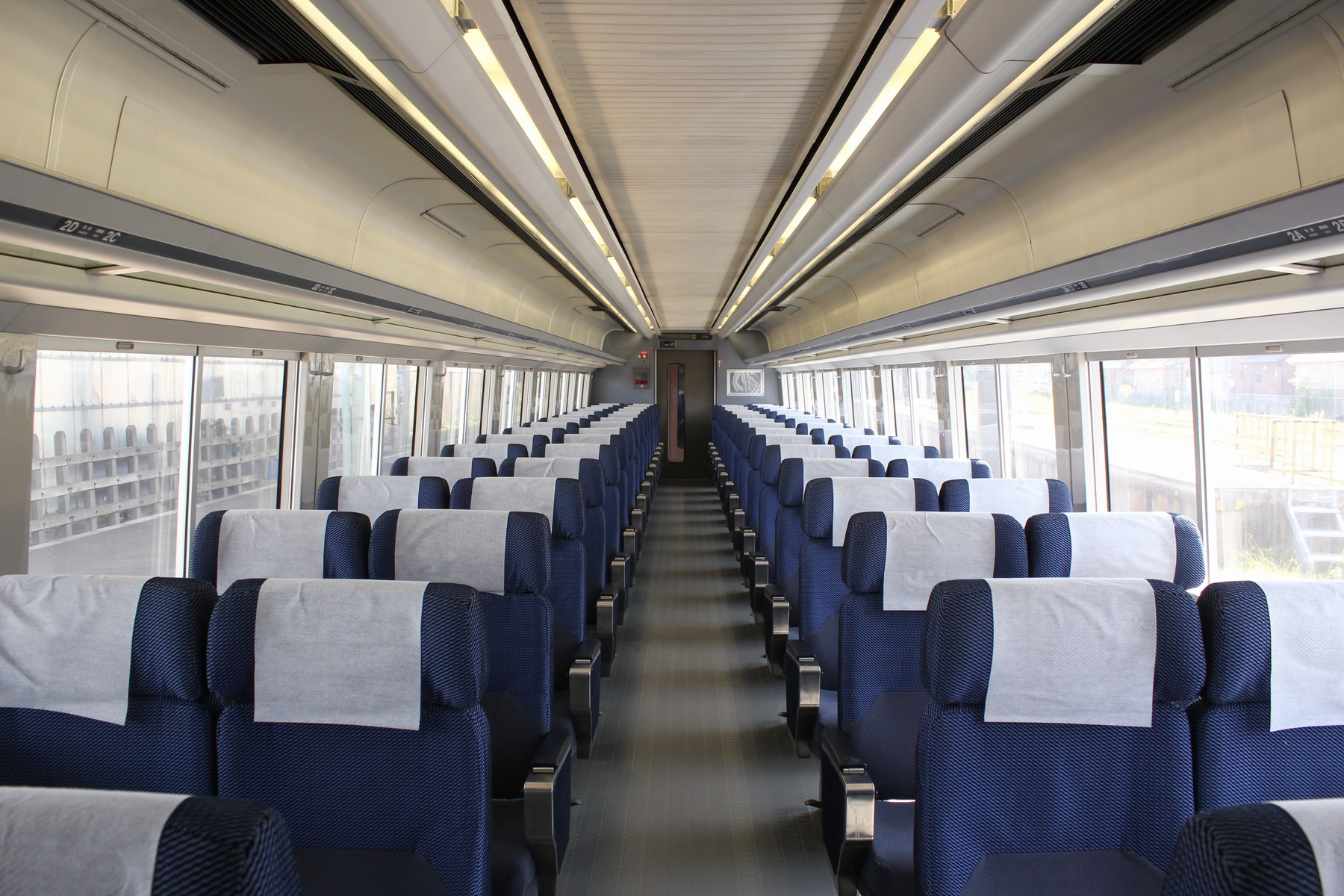
Standard class car (MoHa 254-2) interior view

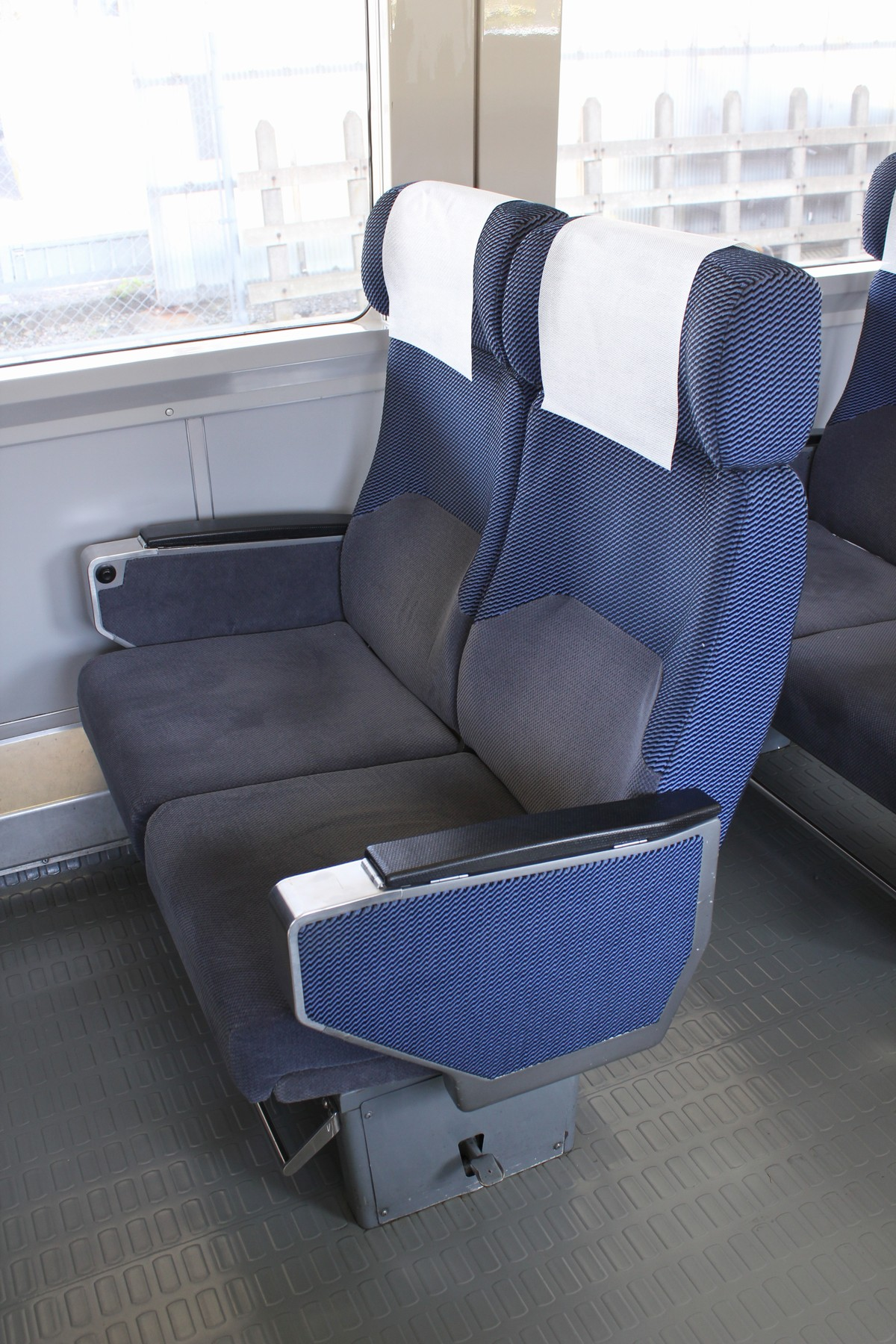
Standard class seating

== History ==
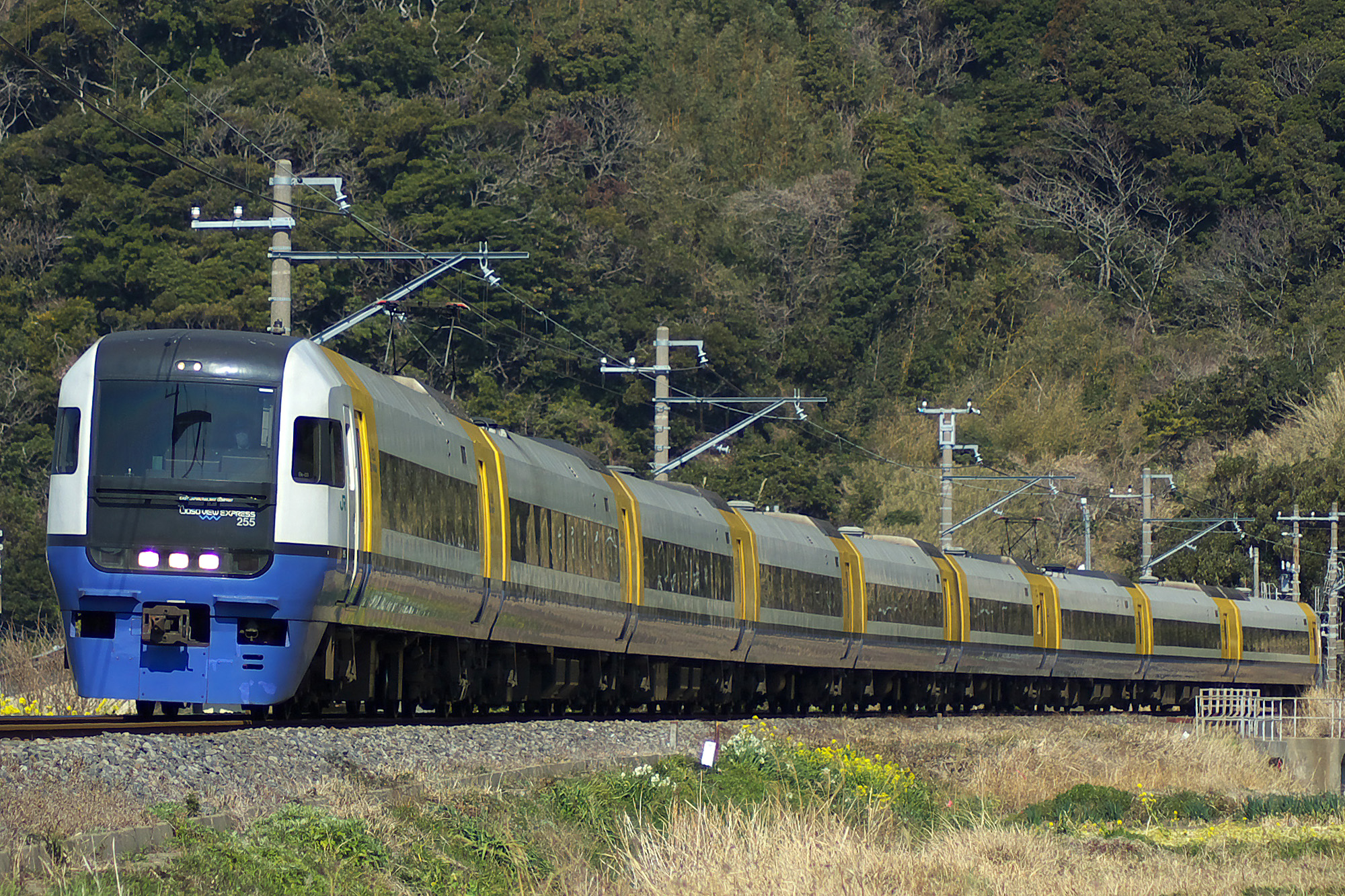
A 255 series set on a Sazanami service in March 2008, with original front-end skirt design

The first two sets, Be01 and Be02, were delivered in March and April 1993, entering revenue service from 2 July 1993 on View Wakashio and View Sazanami limited express services. Three more sets, Be03 to Be05, were delivered in October and November 1994.

From the start of the revised timetable on 12 December 2000, the Green car (car 4) was made entirely no smoking.

The destination indicators on the sides of cars were changed from the original roller blind type to LED indicators between October and November 2005.

From the start of the revised timetable on 10 December 2005, View Wakashio and View Sazanami services were renamed simply Wakashio and Sazanami, and 255 series sets were also introduced on Shiosai services. All cars were made no-smoking from this date.

The front-end skirt design was modified during 2010.

From 2014, the 255 series sets were retrofitted with IGBT-based traction control systems.

=== Withdrawal ===
Initially, the 255 series sets were slated to be withdrawn from Wakashio, Sazanami, and Shiosai services before the start of the revised timetable on 16 March 2024. However, their withdrawal from regular service was deferred until June 2024 with the last regularly scheduled Sazanami and Wakashio services using this series taking place on 28 and 29 June respectively. They have since remained in limited operation for special services. Set Be05 was withdrawn from service in June 2024, followed by set Be01 in July 2024.

== See also ==
- E257 series, also used on Bōsō limited express services
