= E259 series =

Japanese train type

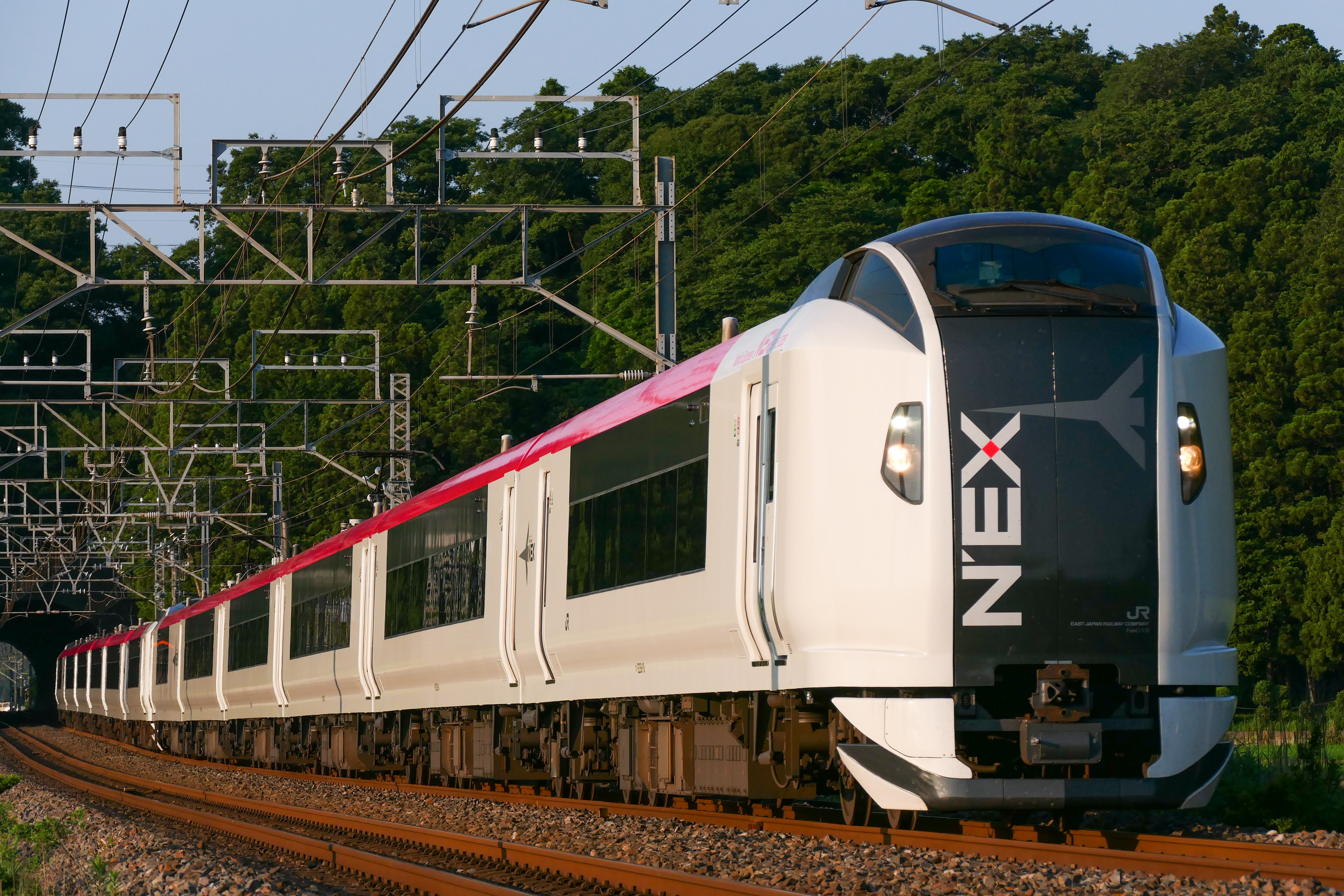
- A pair of E259 series sets on a Narita Express service in June 2021
- In service: October 2009 – present
- Manufacturers: Kinki Sharyo, Tokyu Car Corporation
- Family name: N'EX
- Replaced: 253 series (Narita Express), 255 series (Shiosai)
- Constructed: 2009–2010
- Number built: 132 vehicles (22 sets)
- Number in service: 132 vehicles (22 sets)
- Formation: 6 cars per trainset
- Fleet numbers: Ne001–Ne022
- Capacity: 290 (262 standard + 28 Green)
- Operator: JR East
- Depot: Kamakura

Specifications
- Car body construction: Aluminium alloy
- Car length: 21 m (68 ft 11 in) (end cars); 20 m (65 ft 7 in) (intermediate cars)
- Width: 2,946 mm (9 ft 8.0 in)
- Height: 3,655 mm (11 ft 11.9 in)
- Doors: 2 per side
- Maximum speed: 130 km/h (81 mph)
- Traction system: Hitachi SC90A 2-level IGBT–VVVF
- Traction motors: 4 × 140 kW (190 hp) MT75B 3-phase AC induction motor
- Acceleration: 0.56 m/s^{2} (1.3 mph/s)
- Deceleration: 1.4 m/s^{2} (3.1 mph/s)
- Electric systems: 1,500 V DC overhead lines
- Current collection: PS33D single-arm pantographs
- UIC classification: 2′2′+Bo′Bo′+Bo′Bo′+Bo′Bo′+Bo′Bo′+2′2′
- Bogies: DT77 (motored), TR262 (trailer)
- Safety systems: ATS-P, ATS-SN
- Track gauge: 1,067 mm (3 ft 6 in)

Notes/references
- This train won the 53rd Blue Ribbon Award in 2010.

The E259 series (E259系) is a DC electric multiple unit (EMU) train type operated by East Japan Railway Company (JR East) in Japan since October 2009 on Narita Express limited express services to and from Narita International Airport.

== Design ==
The design of the trains was overseen by industrial designer Kenji Ekuan. Retracting gangway connections on the end cars allow two sets to be coupled together to form 12-car formations. Electrical and safety equipment is duplicated, as on the E233 series commuter trains, to improve safety and reliability. Active suspension on end cars and yaw dampers between all cars provide improved ride comfort. The MoHa E259-500 car is equipped with two single-arm pantographs, but one is reserved for emergency use.

Unlike the previous 253 series trains, the E259 series trains are not equipped with Automatic Train Control (ATC).

== Operations ==
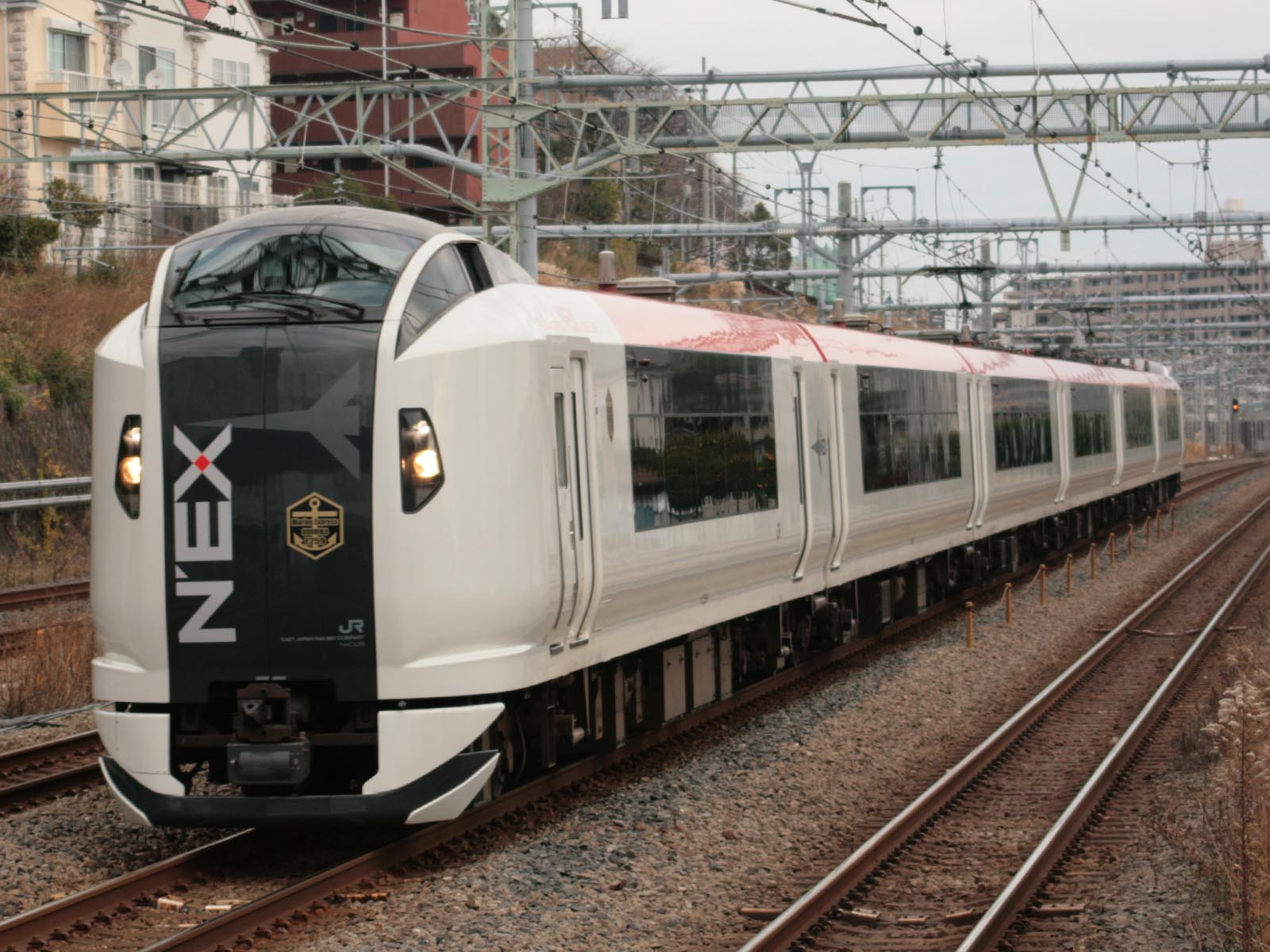
An E259 series set on a Marine Express Odoriko service in December 2012

The E259 series trains are used almost exclusively on Narita Express limited express services linking Narita International Airport in Chiba Prefecture with Tokyo and other stations in the Greater Tokyo area. E259 series trains were also used occasionally on seasonal Marine Express Odoriko services between Tokyo and Izukyū-Shimoda. One set, Ne002, was assigned to these services, and carried a logo sticker on the front and sides.

== Formation ==
The fleet consists of 22 six-car sets, consisting of four motored (M) cars and two trailer (T) cars, as shown below, with car 1 at the Tokyo end.

| Car No. | 1/7 | 2/8 | 3/9 | 4/10 | 5/11 | 6/12 |
|---|---|---|---|---|---|---|
| Designation | Tc' | M' | M | M' | M | Tsc |
| Numbering | KuHa E258 | MoHa E258 | MoHa E259 | MoHa E258-500 | MoHa E259-500 | KuRo E259 |
| Weight (t) | 38.4 | 38.0 | 36.5 | 38.0 | 37.0 | 38.9 |
| Seating capacity | 40 | 56 | 56 | 56 | 54 | 28 |

The "Tsc" cars are green (first class) cars. Cars 3 and 5 are equipped with PS33D single-arm pantographs (two on car 5, one on car 3).

== Bogies ==
The DT77 (motored) and TR262 (trailer) bolsterless bogies are developed from the DT71 and TR255 bogies used on the E233 series EMUs. The end bogies of the Tc driving cars are designated TR262, and the inner bogies of the Tc driving cars are designated TR262A. All the bogies use tread brakes, and the trailer bogies additionally use disc brakes. Wheel diameter is 860 mm (33.9 in), and the distance between wheel centers is 2,100 mm (6 ft 11 in).

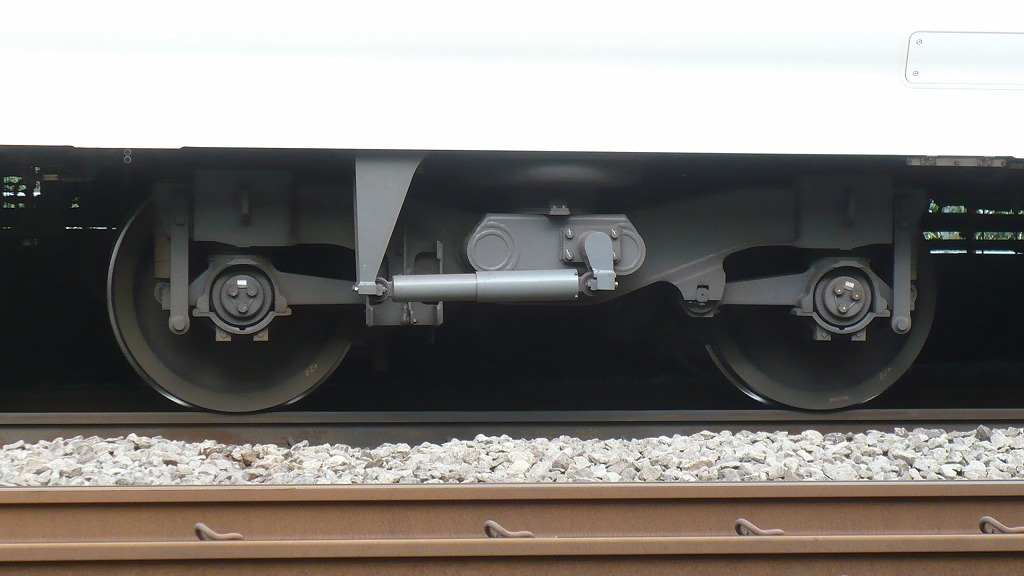
DT77 motor bogie

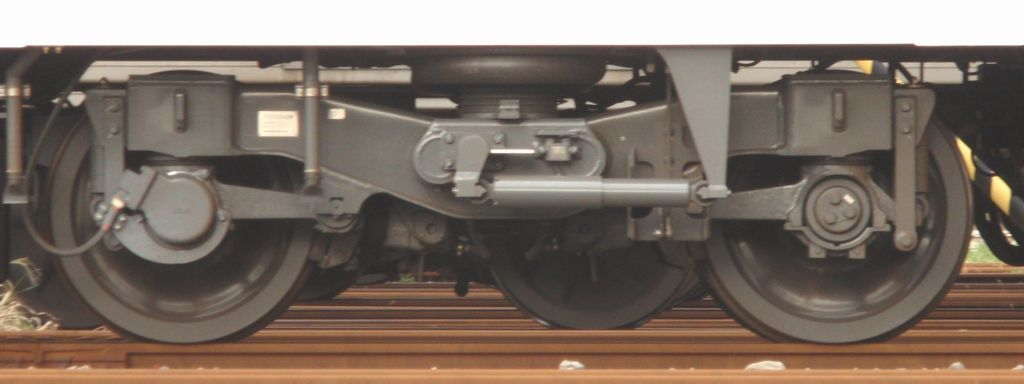
T262A trailer bogie

== Interior accommodation ==
The passenger compartment floor construction has been improved for reduced interior noise, and the height difference between the coach and the platform has been reduced by 50 mm (2.0 in) compared with the earlier 253 series trains for ease of access. Luggage storage areas feature lockable straps for security, and security cameras are installed in vestibule and luggage areas. Luggage space is also provided beneath the seats. Electric power outlets are provided at each seat.

Four ceiling-mounted passenger information display units are provided in each car. These feature two 17-inch screens on each side, displaying information in four languages (Japanese, English, Korean, and Chinese).

=== Ordinary class ===
Ordinary-class cars have 2+2 abreast seating with forward-facing rotating/reclining seats. Seat pitch is 1,030 mm (41 in), compared to 980 mm (39 in) on earlier trains.

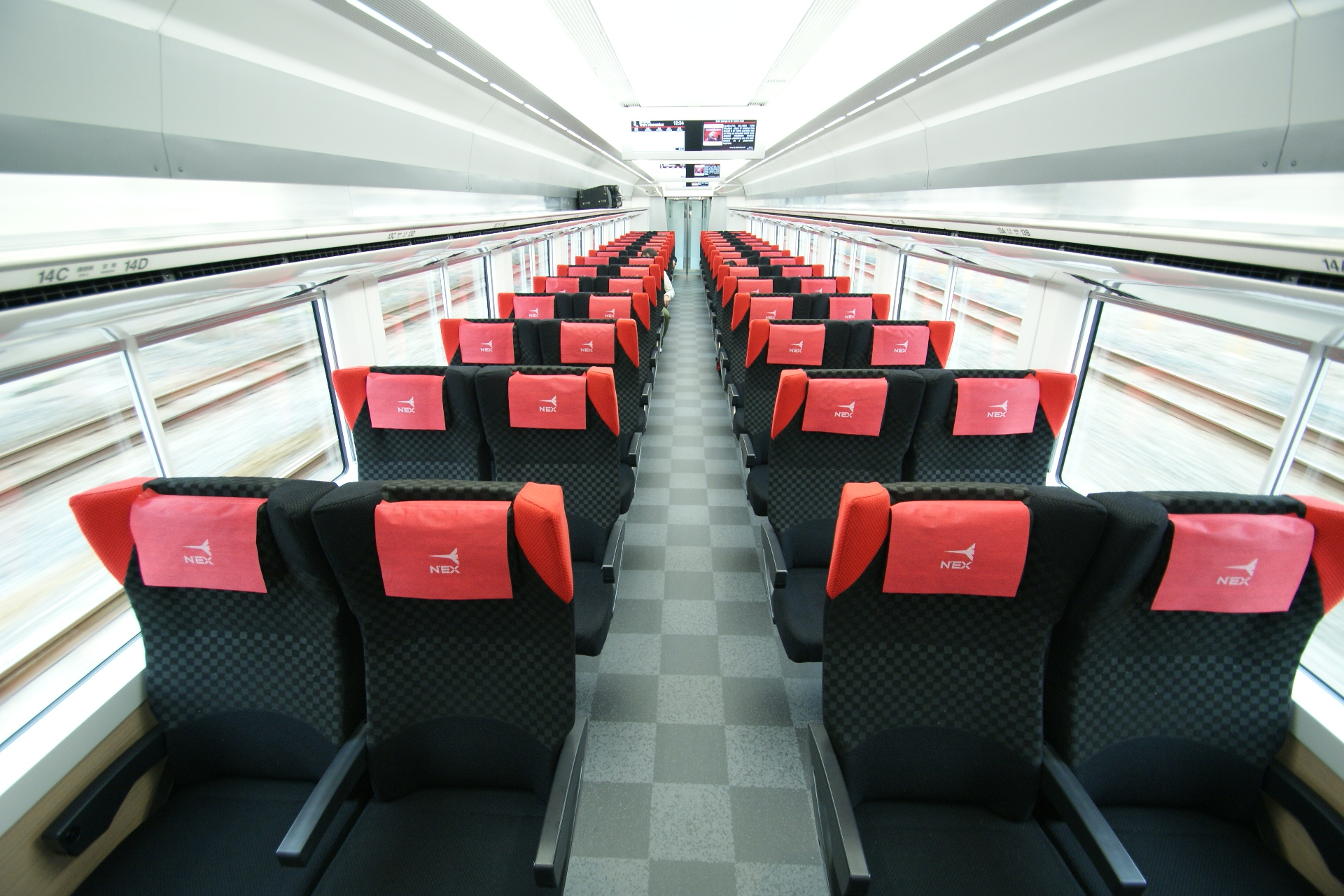
Ordinary-class car interior

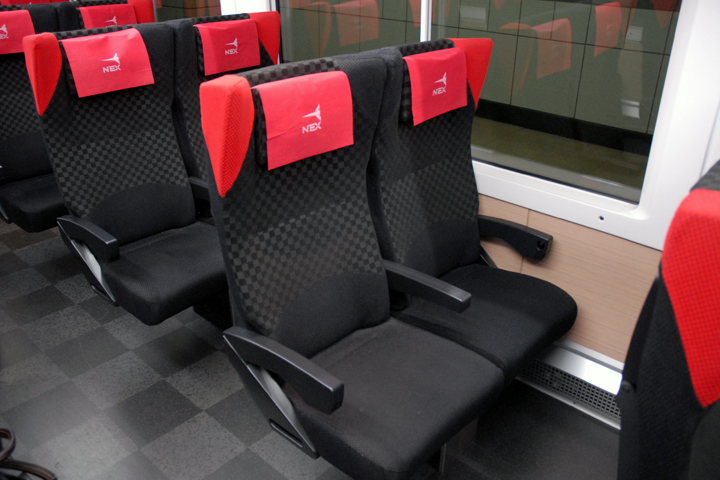
Ordinary-class seats

=== Green class ===
Green (first class) cars have leather-covered forward-facing rotating/reclining seats also arranged in 2+2 configuration. Seat pitch is 1,160 mm (46 in).

Green-class car interior

Green-class seats

== History ==
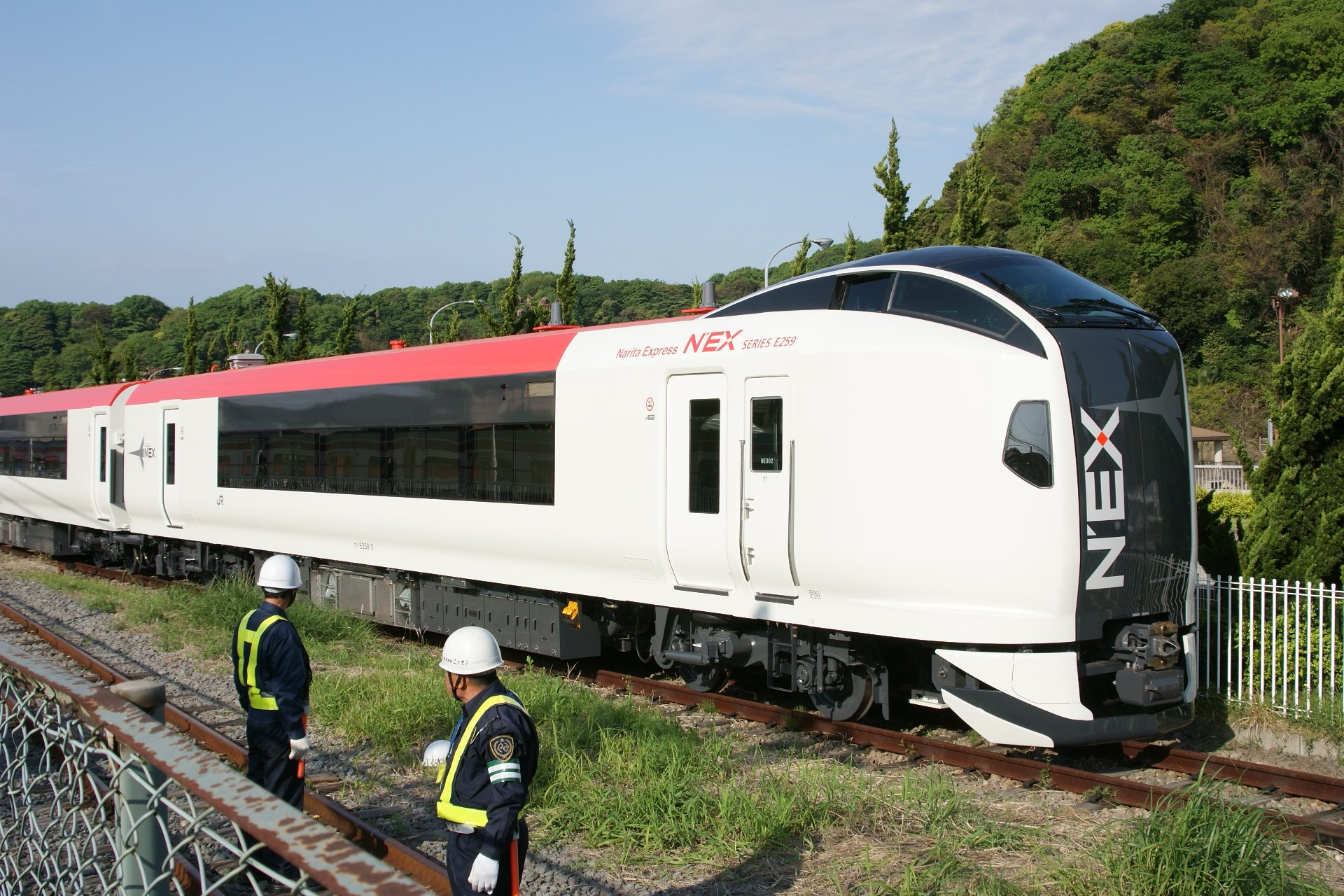
Sets Ne002 and Ne001 next to Jimmuji Station, Zushi, on delivery from Tokyu Car Corporation, April 2009

The first two sets, Ne001 and Ne002, were delivered to Kamakura Depot from Tokyu Car Corporation's Yokohama factory on 23 April 2009, with test running on the Sōbu Main Line commencing the same day.

Nine E259 series sets entered revenue service on Narita Express services from 1 October 2009, with 10 out of 26 return workings daily operated by E259s. By June 2010, they had completely replaced the 253 series EMUs formerly used on Narita Express services.

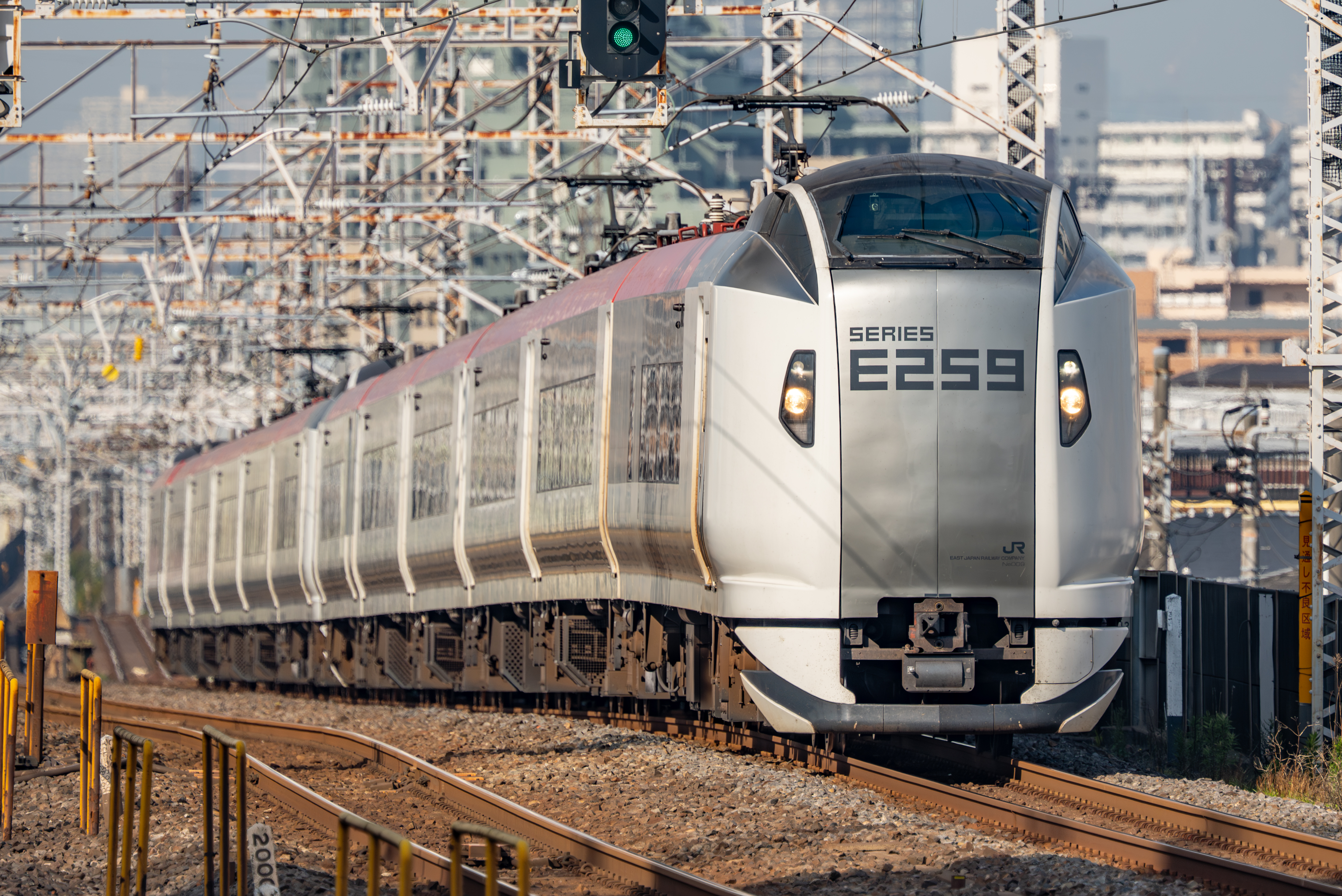
An E259 series set in updated livery in May 2024

In March 2023, JR East announced that it would introduce a new design to existing E259 series sets. The updated livery will retain the black and red color pallet but will feature silver accents at the front as well as the phrase "SERIES E259" being plastered along the exterior. As of 17 March 2024, repainting for the entire E259 series fleet was completed with the last set, Ne022, having received the new livery.

In December 2023, JR East announced that some E259 series sets will be used on most Shiosai limited express services from the start of the revised timetable on 16 March 2024, replacing the older 255 series EMUs used on these services.

== Build details ==
The manufacturers and delivery dates for the fleet are as shown below.

| Set No. | Manufacturer | Date delivered |
|---|---|---|
| Ne001 | Tokyu Car | 23 April 2009 |
| Ne002 | Tokyu Car | 23 April 2009 |
| Ne003 | Tokyu Car | 26 May 2009 |
| Ne004 | Tokyu Car | 26 May 2009 |
| Ne005 | Tokyu Car | 2 July 2009 |
| Ne006 | Tokyu Car | 2 July 2009 |
| Ne007 | Tokyu Car | 19 August 2009 |
| Ne008 | Tokyu Car | 19 August 2009 |
| Ne009 | Tokyu Car | 17 September 2009 |
| Ne010 | Tokyu Car | 17 September 2009 |
| Ne011 | Tokyu Car | 22 October 2009 |
| Ne012 | Tokyu Car | 22 October 2009 |
| Ne013 | Tokyu Car | 18 March 2010 |
| Ne014 | Tokyu Car | 18 March 2010 |
| Ne015 | Kinki Sharyo | 17 March 2010 |
| Ne016 | Tokyu Car | 30 March 2010 |
| Ne017 | Kinki Sharyo | 7 April 2010 |
| Ne018 | Kinki Sharyo | 21 April 2010 |
| Ne019 | Kinki Sharyo | 14 May 2010 |
| Ne020 | Tokyu Car | 18 May 2010 |
| Ne021 | Tokyu Car | 18 May 2010 |
| Ne022 | Kinki Sharyo | 9 June 2010 |

== See also ==
- Keisei AE series (2009), train operated by rival company Keisei
- NS Koploper, trains featuring a similar walk-through design
