= Yaw damper (railroad) =

Shock absorber for locomotives

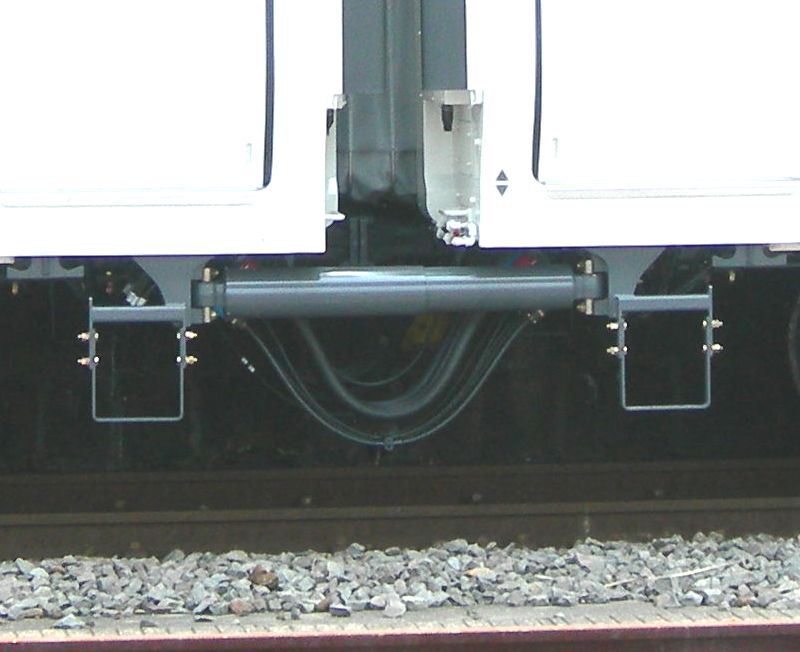
Yaw damper between cars of an E259 series EMU operated by JR East in Japan, June 2009

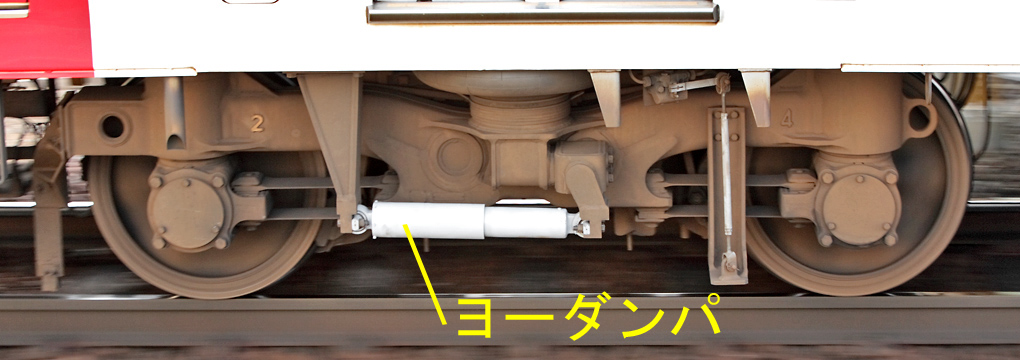
Another type of yaw damper, installed on a Meitetsu 2200 series bogie.

A yaw damper is a transverse mounted shock absorber used to prevent railcars and locomotives from swaying excessively from side to side. Yaw dampers prevent locomotives and passenger railcars from striking station platforms as they roll past them and reduce the gap that must be left between the railroad vehicle and the platform, improving safety.

== Overview ==
Yaw dampers control the sine wave effects of the bogie, assuring the safety of medium and high speeds. They are installed between the bogie and the car body, dissipating the mechanical energy by its hole throttle principle. It can reduce the lateral vibration of the vehicle system and depress the hunting motion. The inner instantaneous pressure, oil temperature and the proportion of mixed oil affect the dynamic viscosity, bulk modulus and density of oil in the damper.

== Types of yaw dampers ==
=== Switchable yaw damper ===
A switchable yaw damper is an electrically-controlled damper and a semi-active on-and-off device that trades off traditional yaw dampers with an additional control valve implemented to reduce the damping force. It has a short design that reduces the weariness of the wheel and rail and has a high dynamic rigidness. Due to the damper reducing the contact forces by shutting down the valve, it reduces the maintenance cost for vehicles and track sections caused by the wear.

=== Frequency selective yaw damper ===
A frequency selective yaw damper is a passive yaw damper that are equipped with a valve opening at different frequencies. As the pressure in the damper releases, the bogie can easily rotate without comprising the vehicle safety and stability at high speed velocities. When there is no need for an electronic connection, it is a passive hydraulic solution.
