= Narita Express =

Train service from Narita airport to Tokyo

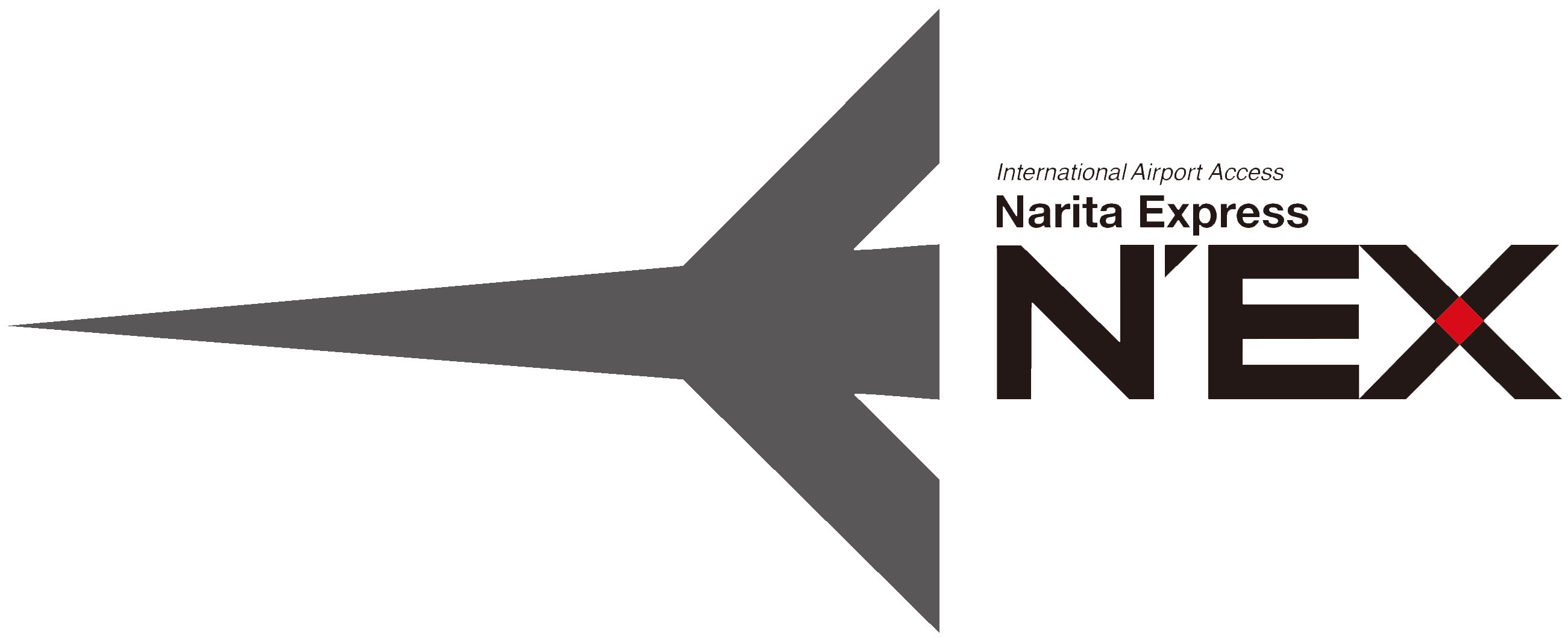

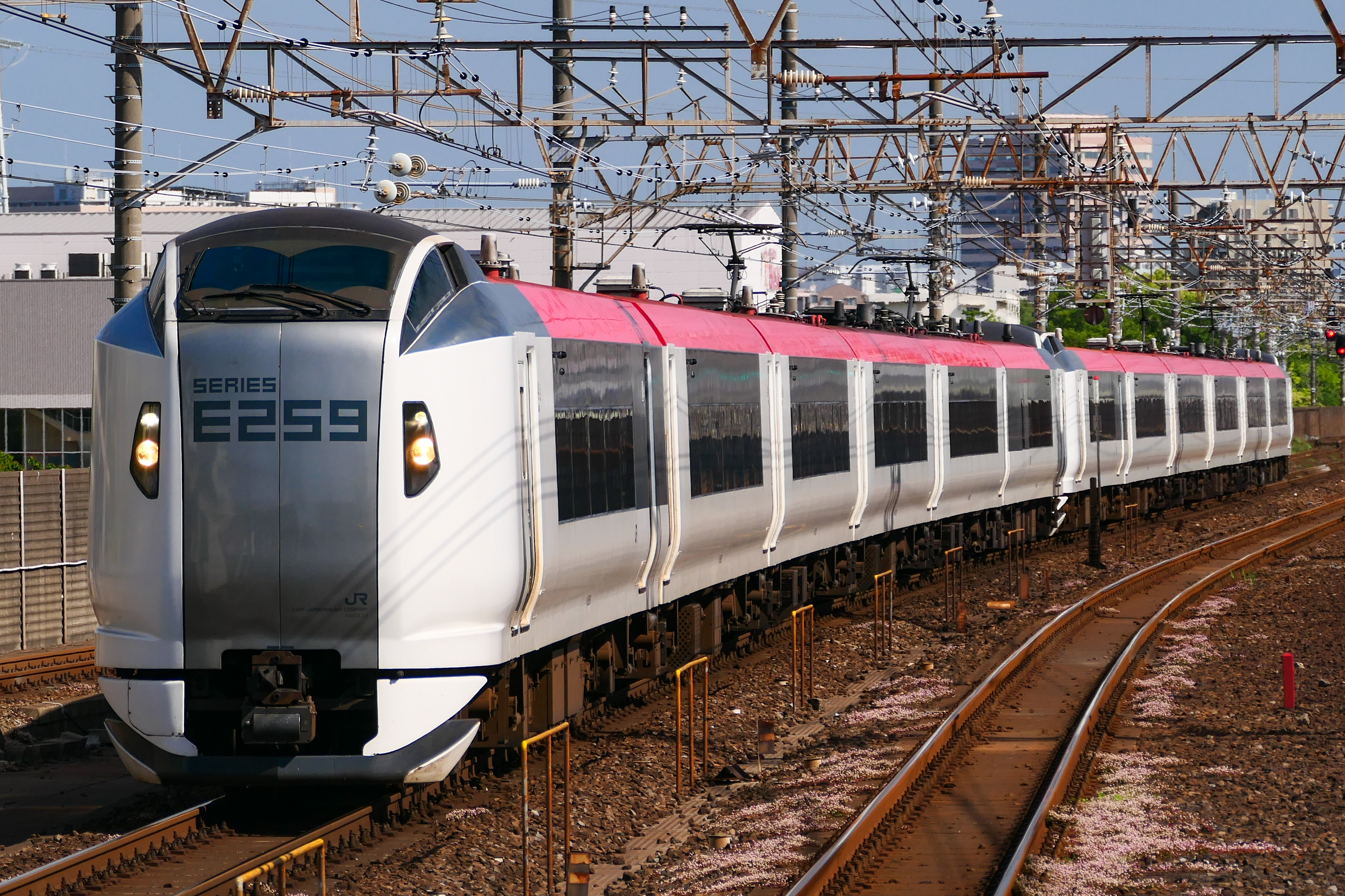
- E259 series EMUs on a Narita Express service, May 2024

Overview
- Service type: Airport rail link (Limited express)
- Locale: Kanto region, Japan
- First service: 19 March 1991
- Current operator: JR East
- Website: www.jreast.co.jp/e/nex

Route
- Termini: Narita Airport Terminal 1 Shinjuku or Ōfuna
- Stops: 11
- Distance travelled: 105 km (65 mi)
- Lines used: Yokosuka, Yamanote Freight, Sobu Rapid, Narita

On-board services
- Class: Standard + Green
- Catering facilities: Trolley service
- Baggage facilities: Lockable baggage areas

Technical
- Rolling stock: E259 series
- Track gauge: 1,067 mm (3 ft 6 in)
- Electrification: Overhead line, 1,500 V DC
- Operating speed: 130 km/h (80 mph)

The Narita Express (Japanese: 成田エクスプレス, Hepburn: Narita ekusupuresu), abbreviated as N'EX, is a limited express train service operated in Japan since 1991 by East Japan Railway Company (JR East), serving Narita International Airport from various Greater Tokyo Area stations. Services run approximately half-hourly in the mornings and evenings, and hourly through the middle of the day. The main competition for the Narita Express is Keisei Electric Railway's Skyliner.

== Trains and destinations ==
Narita Express trains serve various stations in the Greater Tokyo Area. Trains are formed of dedicated E259 series 6-car EMU sets, with all trains passing through Tokyo Station, where services are coupled or uncoupled. Usually, a train from Ōfuna is coupled with a train from Shinjuku to form one train set for the remainder of the journey to Narita Airport (via the Sōbu Main Line and Narita Line). On the return journey, the reverse is true.

The majority of Narita Express services do not stop between Tokyo and Narita Airport Terminal 2·3 Station. During rush hours, however, the Narita Express serves as a commuter express, stopping at Chiba, Yotsukaidō, Sakura, and Narita. The average time between Tokyo and Narita Airport is between 55 minutes and an hour. All seats are reserved, with both Standard and Green (first class) accommodation available.

== History ==
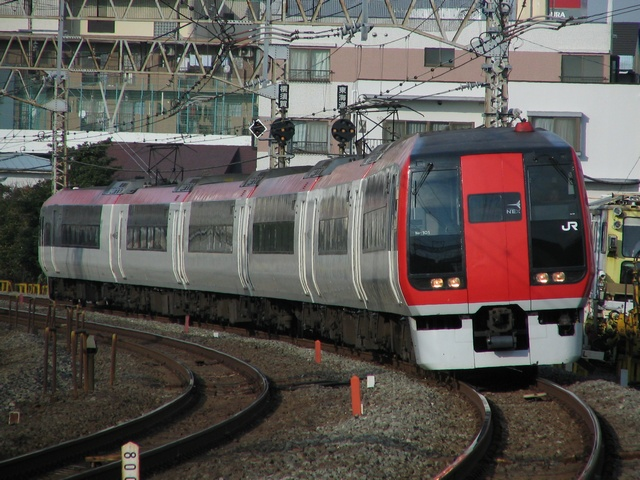
A Narita Express 253 series train in December 2006

Until 1991, rail service to Narita Airport was limited to the Keisei Skyliner, which at the time used a station separated from the terminal complex. JR had initially planned to run a high-speed line, the Narita Shinkansen, to a station underneath the main airport terminal. This plan was abandoned in the 1980s, and the space originally slated for the underground station and Shinkansen tracks was used to connect both the JR Narita Line and Keisei Main Line directly to the terminal. The Narita Express began service to the new station on 19 March 1991, and Skyliner switched its service to the new station at the same time.

Until March 2004, the Wing Express limited express service was introduced to complement the Narita Express with one return working a day between Ōmiya/Ikebukuro/Shinjuku and Narita Airport. This service was subsequently replaced by an additional Narita Express service.

From the start of the revised timetable on 10 December 2005, Narita Express services were made entirely no-smoking.

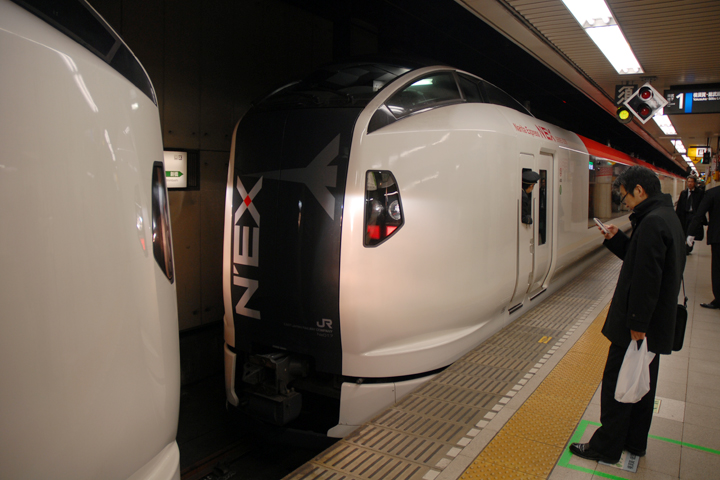
Two E259 series trainsets dividing at Tokyo Station, February 2011

On 1 October 2009, nine new E259 series EMU trains were brought into service on 10 of 26 return Narita Express services, replacing the 253 series. By June 2010 all Narita Express trains were operated by E259 series equipment.

From the start of the revised timetable on 13 March 2010, Narita Express service frequencies were increased with more splitting and combining of trains at Tokyo Station. Service is provided between Narita Airport and Tokyo, Shinjuku and Yokohama every 30 minutes during most of the day. All trains operating to/from Shinjuku now stop at Shibuya, and all trains to/from Yokohama now stop at the new Musashi-Kosugi Station.

Narita Express services were suspended from 11 March 2011 due to the effects of the Great East Japan earthquake and tsunami and subsequent power supply shortage in the Tokyo area. They were partially restored from 4 April 2011, with the remaining pre-earthquake and tsunami timetable and services finally re-instated on 3 September 2011.

Starting in 2014 the Narita Express offered seasonal services on some routes. From Ōfuna, a small number of seasonal trains continued to Kamakura and Yokosuka on the Yokosuka Line, and from Takao, a small number of seasonal trains continued to Otsuki and Kawaguchiko on the Fujikyuko Line. The services to Yokosuka station were discontinued in January 2017 due to low travel numbers, while in March 2019 the Kawaguchiko services were replaced by the new, daily Fuji Excursion limited express.

Due a reduction in international travel caused by the COVID-19 pandemic, services were reduced to a few trains running in the morning and evening from 1 May 2020, with services between Hachioji and Takao discontinued from 13 March 2021. While services were partially restored from 12 March 2022, services to Ikebukuro or Ōmiya were discontinued and more trains began to make stop at Chiba. All services were reinstated on 1 October 2022 prior to Japan lifting its entry restrictions for foreign travelers. Outside of peak commuter times about one out of every two services continue to stop at Chiba, with the others running nonstop between Tokyo and the airport.

== Rolling stock ==
=== Formations ===
As of March 2012, services operate as twelve-car formations, as shown below, with car 1 at the Shinjuku/Yokohama end, and car 12 at the Narita Airport end. All seats on the Narita Express service are reserved, with Green (first class) car accommodation in cars 6 and 12.

Car No.	1	2	3	4	5	6	7	8	9	10	11	12
Numbering	KuHa E258	MoHa E258	MoHa E259	MoHa E258-500	MoHa E259-500	KuRo E259	KuHa E258	MoHa E258	MoHa E259	MoHa E258-500	MoHa E259-500	KuRo E259
Accommodation	Reserved					Green	Reserved					Green

=== Interior ===
Green (first class) cars have leather-covered forward-facing rotating/reclining seats arranged in 2+2 abreast configuration. Seat pitch is 1,160 mm (46 in). Standard class cars have 2+2 abreast seating with forward-facing rotating/reclining seats and a seat pitch of 1,020 mm (40 in).

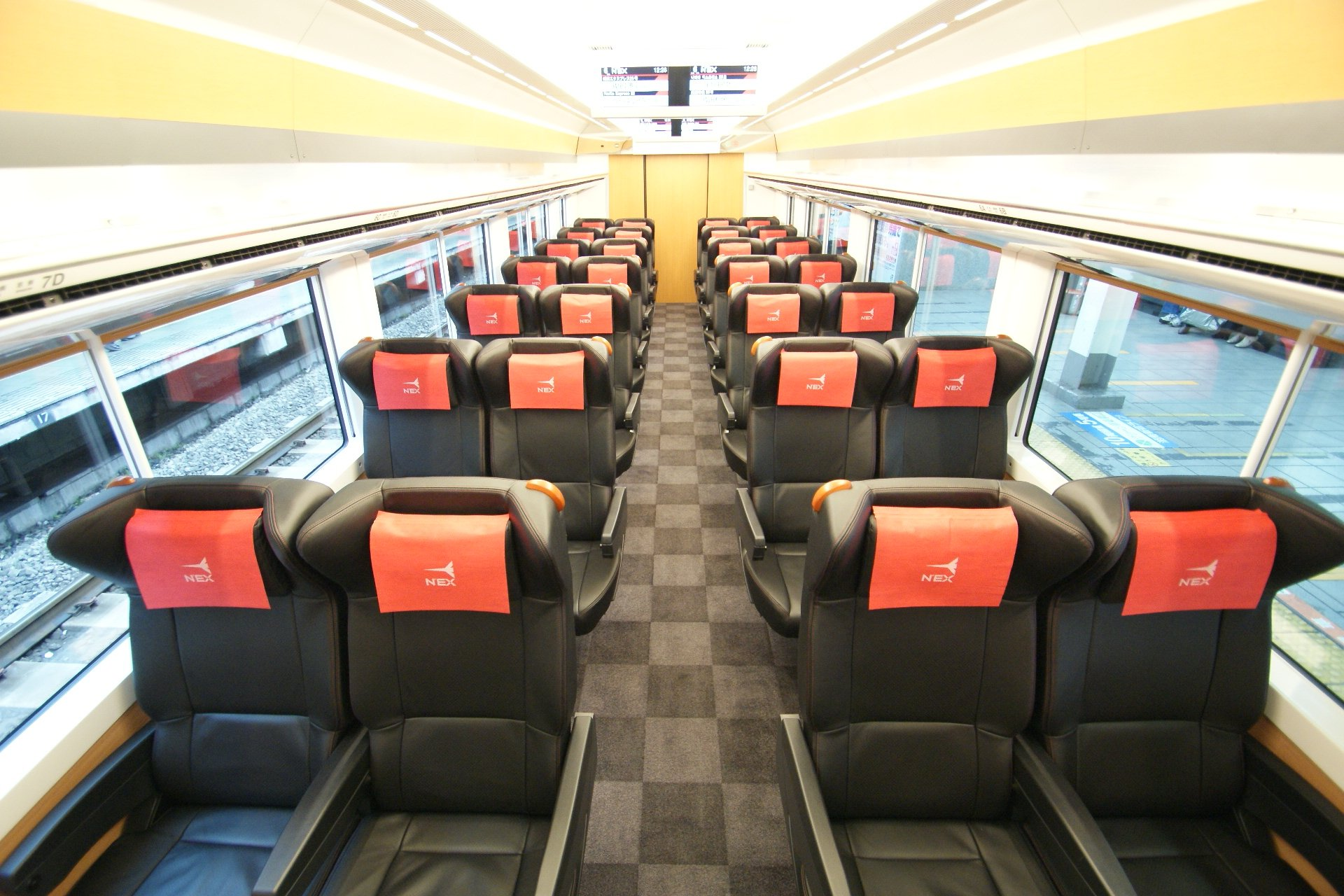
Green car interior

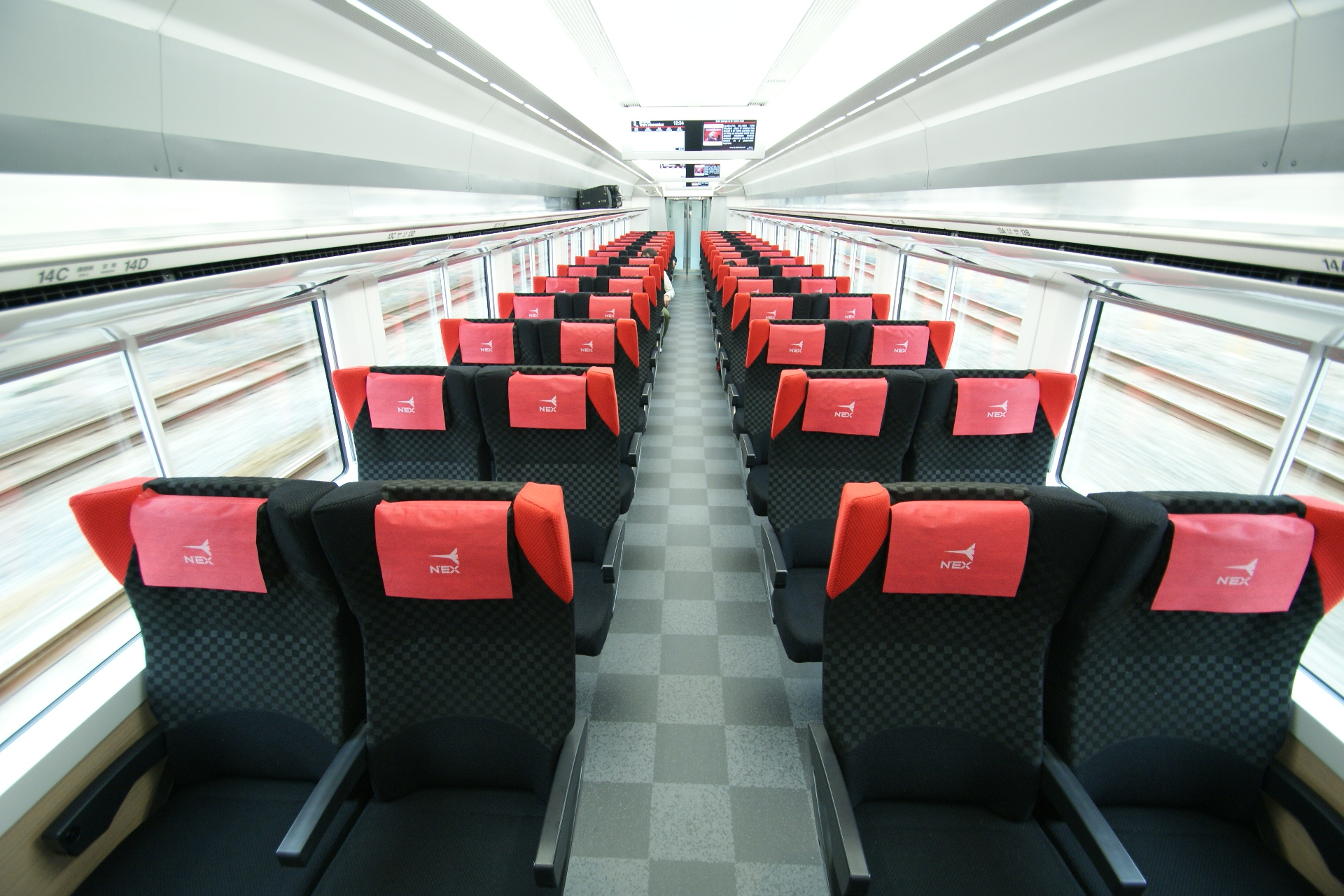
Standard-class car interior

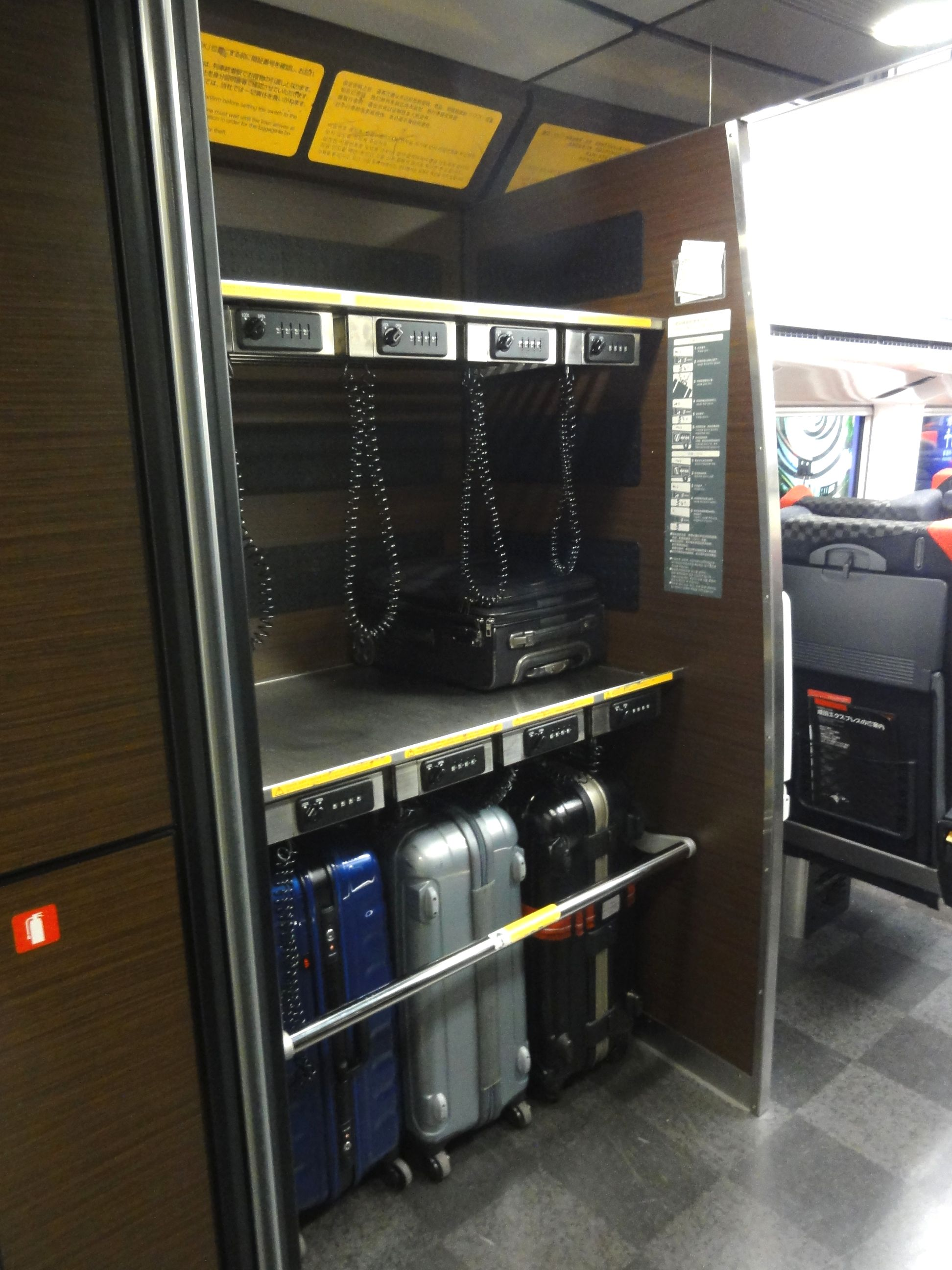
Lockable luggage storage area

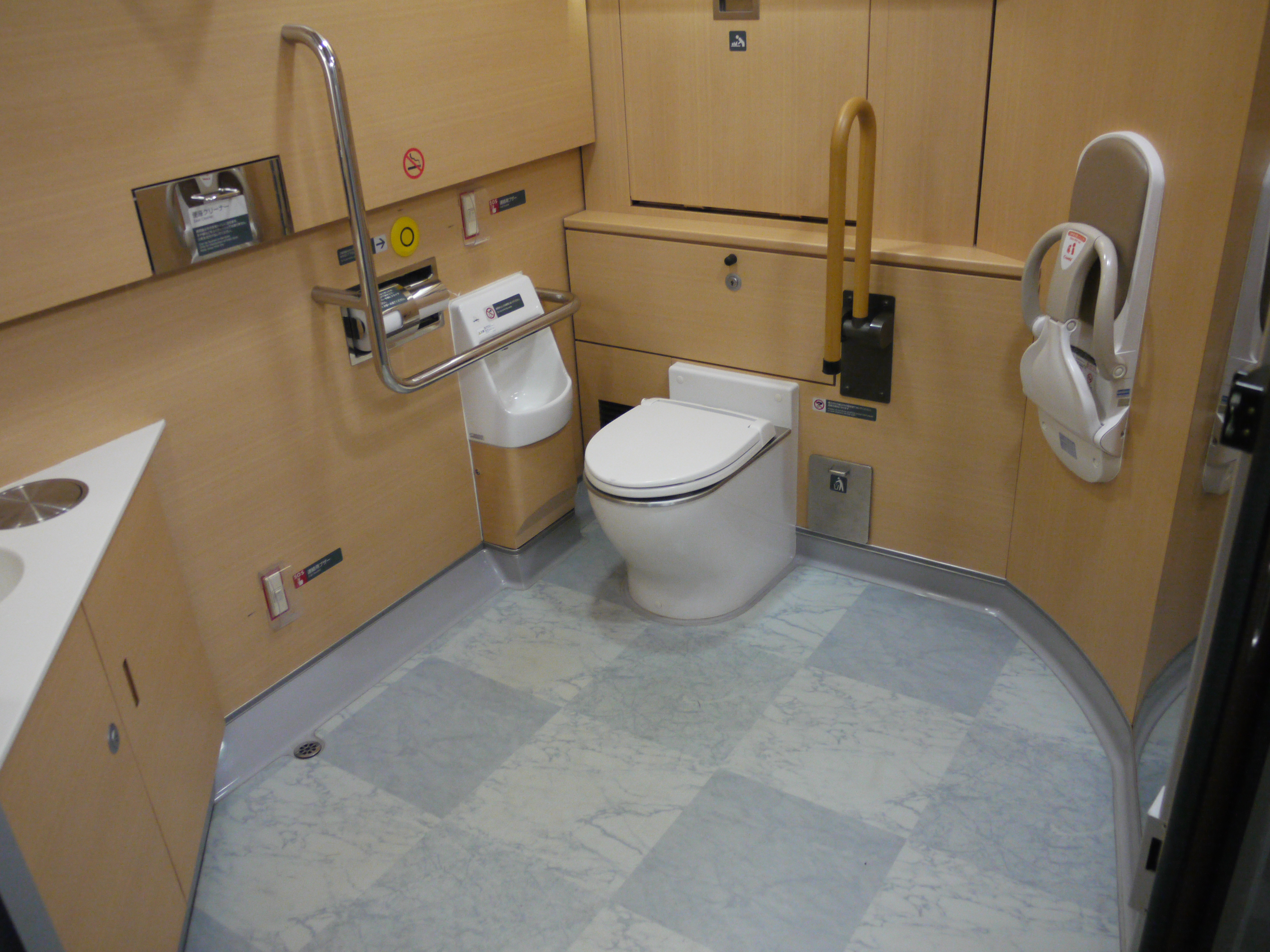
Green car toilet

== See also ==
- List of named passenger trains of Japan
