= 2100 series =

2100 series may refer to the following Japanese train types:

- Chikuho Electric Railroad 2100 series electric multiple unit operated on the Chikuhō Electric Railroad Line
- Ichibata Electric Railway 2100 series EMU
- Izukyū Corporation 2100 series EMU
- Iyotetsu 2100 series streetcar
- Kanto Railway KiHa 2100 series DMU
- Keikyu 2100 series EMU, introduced in 1998
- Keisei 2100 series EMU; see 209 series § 209-2000/2100 series
- Nagano Electric Railway 2100 series EMU, introduced in 2011
- Odakyu 2100 series EMU, see Odakyu 2000 series
