= Nagano Electric Railway 2000 series =

Japanese train type

2000 series
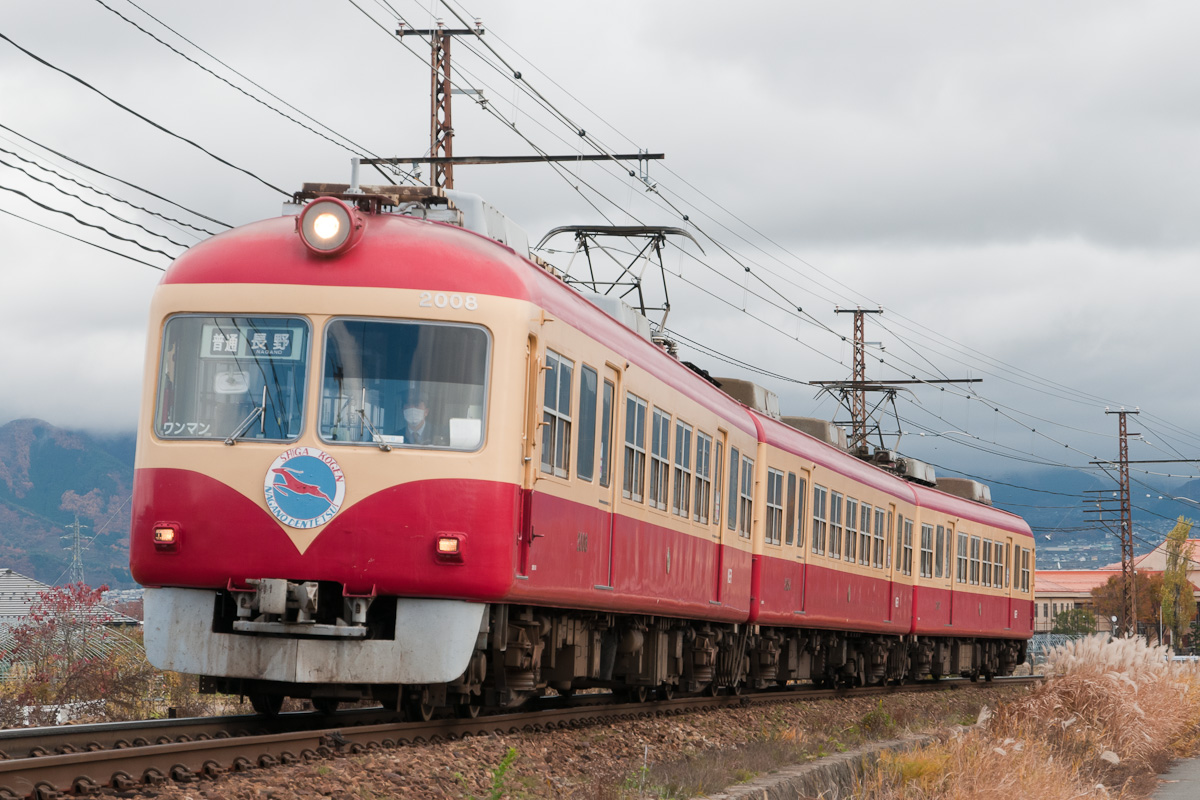
- Set D, September 2007
- In service: March 1957 – March 2012
- Manufacturer: Nippon Sharyo
- Built at: Tokyo/Nagoya
- Number built: 12 vehicles (4 sets)
- Number in service: None
- Number preserved: 3 vehicles (1 set)
- Number scrapped: 9 vehicles (3 sets)
- Formation: 3 cars per trainset
- Fleet numbers: A–D
- Operators: Nagano Electric Railway

Specifications
- Car body construction: Steel
- Car length: 18 m (59 ft 1 in)
- Doors: 2 per side
- Electric system(s): 1,500 V DC
- Current collection: Overhead catenary
- Track gauge: 1,067 mm (3 ft 6 in)

The Nagano Electric Railway 2000 series (長野電鉄2000系) was a DC electric multiple unit (EMU) train type operated by the private railway operator Nagano Electric Railway in Japan from March 1957 until March 2012.

== Formations ==
The sets were formed as follows.

Set	Mc1	T	Mc2	Delivered	A/C added	Withdrawn
A	MoHa 2001	SaHa 2051	MoHa 2002	February 1957	May 1990	March 2011
B	MoHa 2003	SaHa 2052	MoHa 2004	February 1957	July 1989	August 2005
C	MoHa 2005	SaHa 2053	MoHa 2006	November 1959	July 1990	December 2006
D	MoHa 2007	SaHa 2054	MoHa 2008	August 1964	May 1989	

The Mc1 and Mc2 cars were each fitted with one lozenge-type pantograph.

== Exterior ==
The first three sets (A to C) delivered trains were finished in a deep maroon livery with a thin waistline stripe and end "whiskers". Set D was delivered in a two-tone livery of maroon and cream. All sets were subsequently repainted into the same two-tone livery, and this was replaced by a revised livery with crimson window band when the sets were modified with air-conditioning from 1989 to 1990. In 2007, set A was returned to its original deep maroon livery, and set D was repainted into its original crimson and cream "apple" livery.

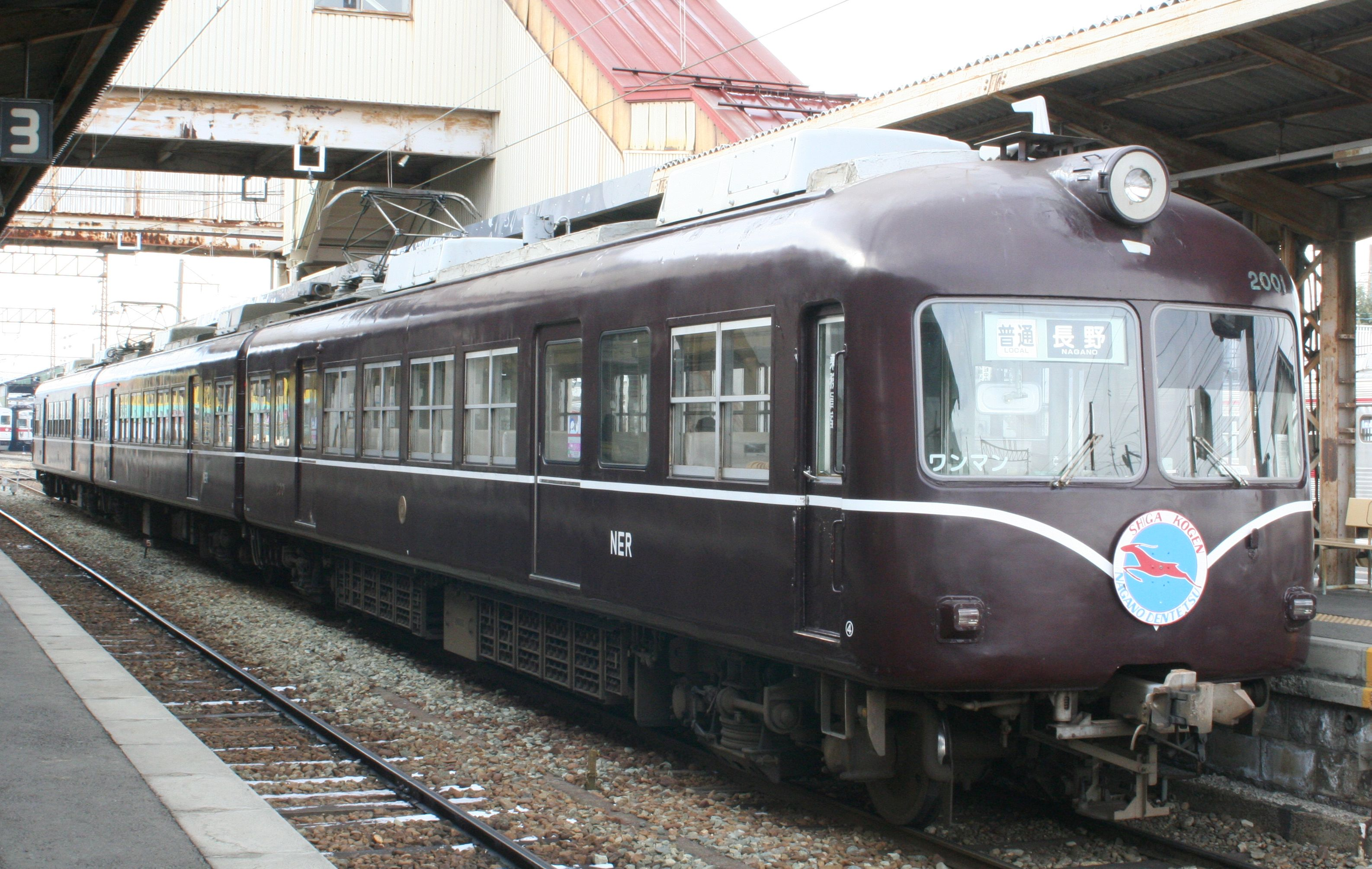
Set A in original deep maroon livery, January 2011

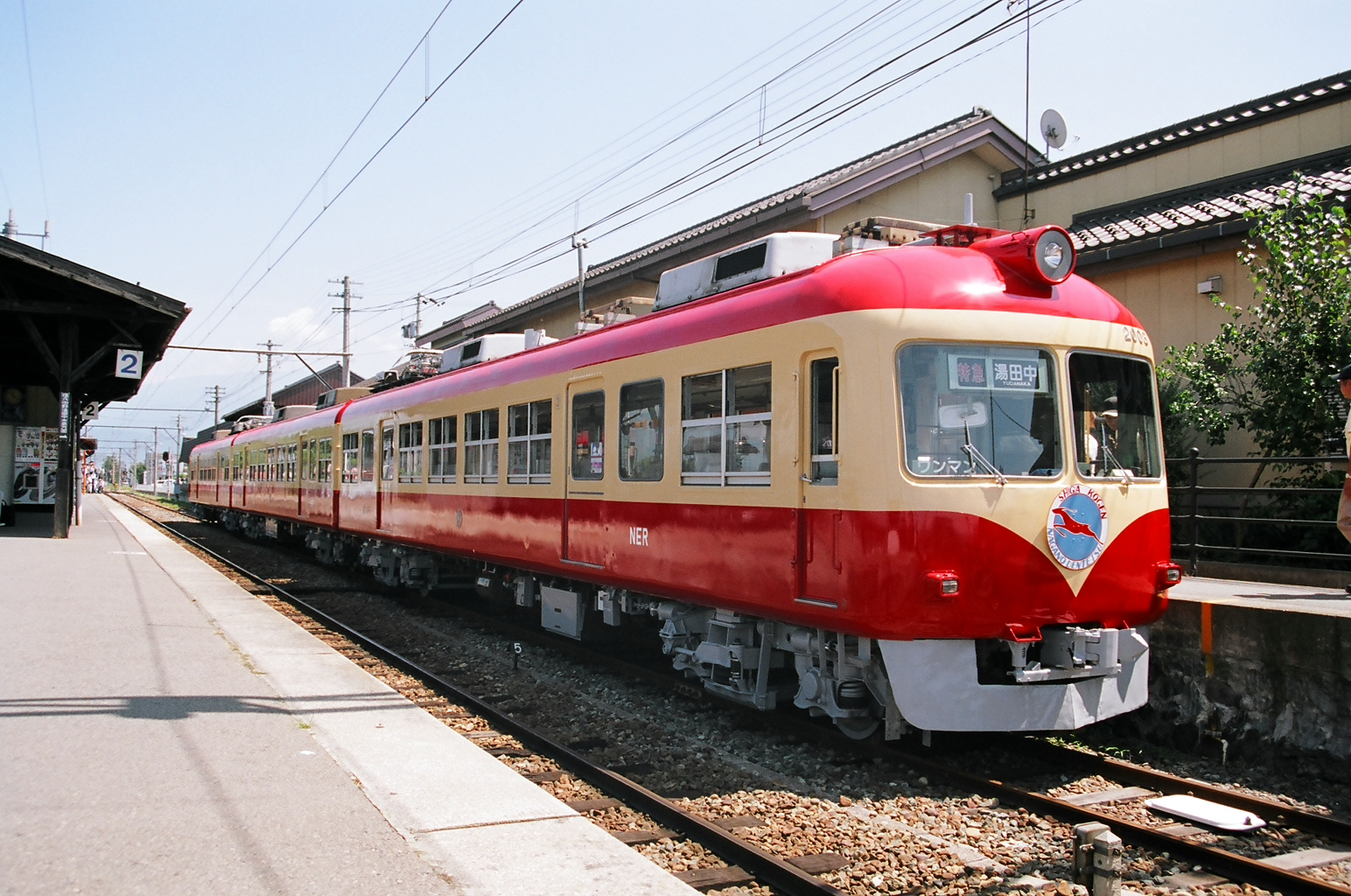
Set D repainted into its original "apple" livery, August 2007

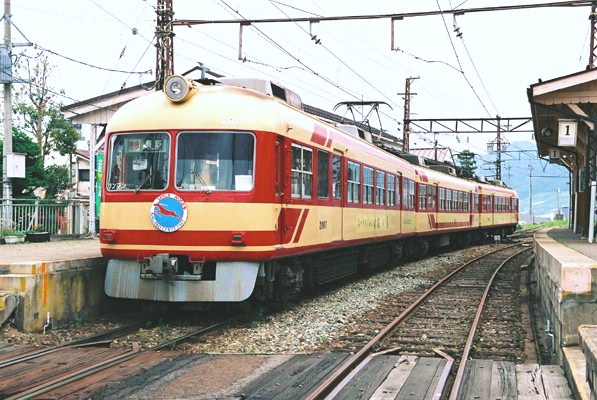
Set D in revised crimson and cream livery, May 2006

== Interior ==
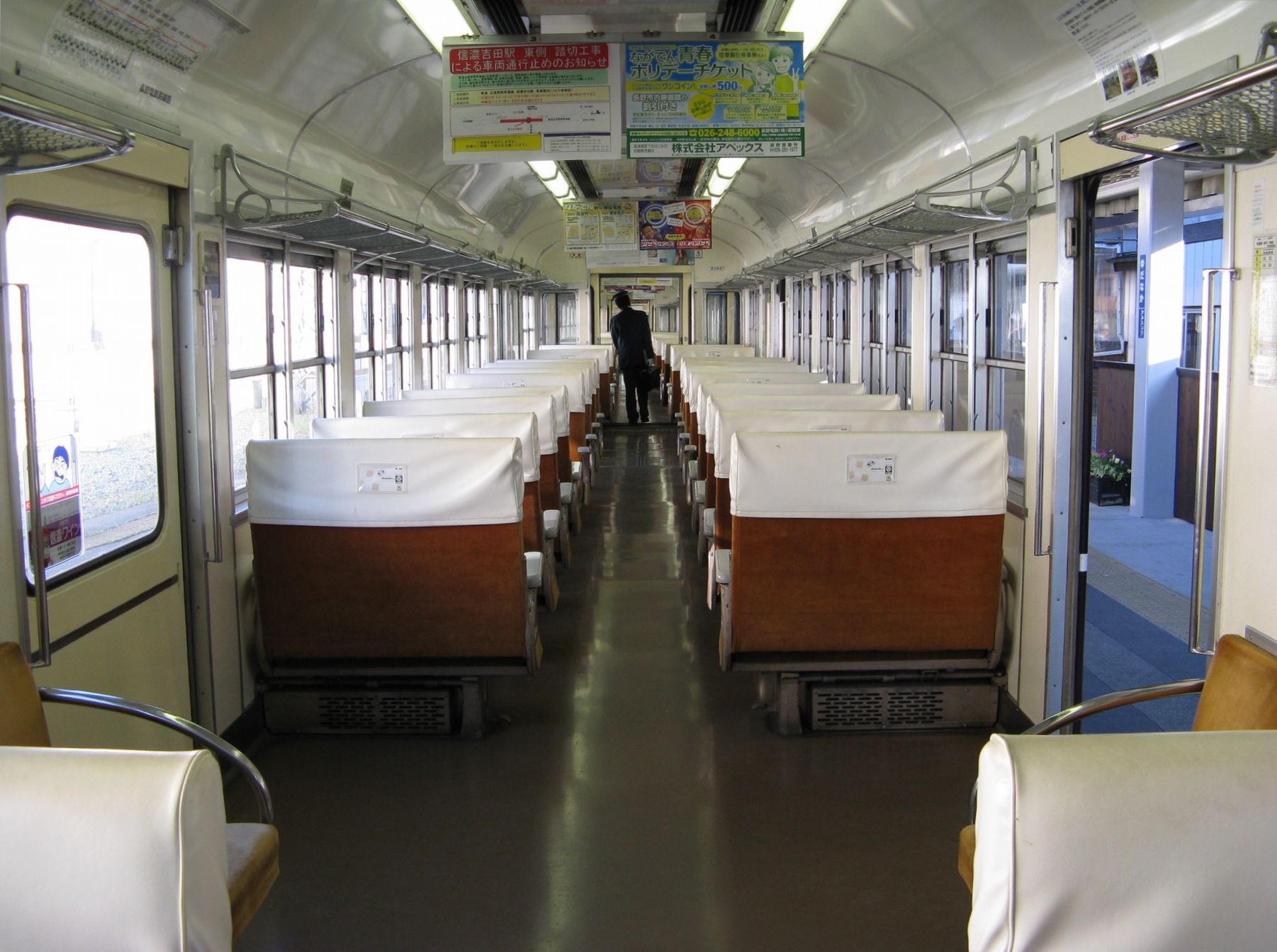
Interior of MoHa 2002 car, May 2005

The sets had pairs of seats that rotate to face the direction of travel.

== History ==
The first two sets (A and B) were delivered in February 1957 from Nippon Sharyo's Tokyo factory, and entered service from March 1957. The 2nd-batch set (set C) was delivered in November 1959 from Nippon Sharyo's Tokyo factory, and the 3rd-batch set (set D) was delivered in August 1964 from Nippon Sharyo's Nagoya factory.

Sets B and C were withdrawn in 2005 and 2006 respectively following the introduction of 1000 series EMUs. With the introduction of new 2100 series EMUs, set A was withdrawn in March 2011, and set D was also removed from regular service, except for special services, and while final withdrawal was originally scheduled for August 2011, it was kept in occasional use up until March 2013.
