= 253 series =

Japanese train type

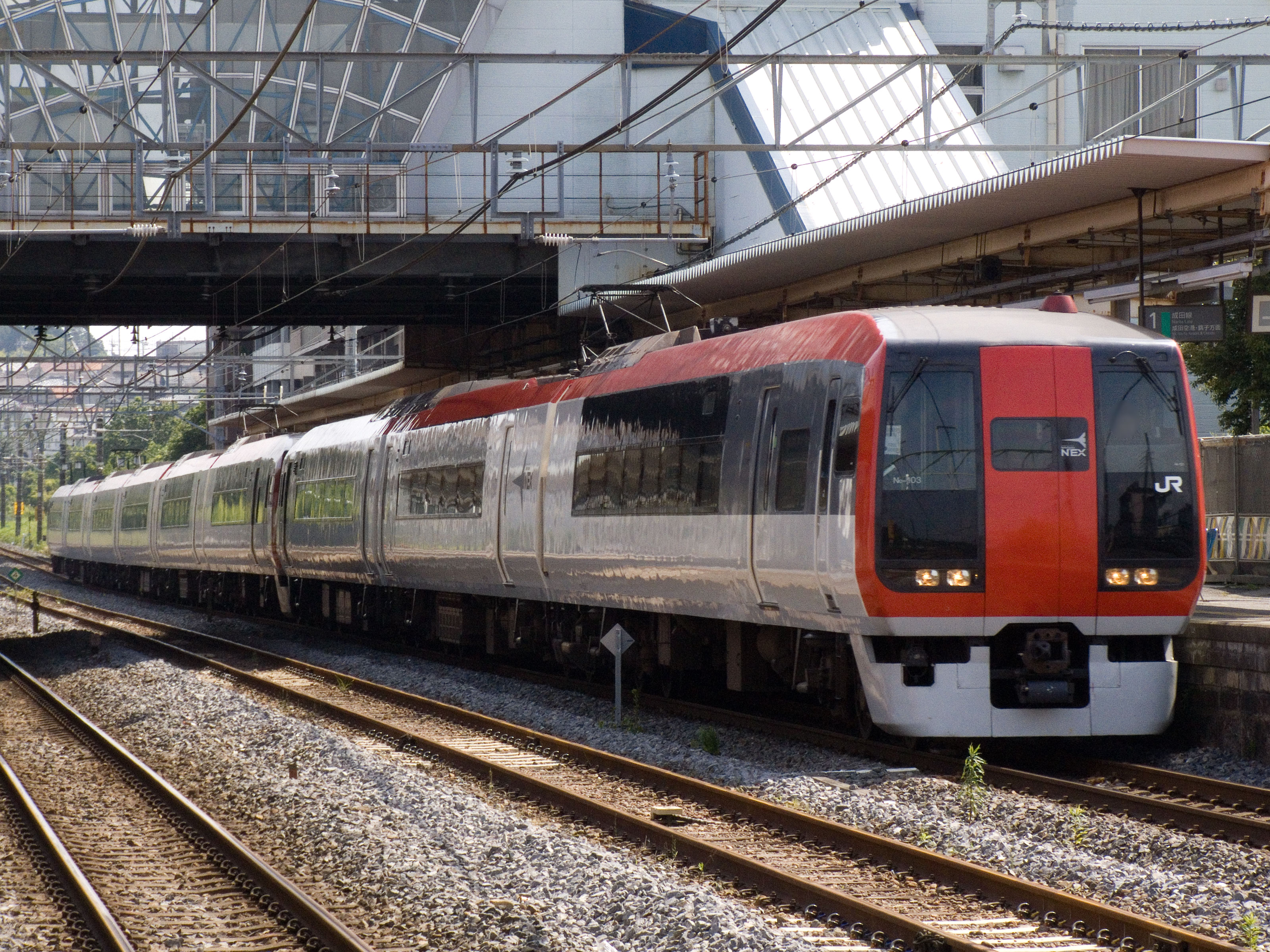
- A 253 series train on a Narita Express service in June 2008
- In service: 1991–present
- Manufacturers: Kinki Sharyo, Tokyu Car Corporation
- Replaced: 189 series, 485 series (Nikkō sets only)
- Constructed: 1990–2002
- Entered service: 19 March 1991
- Refurbished: 2010
- Number built: 111 vehicles
- Number in service: 12 vehicles (2 sets)
- Number scrapped: 93 vehicles
- Successor: E259 series (Narita Express)
- Formation: 6 cars per trainset (3 cars in the past)
- Fleet numbers: OM-N1 – OM-N2 (253-1000 series) Former: Ne01–Ne11; Ne101–Ne110; Ne201–Ne202
- Operator: JR East
- Depot: Omiya
- Lines served: Yamanote Freight Line, Tohoku Main Line, Tobu Nikko Line

Specifications
- Car body construction: Steel
- Car length: 20,930 mm (68 ft 8 in) (end cars); 20,500 mm (67 ft 3 in) (intermediate cars)
- Width: 2,946 mm (9 ft 8 in)
- Doors: 2 per side
- Maximum speed: 130 km/h (81 mph)
- Traction system: Resistor control + field system superimposed field excitation control (253-0/200 series); Variable frequency (IGBT) (253-1000 series)
- Electric systems: 1,500 V DC (overhead wire)
- Current collection: Pantograph
- Bogies: DT69, TR254 (253-200 series only)
- Braking systems: Regenerative brake, electronically controlled pneumatic brakes
- Safety systems: ATS-P, ATS-SN, ATC-5 (not used), Tōbu ATS (253-1000 series only)
- Track gauge: 1,067 mm (3 ft 6 in)

The 253 series (253系) is a DC electric multiple unit (EMU) train type operated by East Japan Railway Company (JR East). It was introduced on 19 March 1991 for use exclusively on the Narita Express, a limited express service linking Narita International Airport with stations in the Tokyo area. The 253 series trains were withdrawn from Narita Express services on 30 June 2010, with two trains redeployed on Nikkō and Kinugawa limited express services from June 2011.

== Design ==
The design was overseen by industrial designer Kenji Ekuan, and the trains were manufactured by Kinki Sharyo and Tokyu Car Corporation. Sets were formed as three-car and six-car units, running as up to 12-car formations in service. From 1 October 2009, all three-car sets were removed from Narita Express operations.

It was the recipient of the 32nd Laurel Prize of the Japan Railfan Club. Extra sets were built in 2002 to cope with the increase in traffic during the 2002 FIFA World Cup. These sets were classified 253-200 series, and included minor improvements over the original 253-0 and 253-100 series sets, such as LED destination indicators, conventional rotating seats in standard class, and 2+1 seating in Green Cars.

== Operations ==
=== Nikkō/Kinugawa (from June 2011) ===
- Tohoku Main Line
- Tobu Nikko Line
- Tobu Kinugawa Line
- Yamanote Freight Line

=== Narita Express (1991–2010) ===
- Chūō Main Line
- Narita Line (Airport branch)
- Sōbu Main Line
- Yamanote Freight Line
- Yokosuka Line
- Saikyo Line

== Variants ==
=== 1st batch ===
63 coaches (21 trains in three-car formation) were manufactured in 1990 and entered service in 1991. The types of coaches were the KuRo 253 (Green Car driving trailer), MoHa 253 (trailer) and KuMoHa 252 (driving trailer) coaches. Three-car sets were sometimes joined to form six-car formations.

=== 2nd-4th batches ===
36 coaches were manufactured in 1992 to 1996 to cope with an increase in passenger traffic on the Narita Express, eventually enabling the 253 series trains to run in 12-car formations as well as the older 3/6-car formations. Minor changes were observed in the interior, notably that the seats had two colours, black and red.

=== 5th batch ===
The fifth batch of 253 series trains (classified 253-200 series) consisting of two six-car sets, Ne201 and Ne202, were delivered from Tokyu Car in 2002 in anticipation of the 2002 FIFA World Cup which was expected to further increase passenger traffic on the Narita Express. Variable frequency traction systems were built into these trains, and they were fitted with DT69 and TR254 bogies. The interior differed from previous batches, with LED destination indicators, conventional rotating seats in standard class, and 2+1 seating in Green cars.

== Formations ==
=== 6-car sets Ne01–11 ===
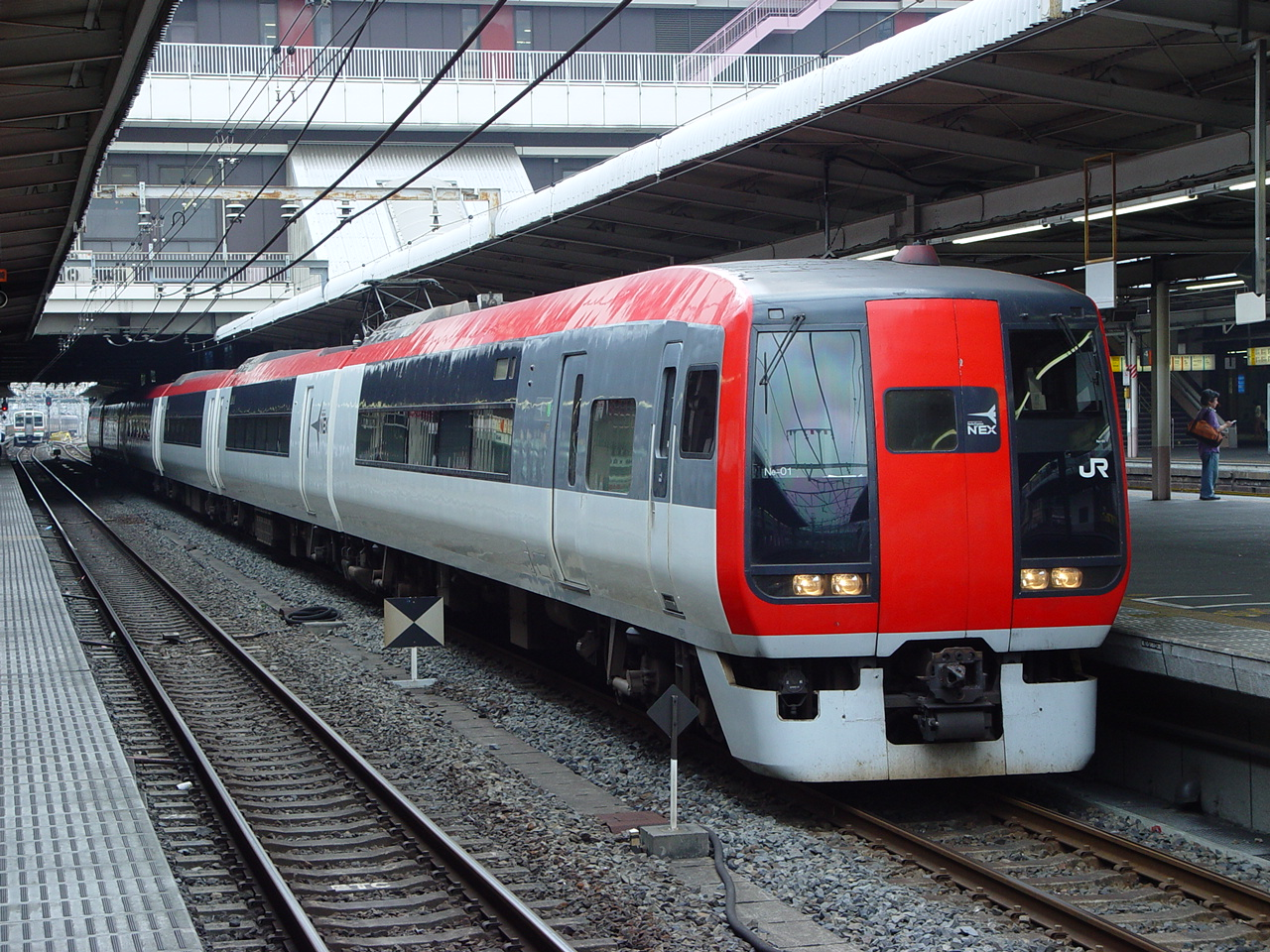
Six-car set Ne01 in June 2002

Car No.	1	2	3	4	5	6
Designation	M'c	M	T	M'	M1	Tsc
Numbering	KuMoHa 252	MoHa 253	SaHa 253	MoHa 252	MoHa 253-100	KuRo 253

=== 6-car set Ne101 ===
Car No.	1	2	3	4	5	6
Designation	M'c	M	T	M'	M1	Tsc
Numbering	KuMoHa 252	MoHa 253	SaHa 253	MoHa 252	MoHa 253-100	KuRo 253-100

=== 3-car sets Ne102–110 ===
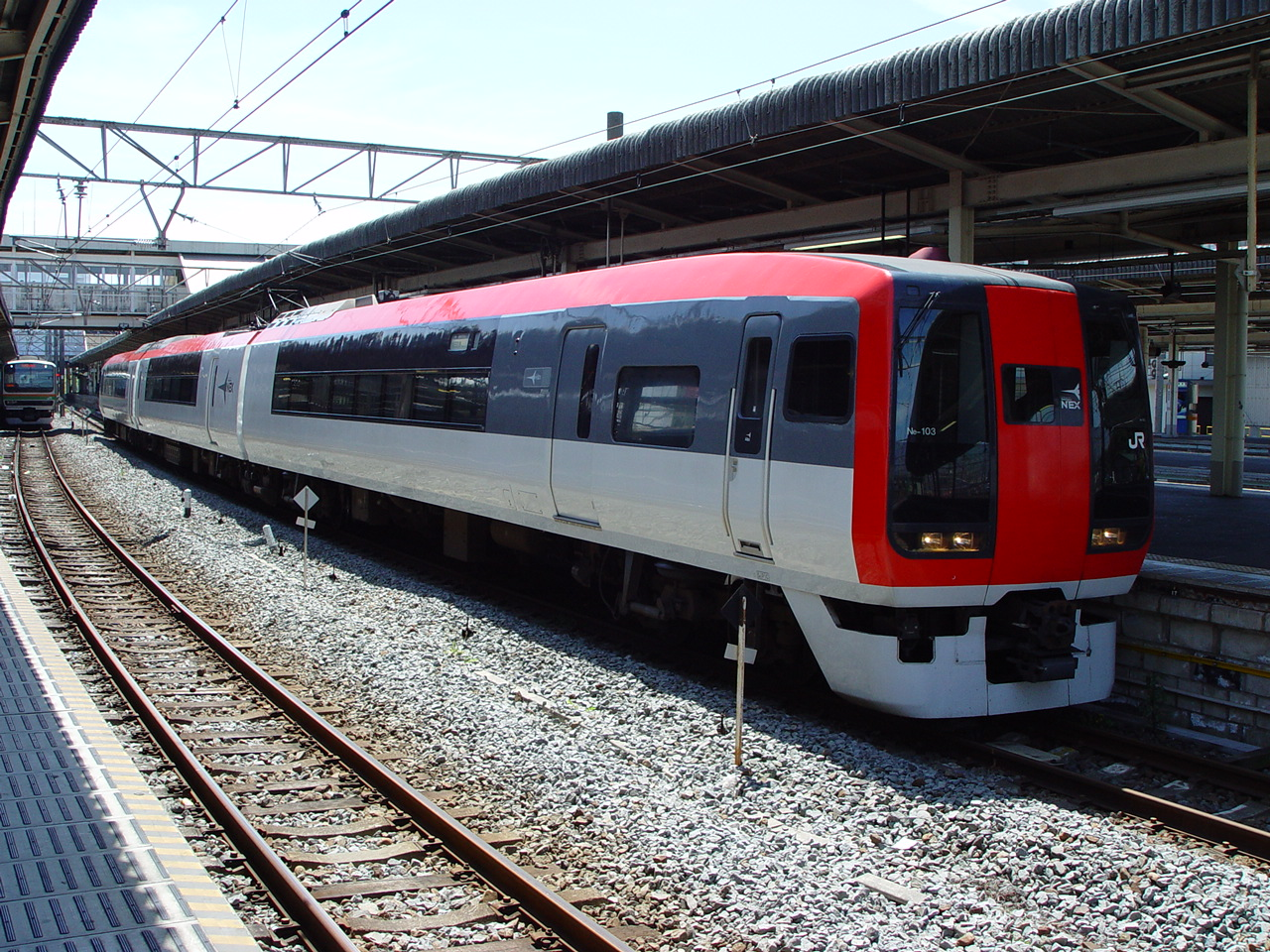
Three-car set Ne103 in April 2003

Car No.	1	2	3
Designation	M'c	M	Ts_{R}c
Numbering	KuMoHa 252	MoHa 253	KuRoHa 253

=== 6-car sets Ne201–202 ===
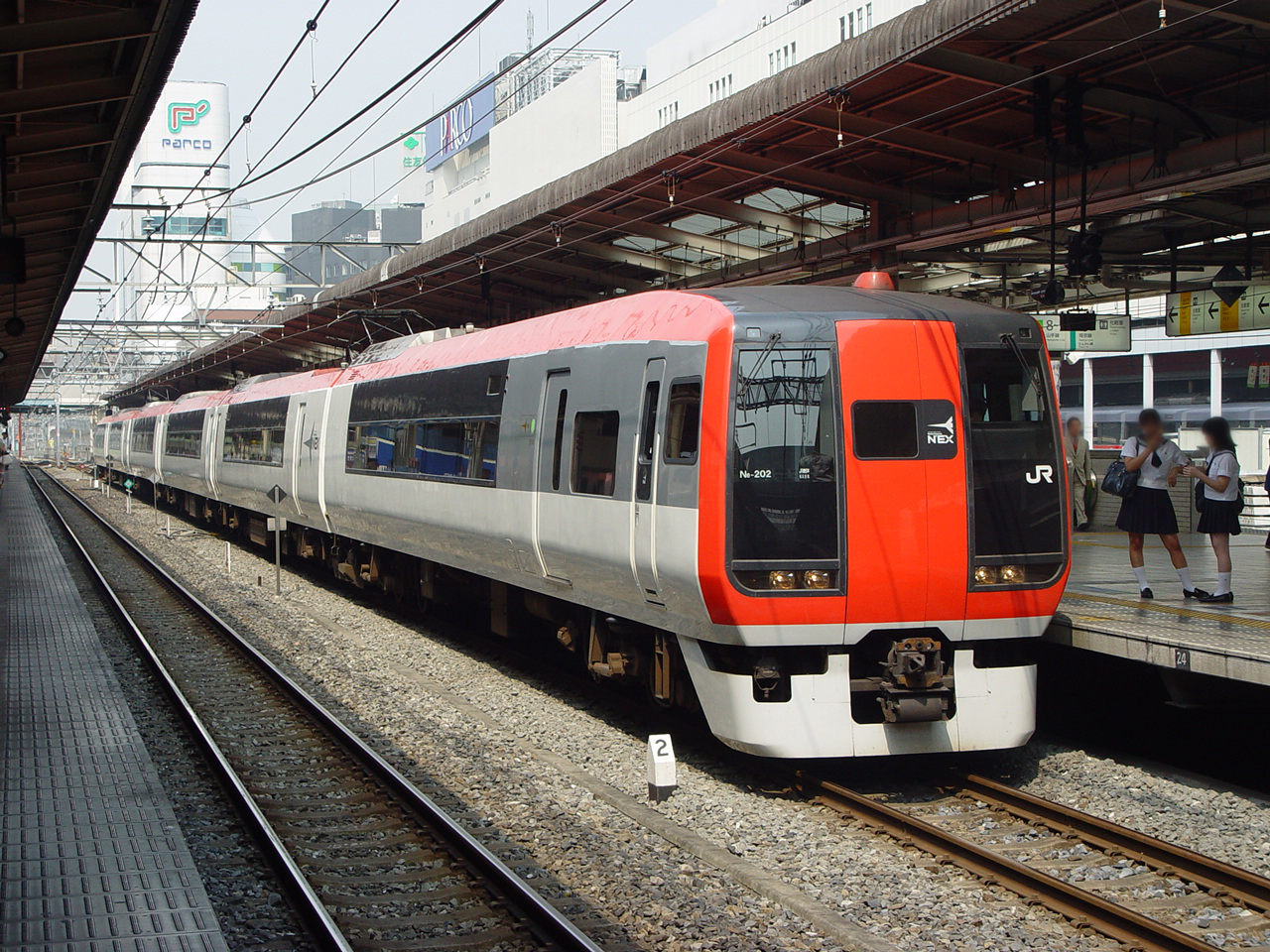
Six-car set Ne202 in August 2003

Car No.	1	2	3	4	5	6
Designation	M'c	M	T	M'	M1	Tsc
Numbering	KuMoHa 252-200	MoHa 253-200	SaHa 253-200	MoHa 252-200	MoHa 253-300	KuRo 253-200

Each MoHa 253 car was equipped with one PS26 lozenge-type pantograph.

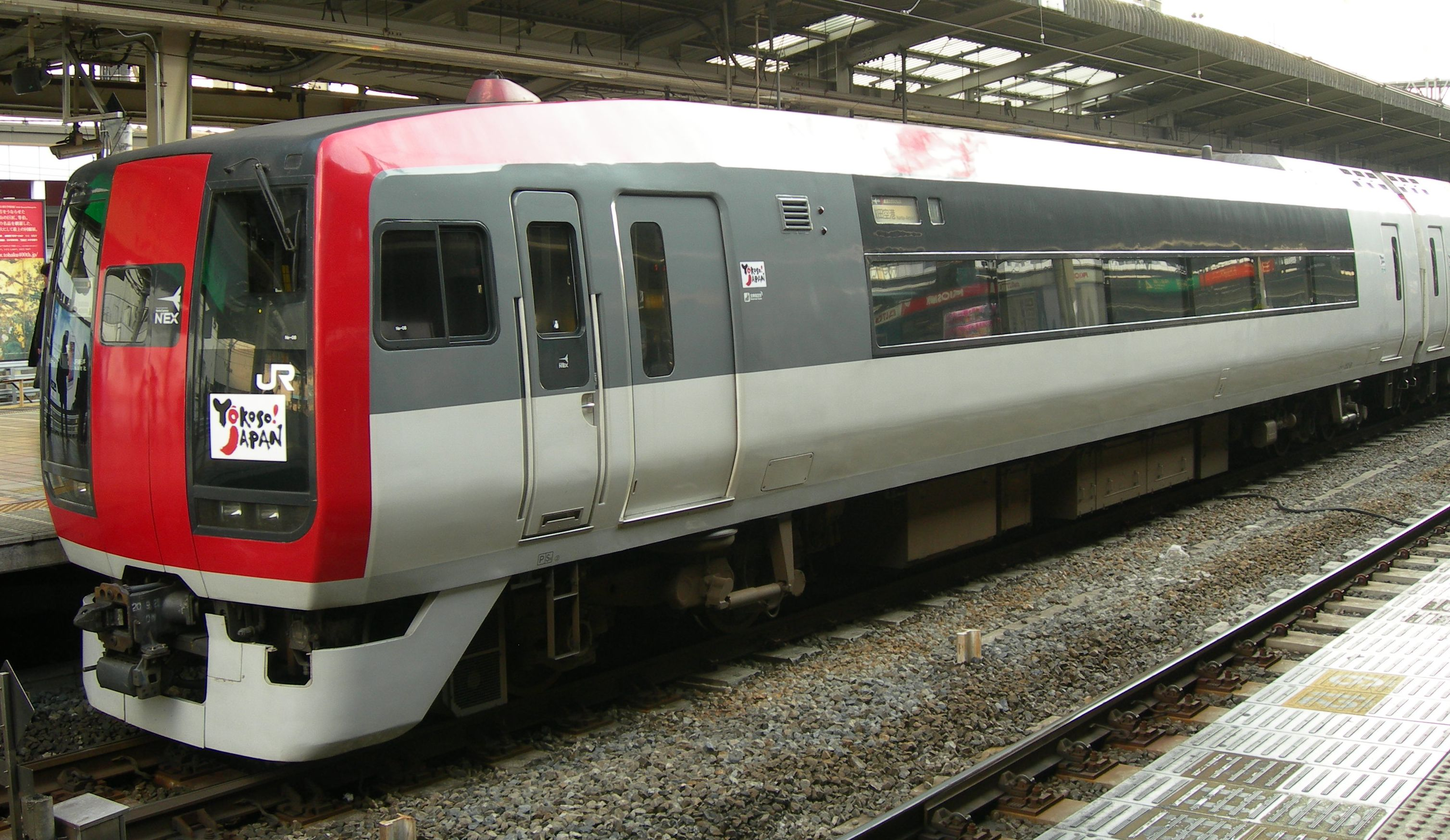
KuMoHa 252

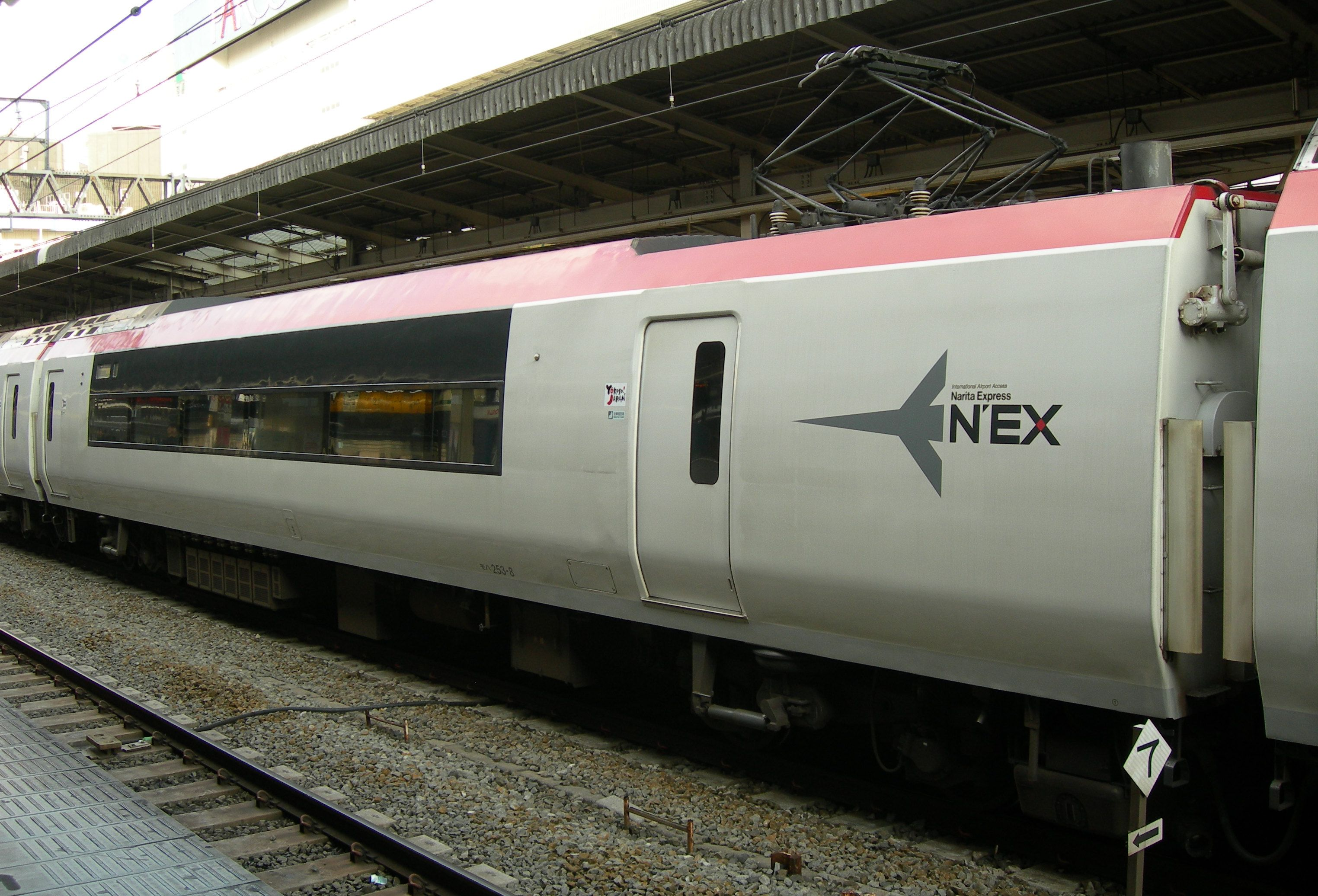
MoHa 253

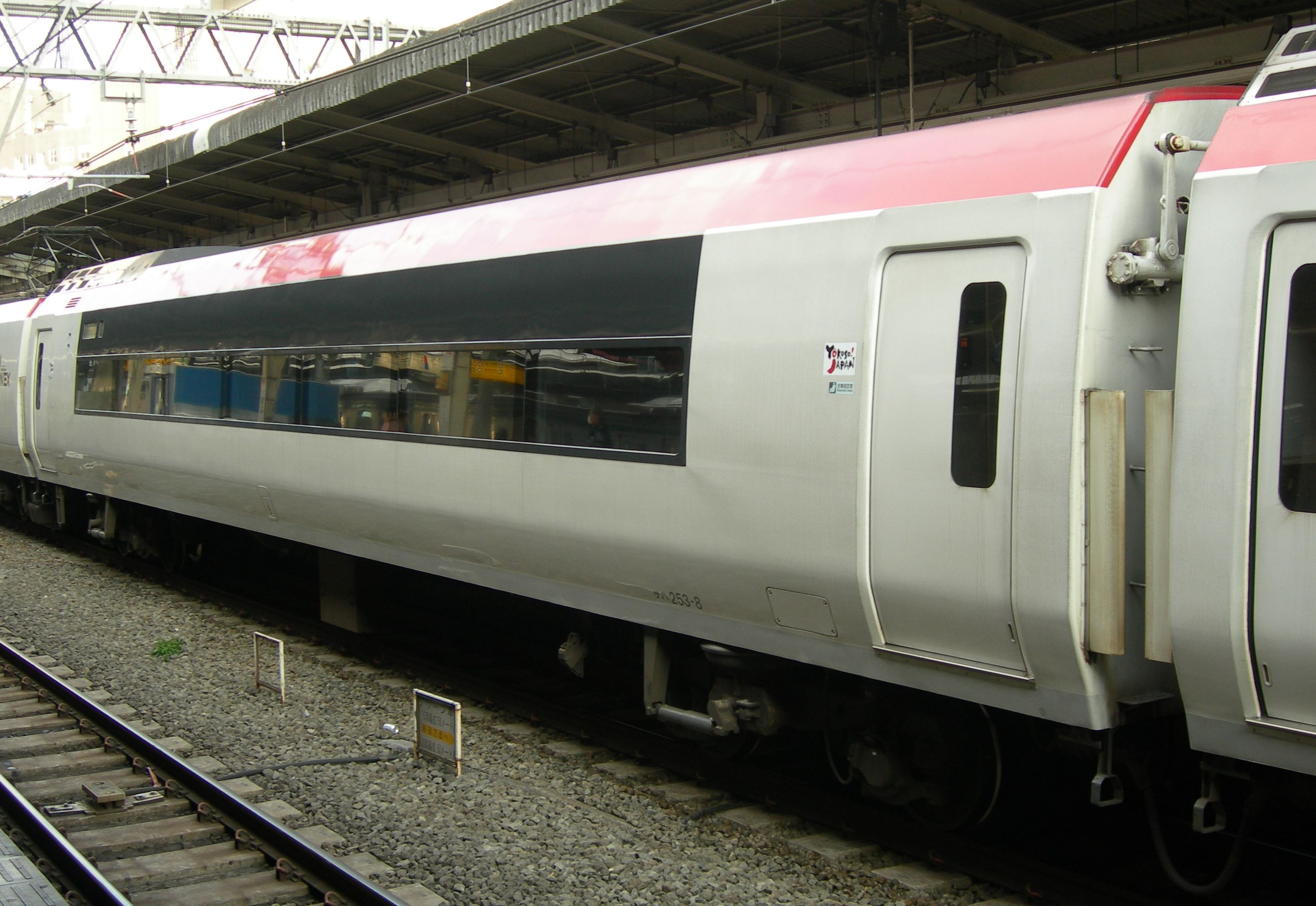
SaHa 253

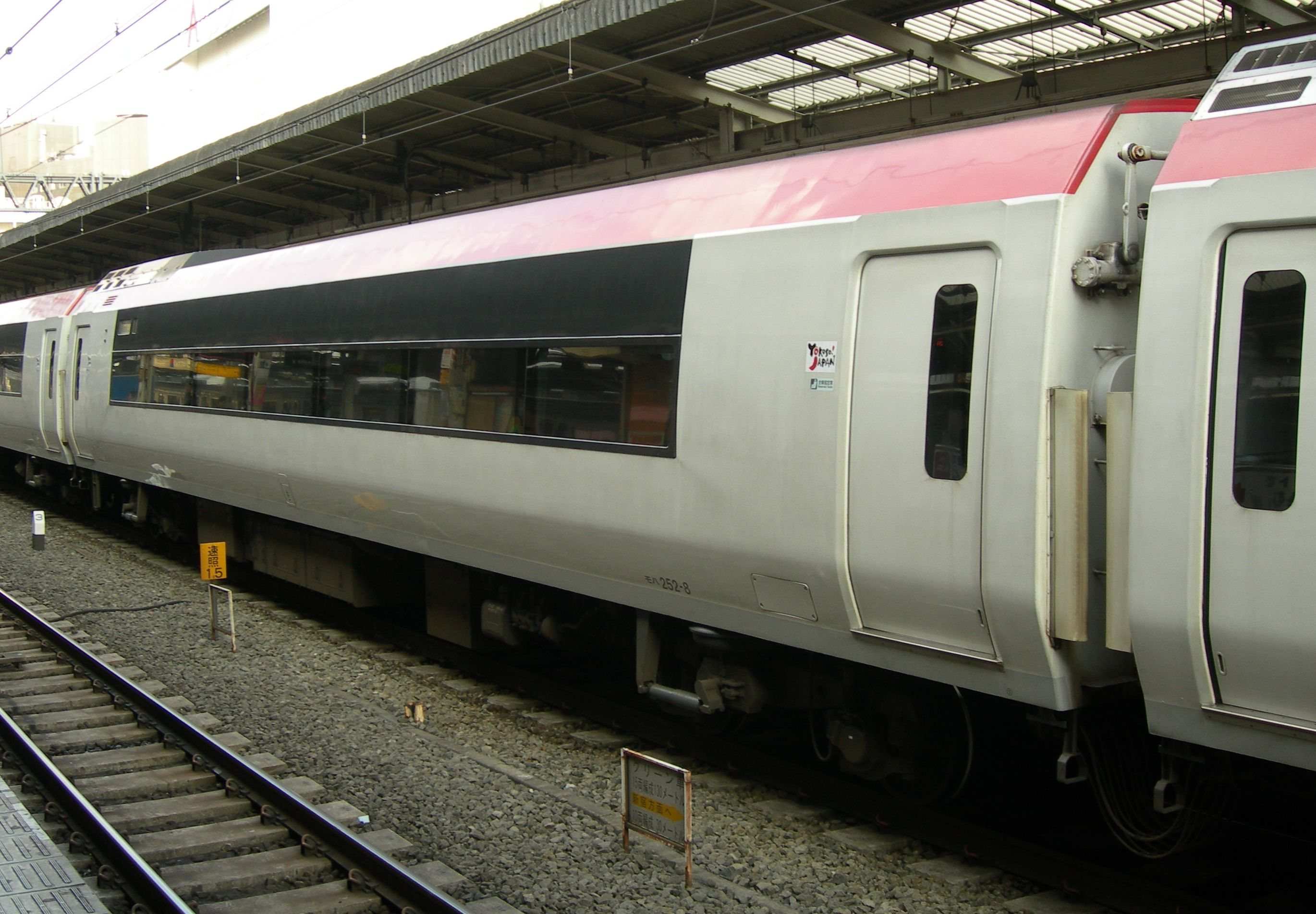
MoHa 252

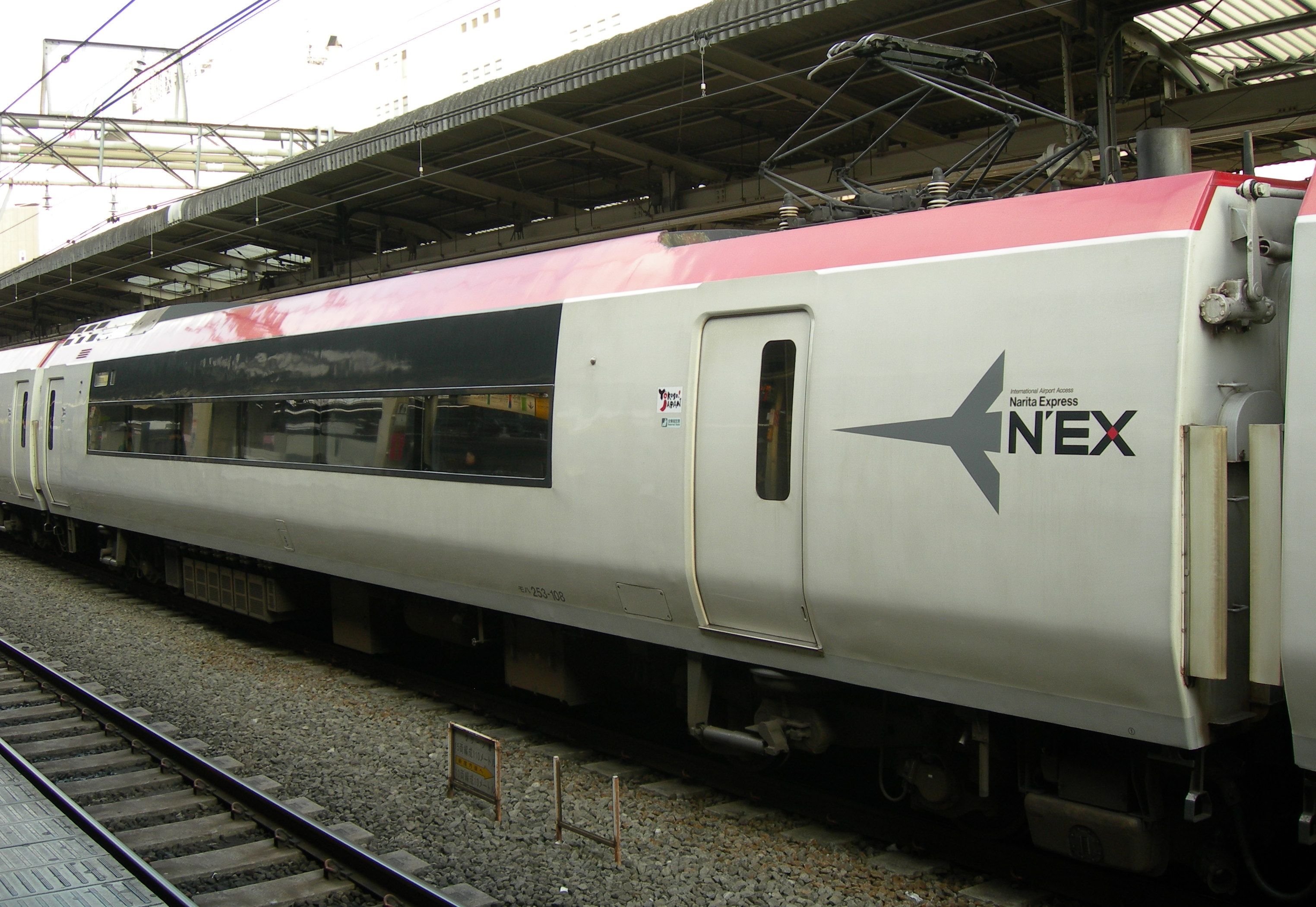
MoHa 253-100

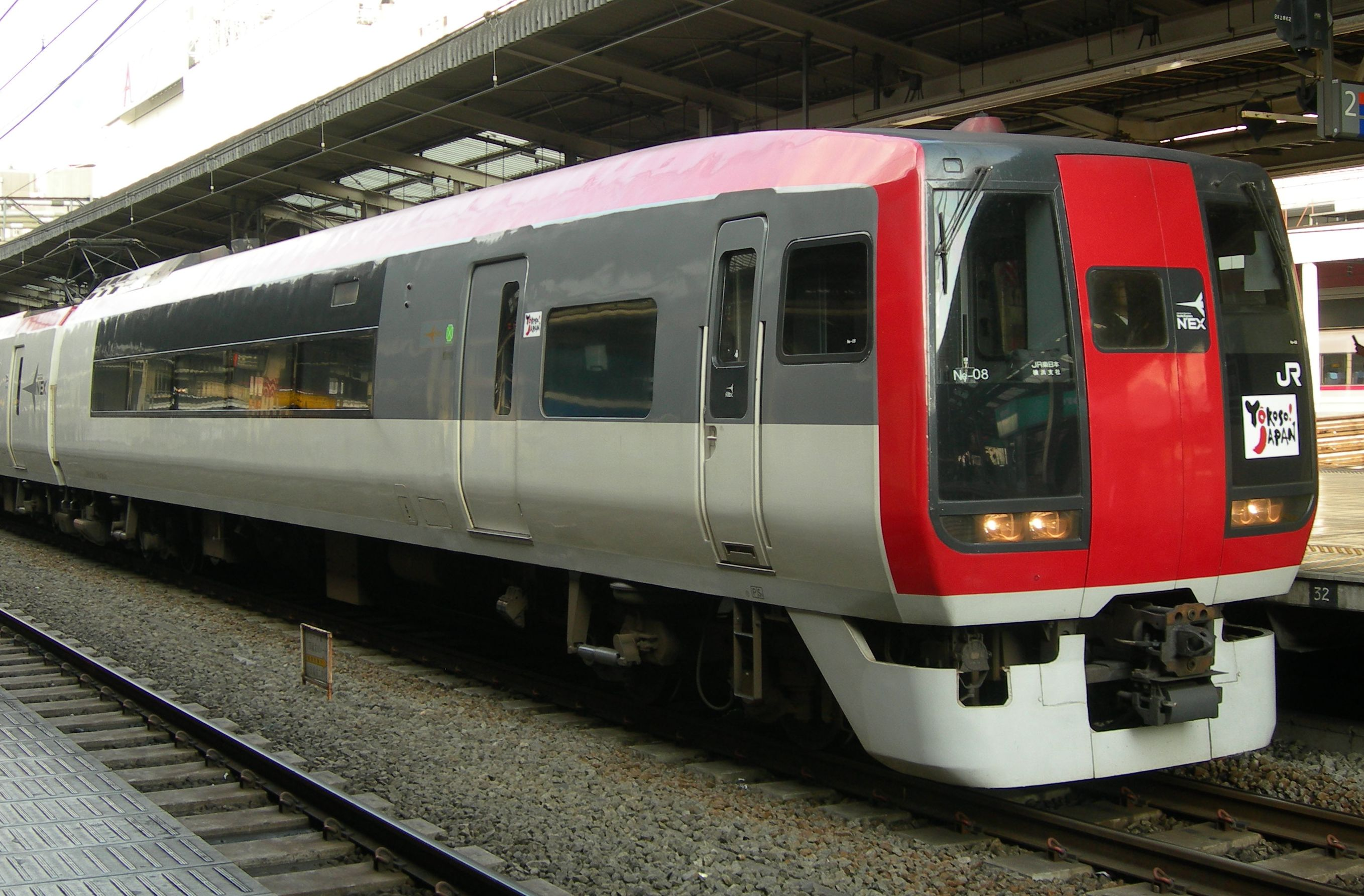
KuRo 253

== Interior ==
The standard-class seating arrangement used in the original 253 series sets was unusual for Japanese limited express trains in consisting of European-style fixed four-seat bays. The seats were later rearranged in a fixed unidirectional layout facing four-seat bays in the centre of each car between 2003 and 2004. The green (first class) cars in the original three-car sets were classified as KuRo 253 or KuRo 253-100. The KuRo 253 cars had ten rows of 1+1 seating at a seat pitch of 1,090 mm (43 in), with seats angled to face the windows, together with one 4-person compartment. The KuRo 253-100 cars had eight rows of seats arranged in a mixture of 2+1 and 1+1 at a seat pitch of 1,340 mm (53 in), together with one 4-person compartment.

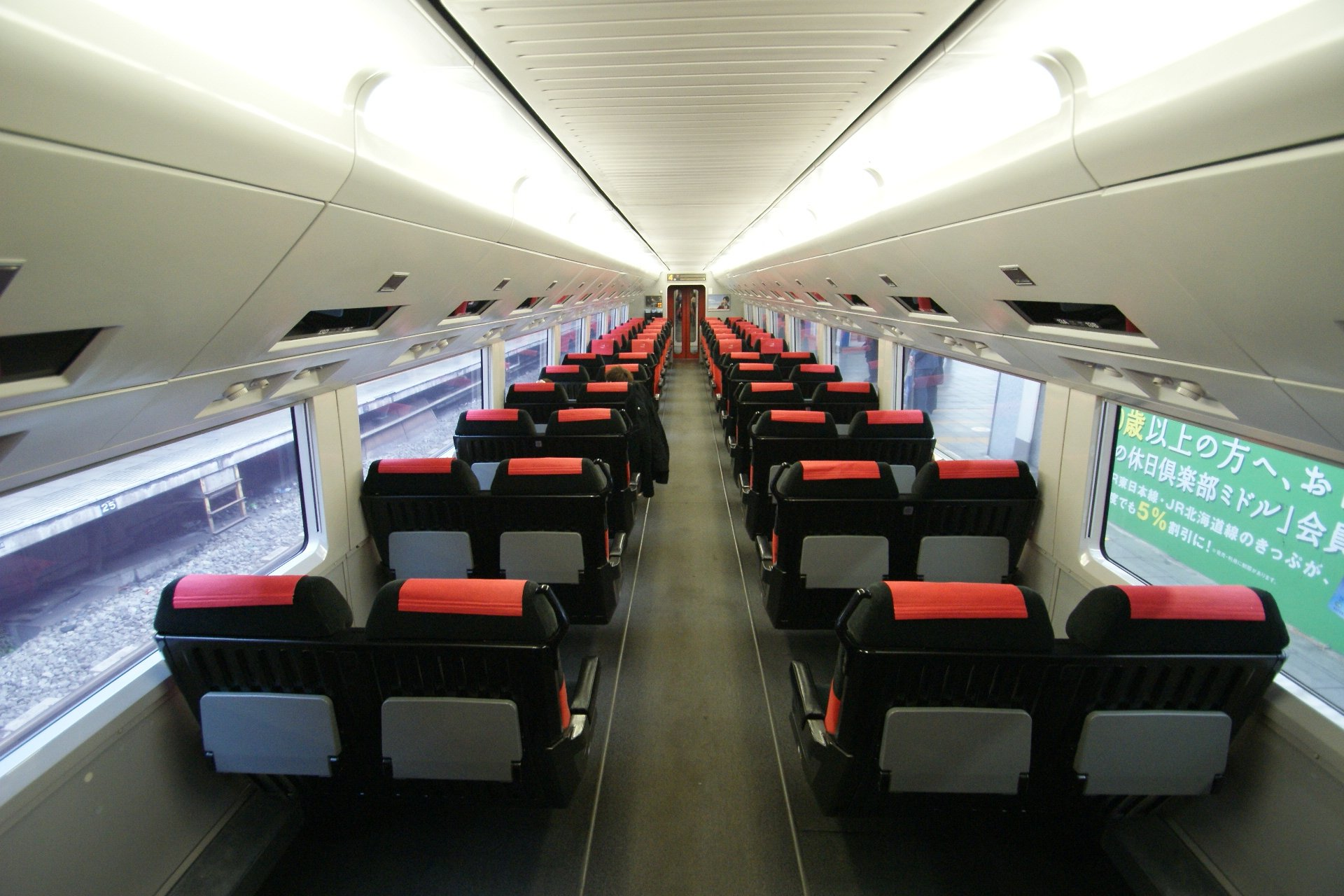
General view of standard-class saloon with fixed unidirectional seating

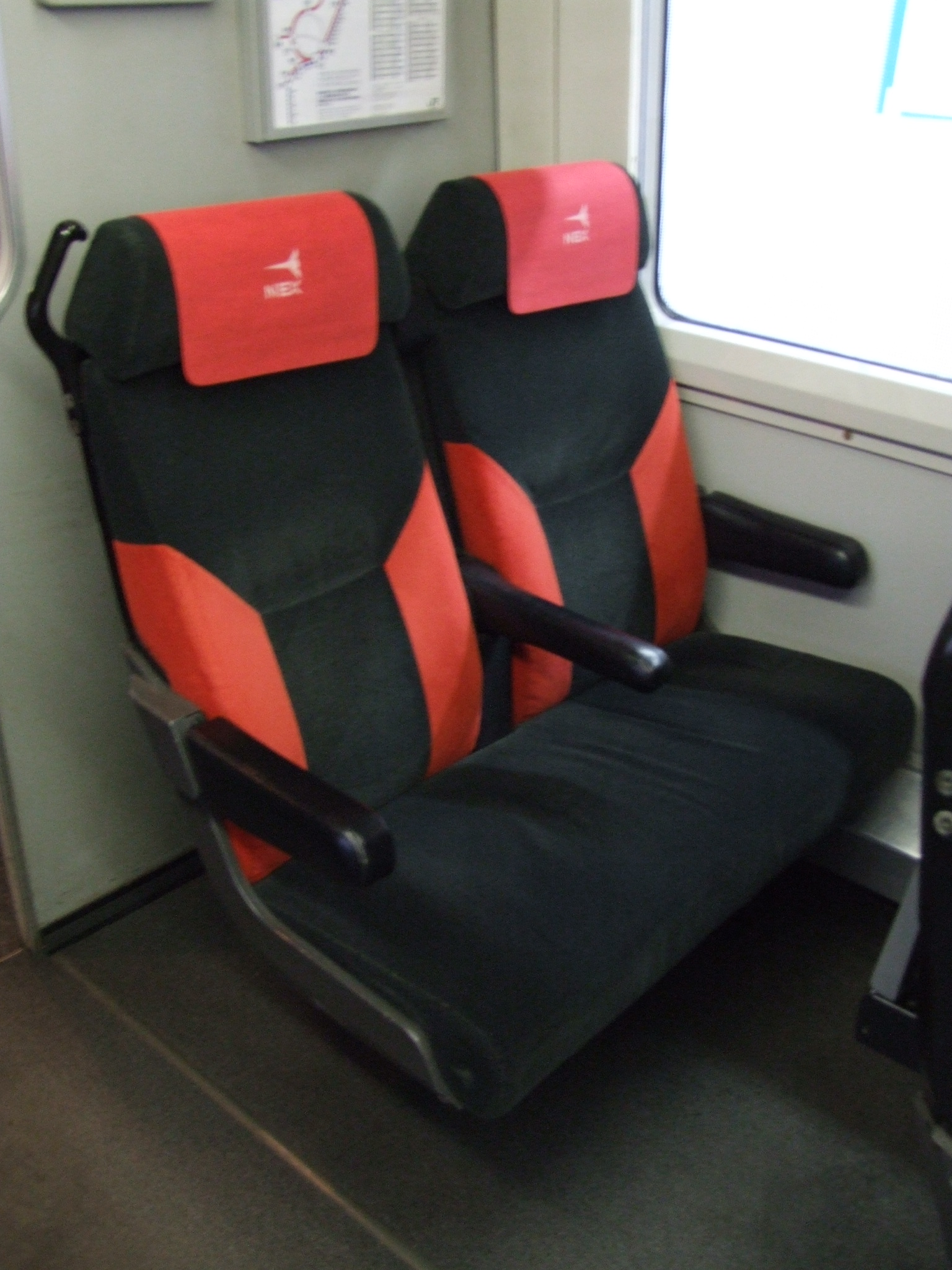
Standard-class fixed seating

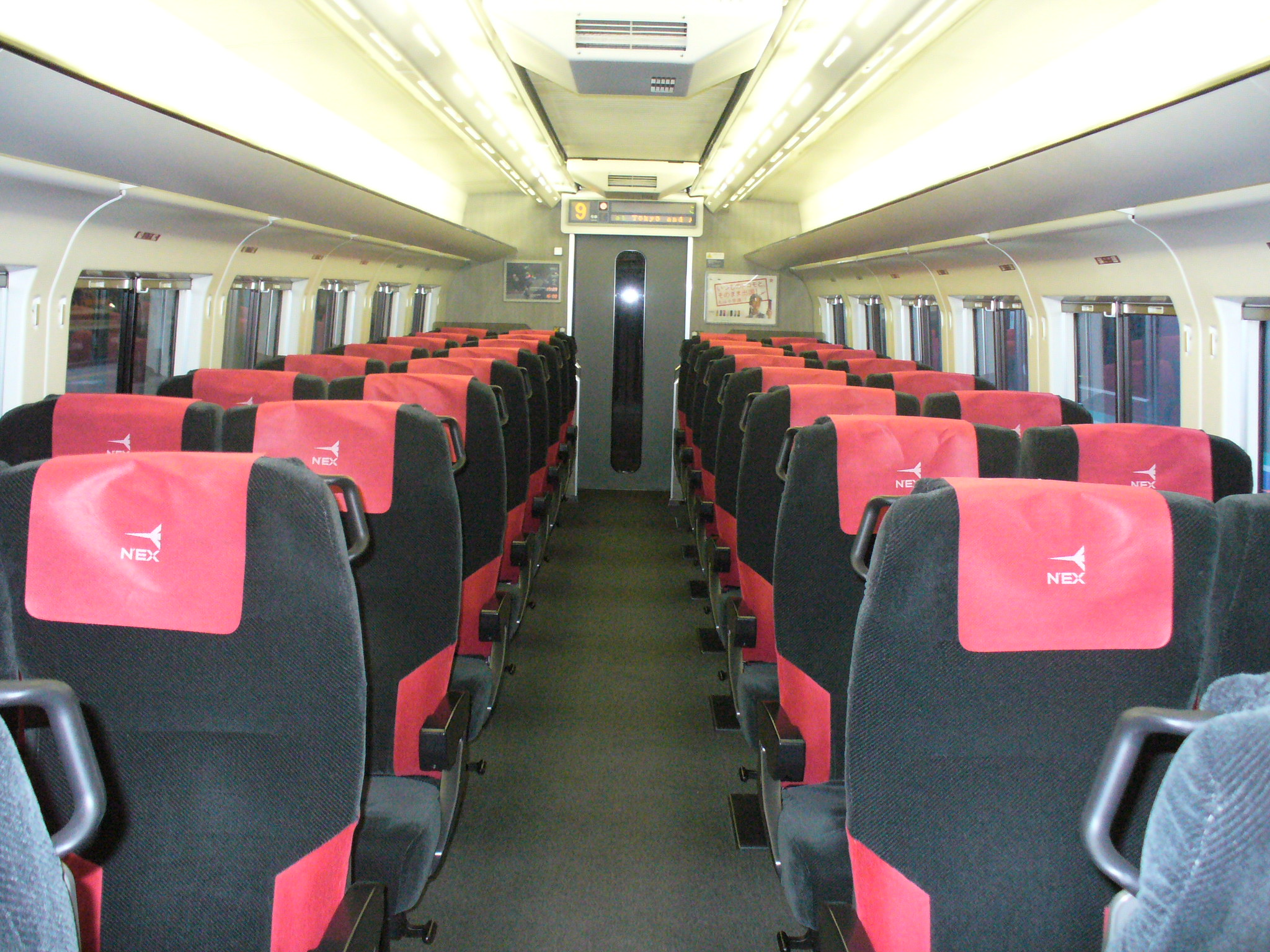
Standard-class rotating seating

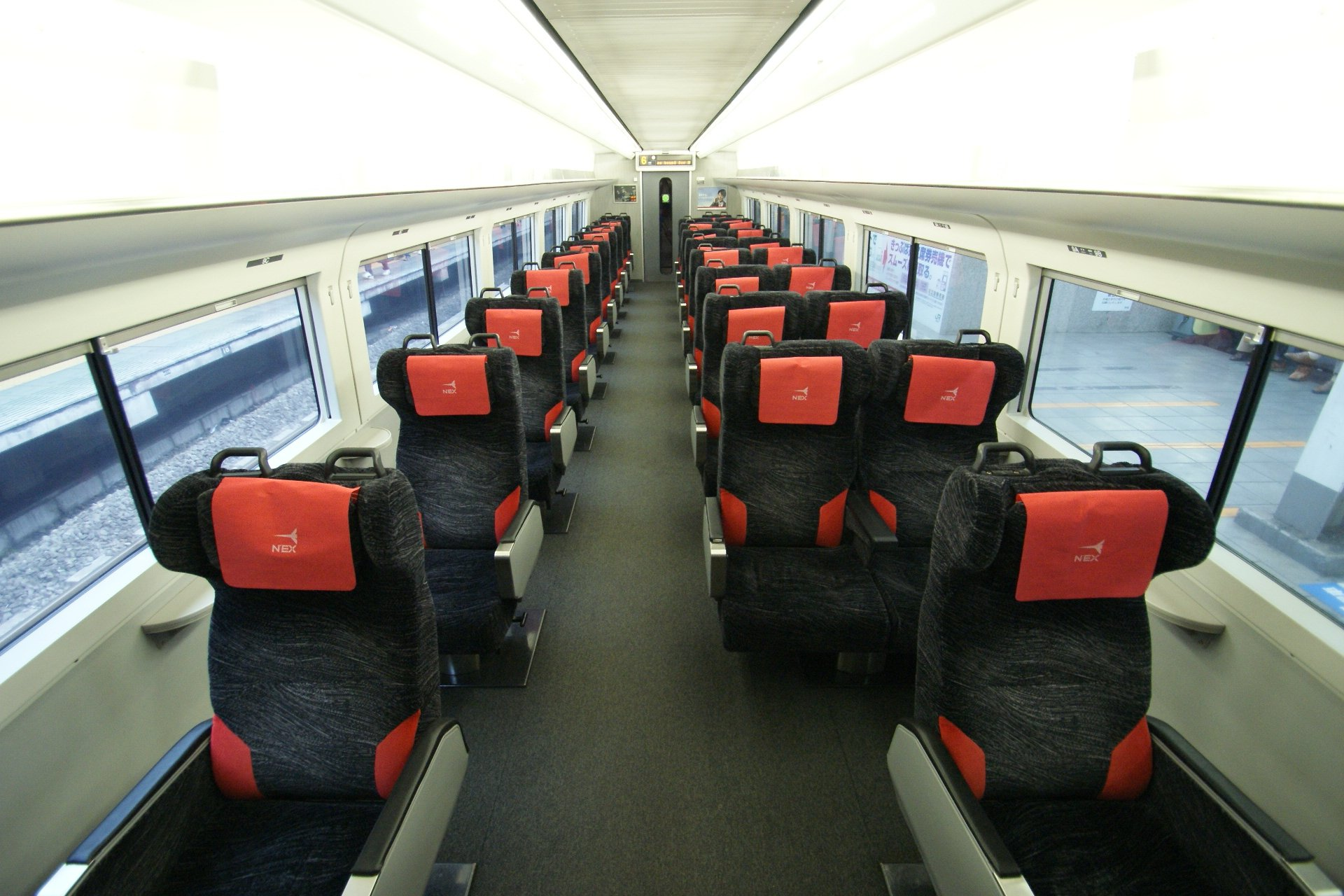
General view of Green-class saloon

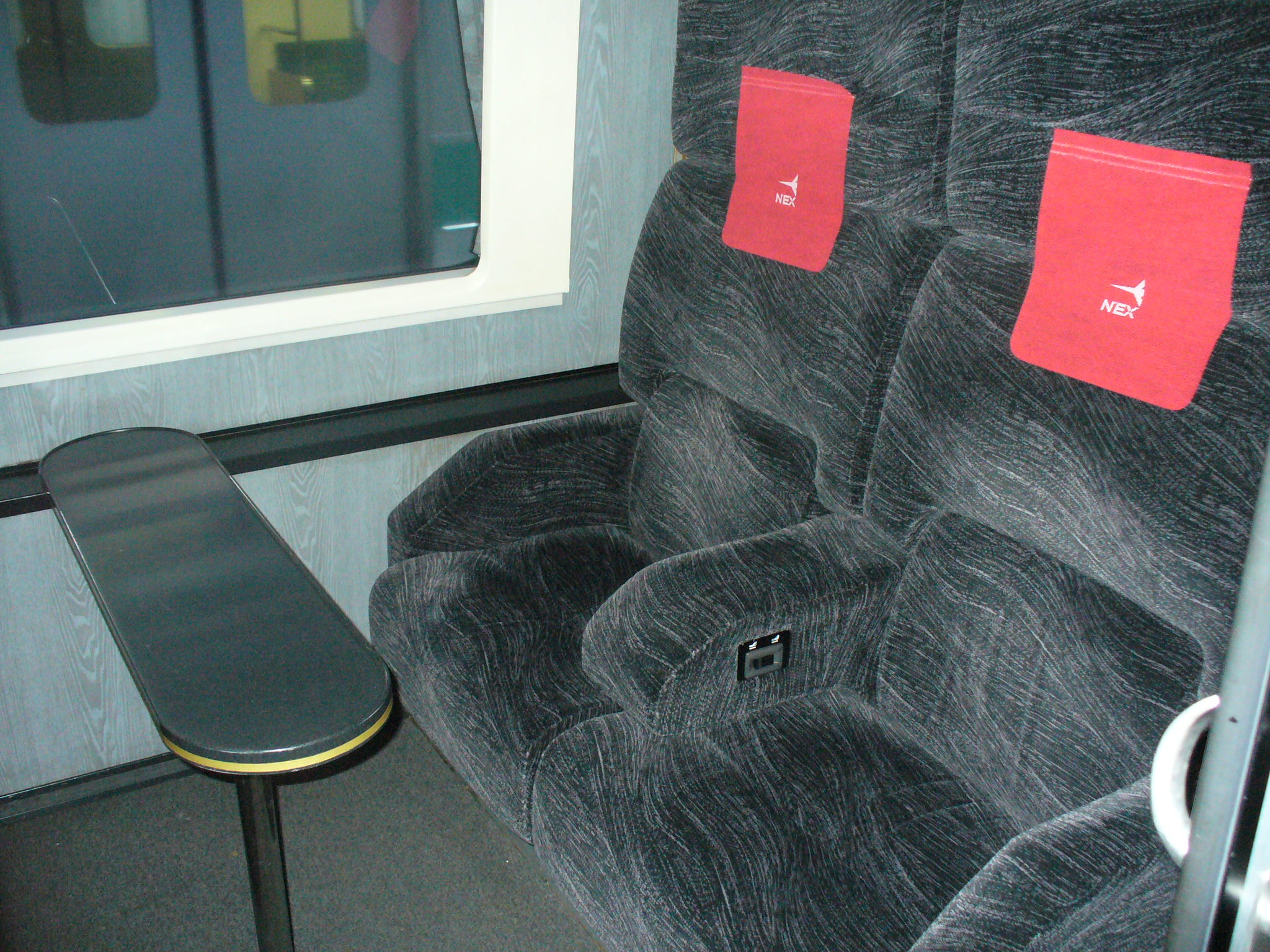
Green-class compartment in November 2007

== Retirement ==
The 253 series trains were gradually replaced on Narita Express services from October 2009 by new E259 series EMUs, with the last trains operating until 30 June 2010. Most trains were subsequently withdrawn and scrapped, but two six-car sets, Ne201 and Ne202, were converted in late 2010 to become 253-1000 series (see below), and two three-car sets, Ne107 and Ne108, were sold to the Nagano Electric Railway (see below).

== 253-1000 series ==
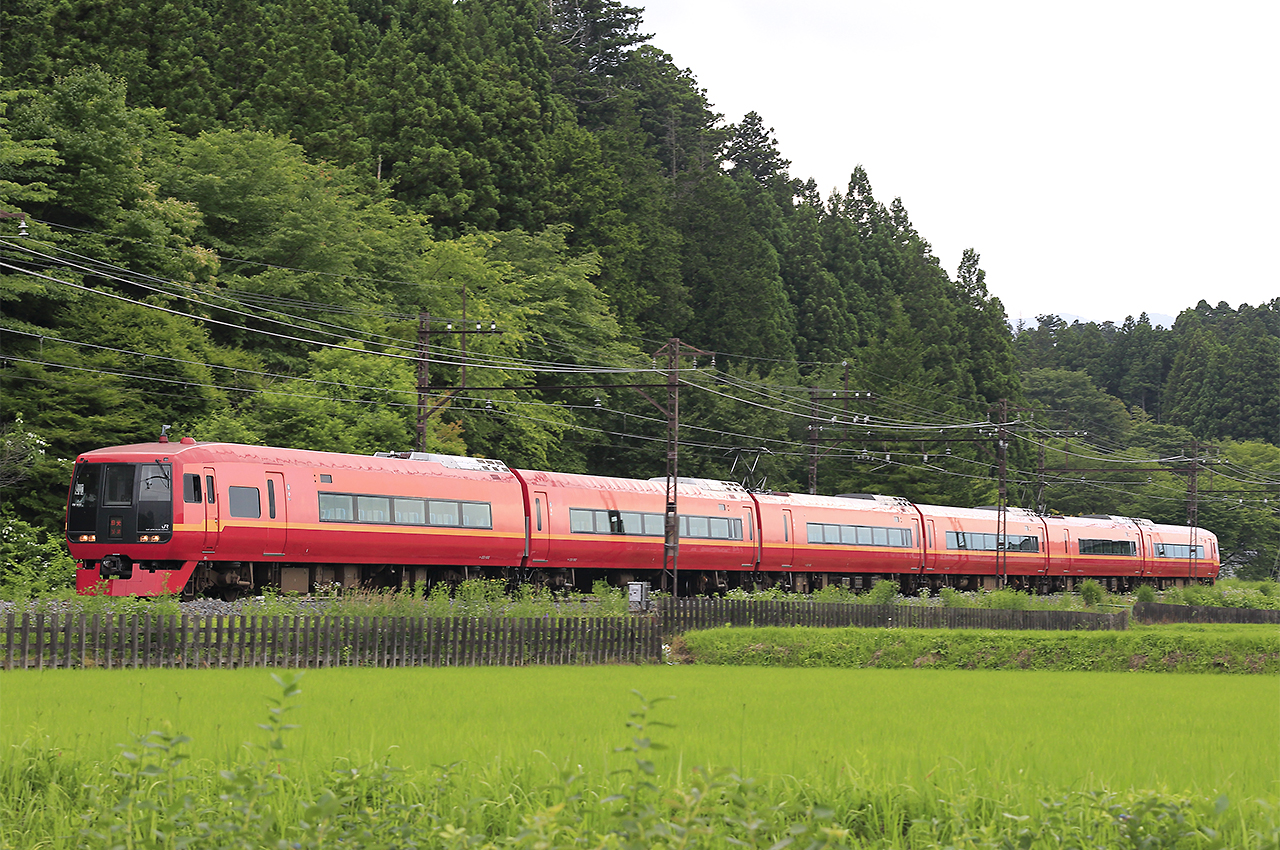
A 253-1000 series set on a Nikko service in June 2017

The two newest-built sets, Ne201 and Ne202, underwent extensive refurbishment at JR East's Omiya Works and Tokyu Car Corporation's Yokohama factory to become 253-1000 series sets OM-N1 and OM-N2 for use on Nikkō and Kinugawa limited express services jointly operated with Tobu Railway from 4 June 2011, replacing the 485 series and 189 series EMUs currently used. Refurbishment includes entirely new interiors with monoclass seating configured with seat pitch increased from 1,020 mm to 1,100 mm, as well as replacement of main equipment. The total seating capacity for each six-car set is 290. Onboard announcements and passenger information displays are in four languages, Japanese, English, Chinese, and Korean.

On 19 December 2025, JR East announced that the 253‑1000 series fleet would receive a refreshed livery of blue and yellow to commemorate the 20th anniversary of Tobu through services. The first train to carry the new livery is scheduled to return to service in June 2026.

=== Formation ===
The 253-1000 series sets are formed as follows.

Car No.	1	2	3	4	5	6
Designation	M'c	M2	M'	M3	T	Tc
Numbering	KuMoHa 252-1000	MoHa 253-1000	MoHa 252-1000	MoHa 253-1100	SaHa 253-1000	KuHa 253-1000
Capacity	48	42	56	48	56	40
Weight (t)	39.6	40.2	36.6	39.9	29.1	34.3

The M2 and M3 cars are each fitted with one PS26A lozenge-type pantograph.

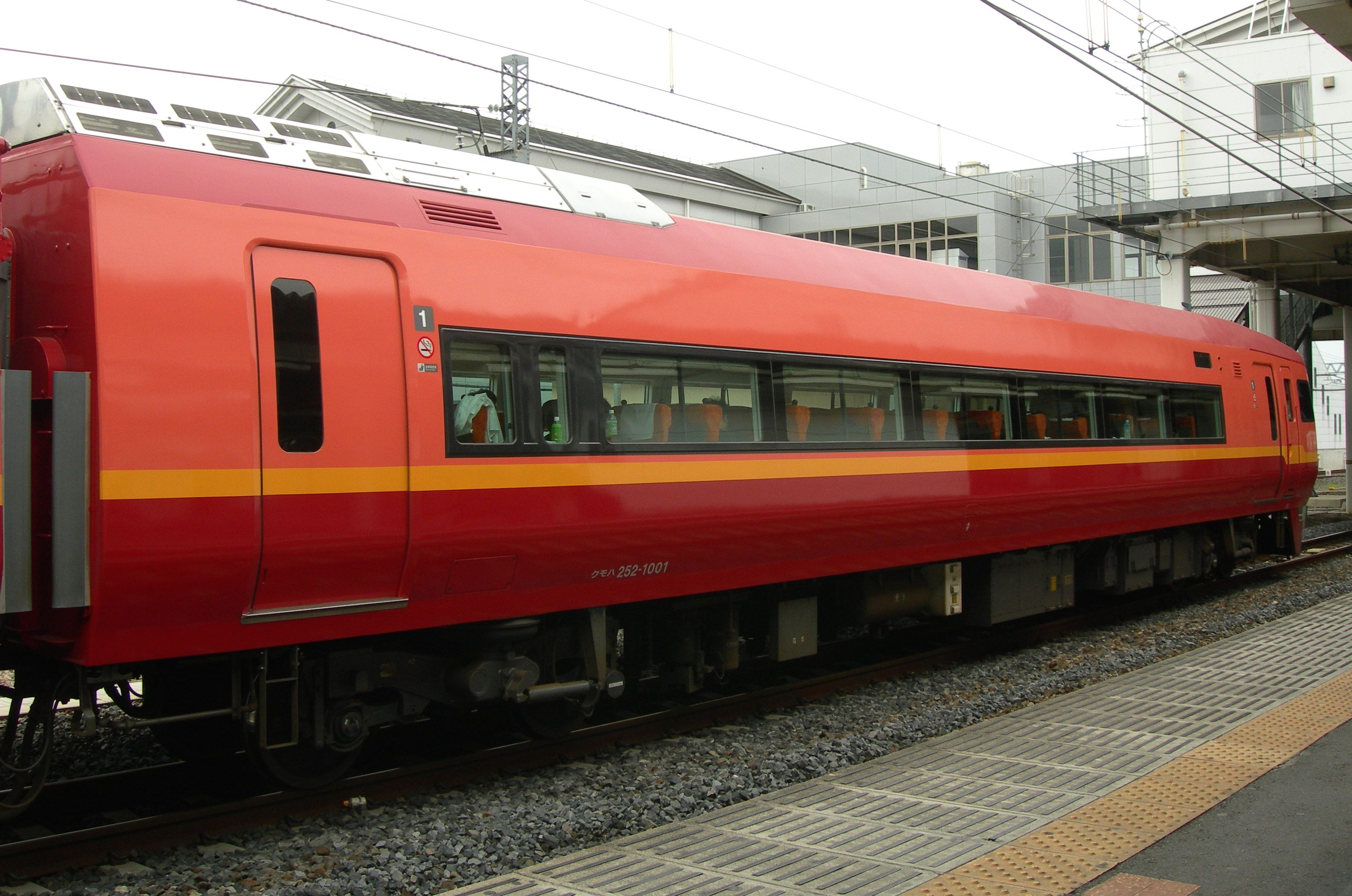
KuMoHa 252-1000

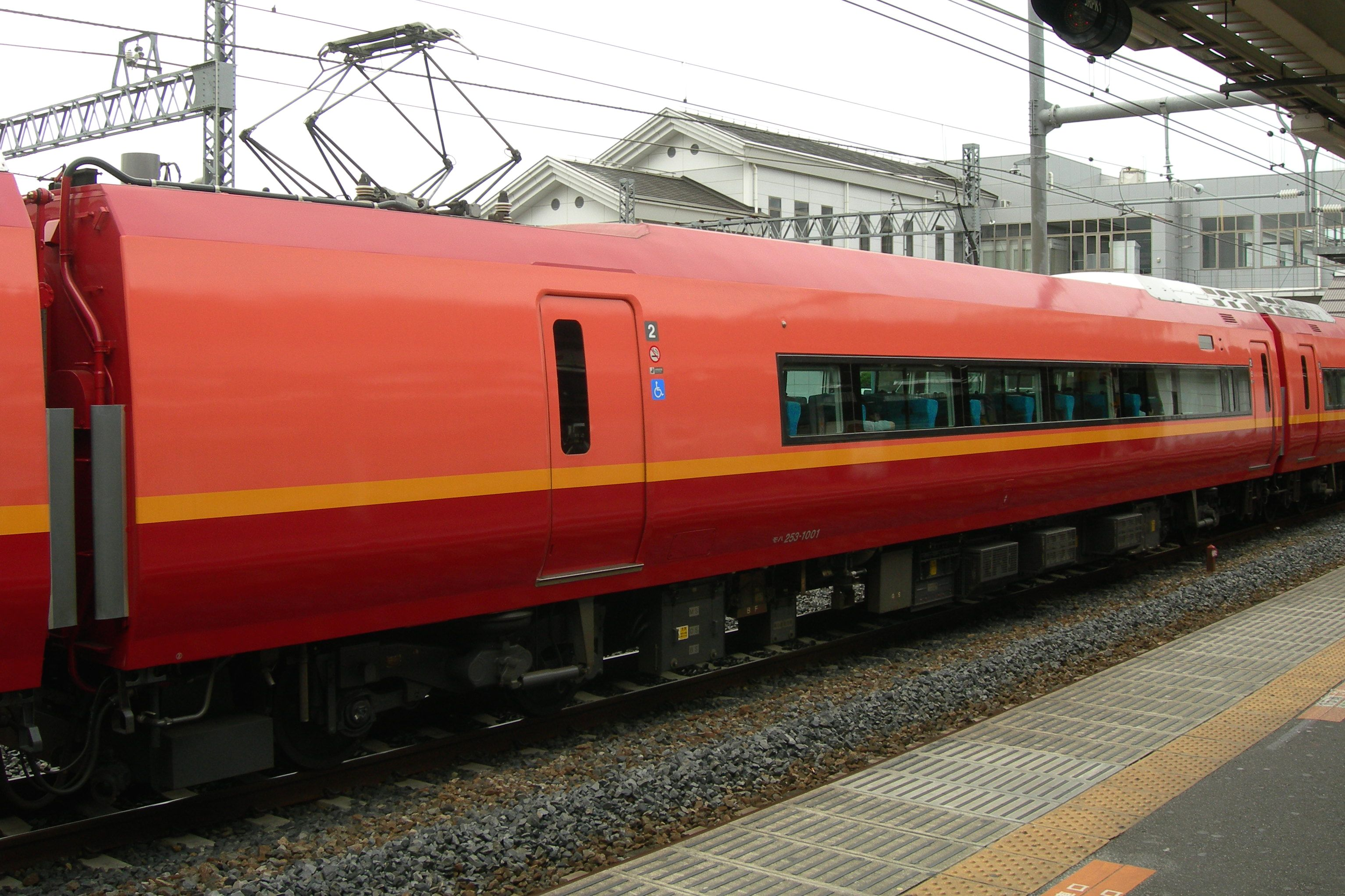
MoHa 253-1000

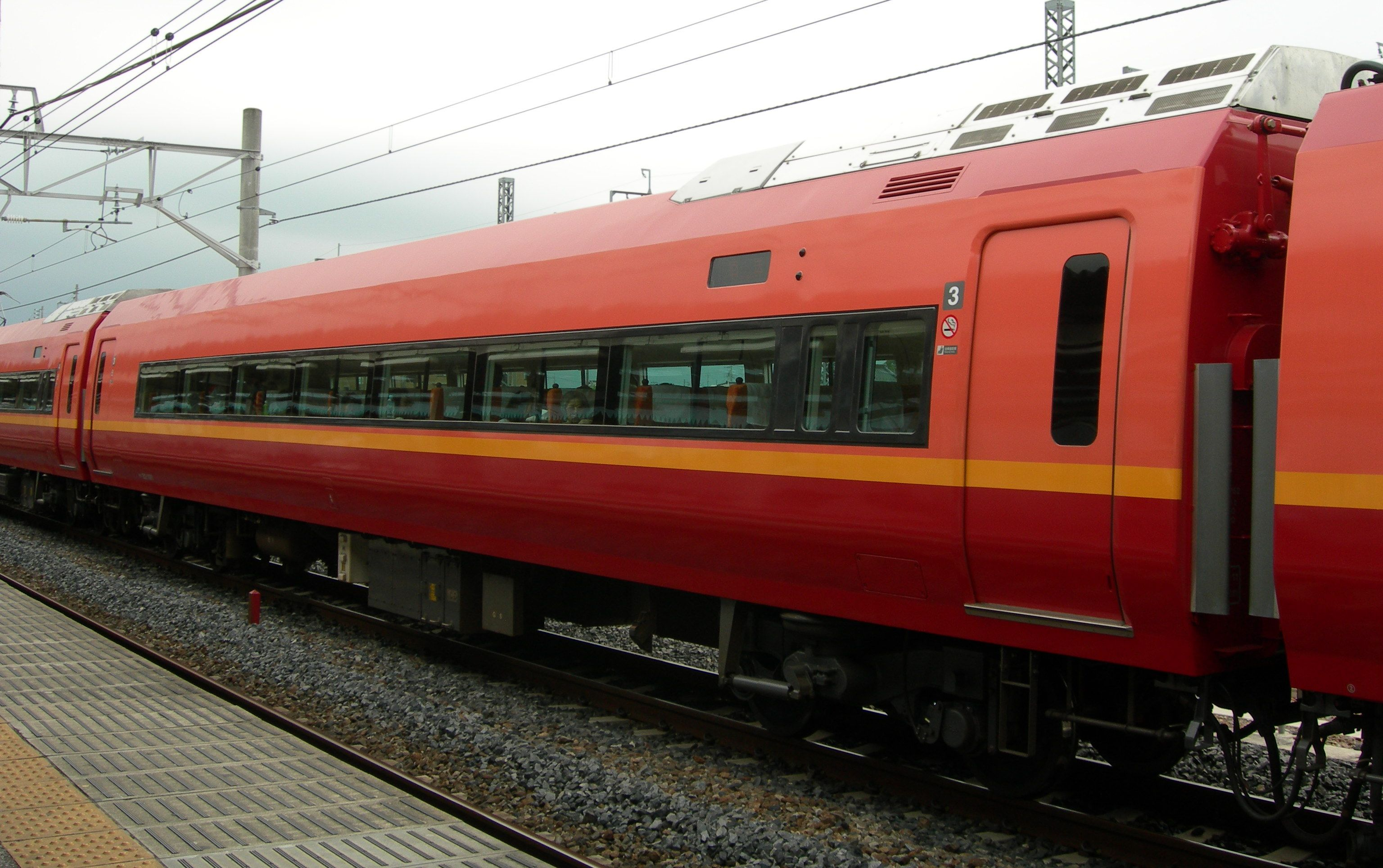
MoHa 252-1000

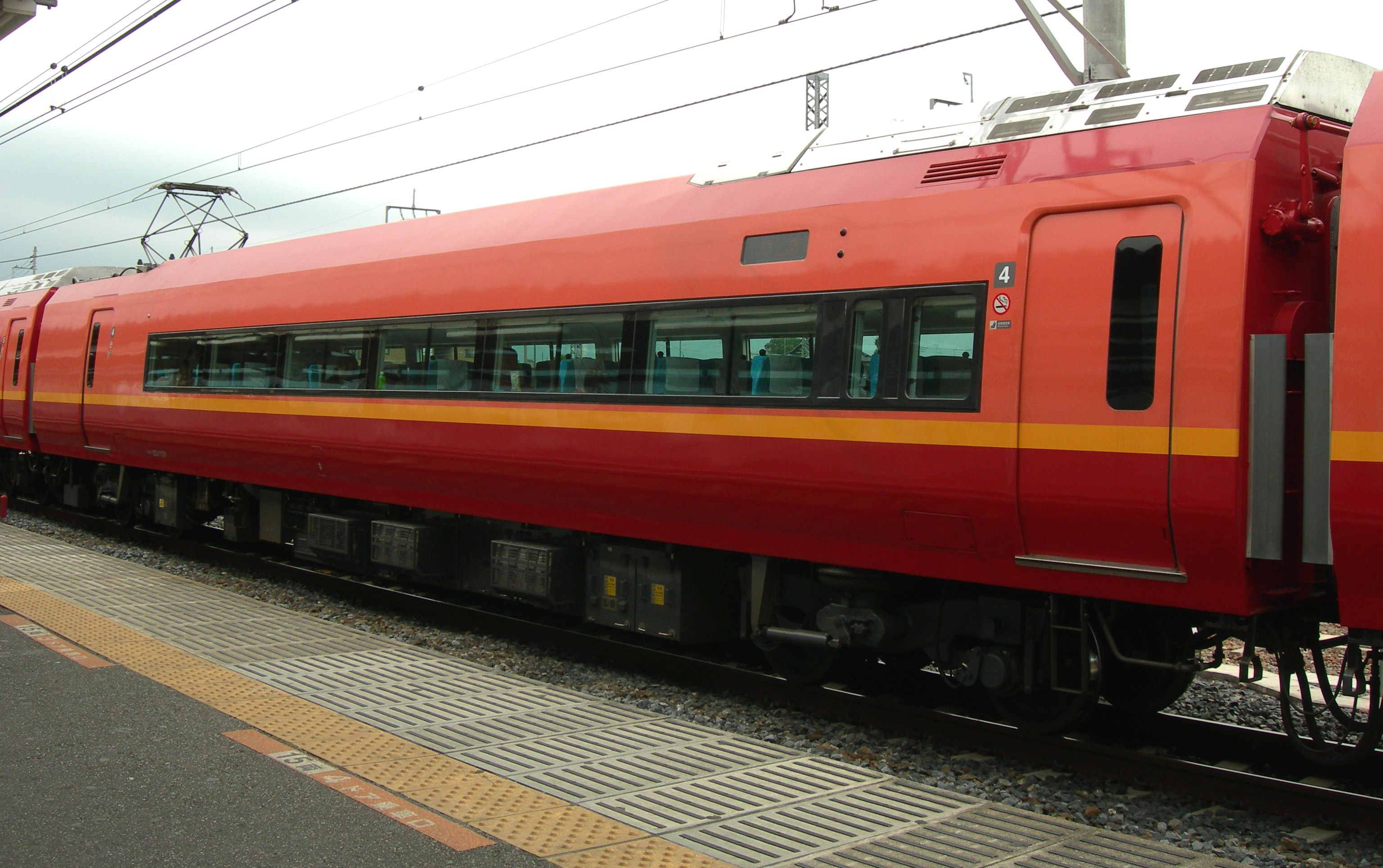
MoHa 253-1100

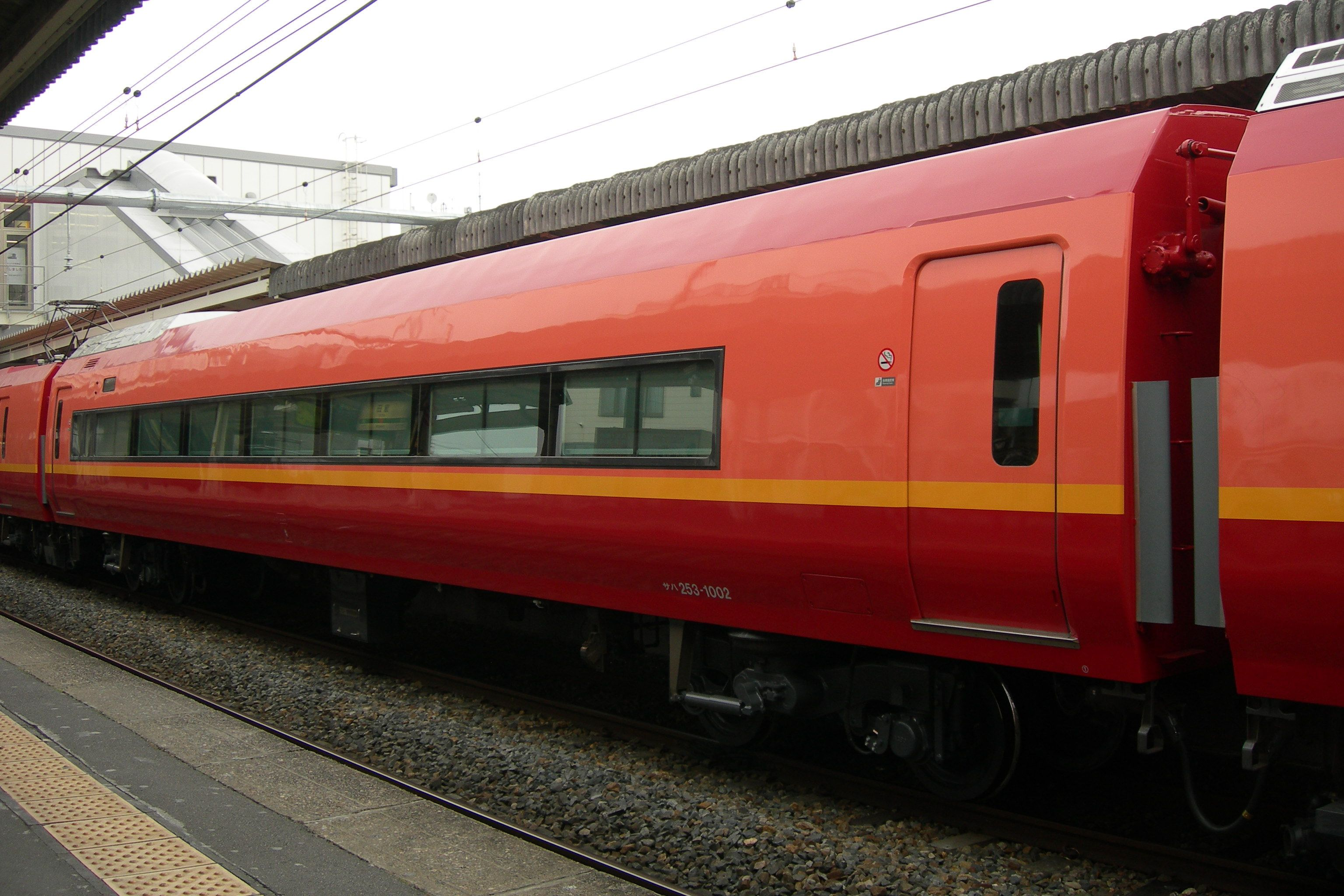
SaHa 253-1000

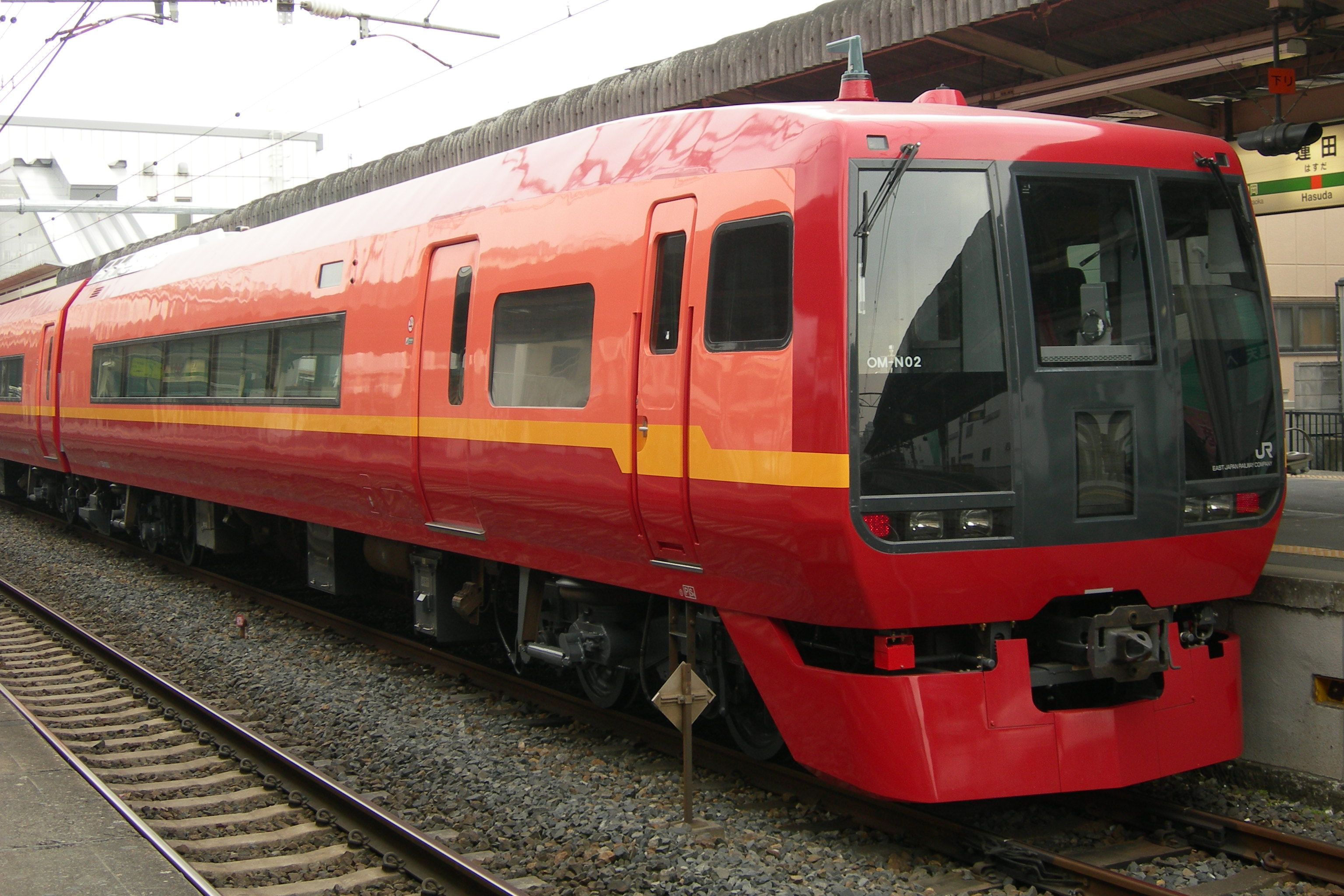
KuHa 253-1000

=== Interior ===
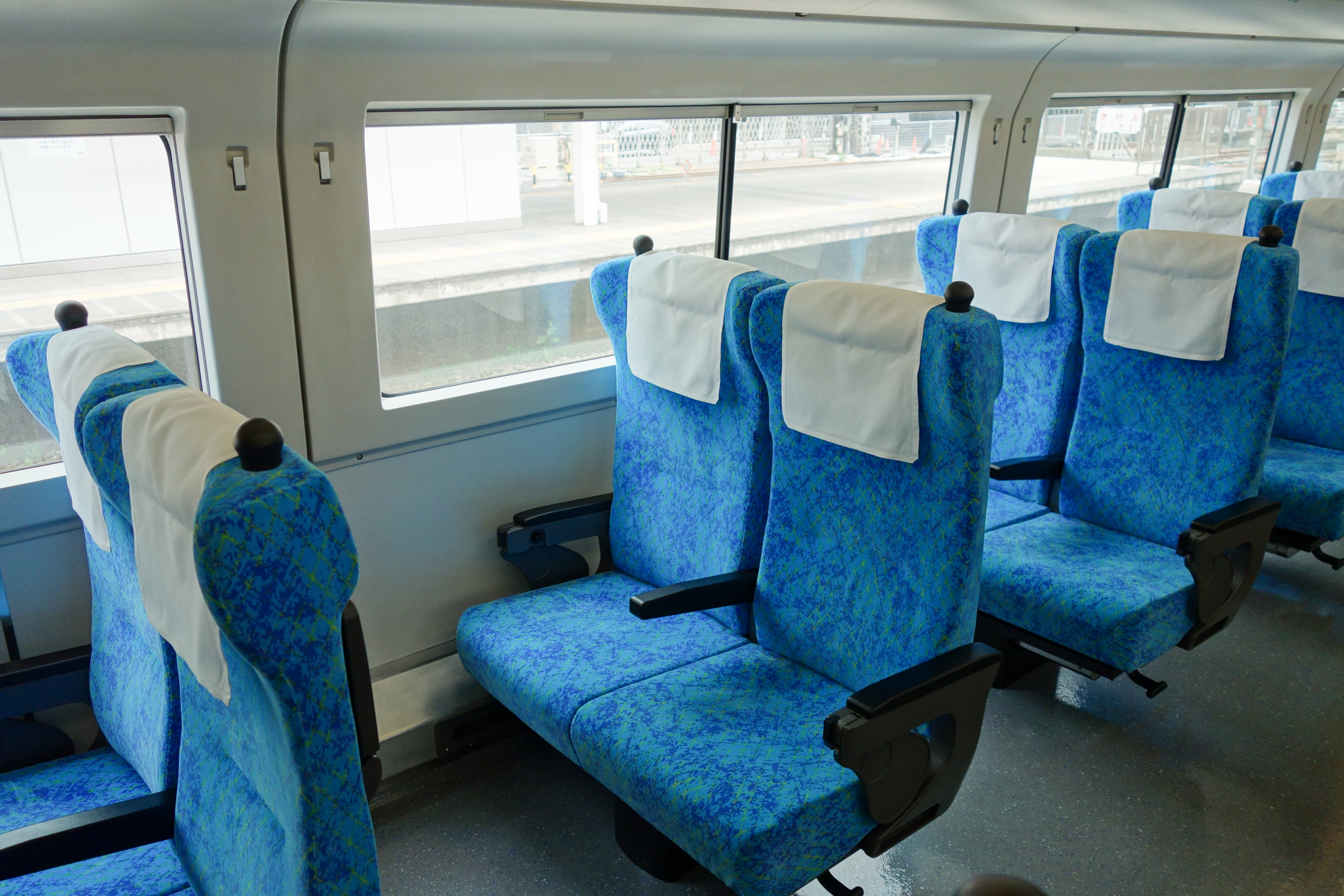
The interior of car 6 in June 2013

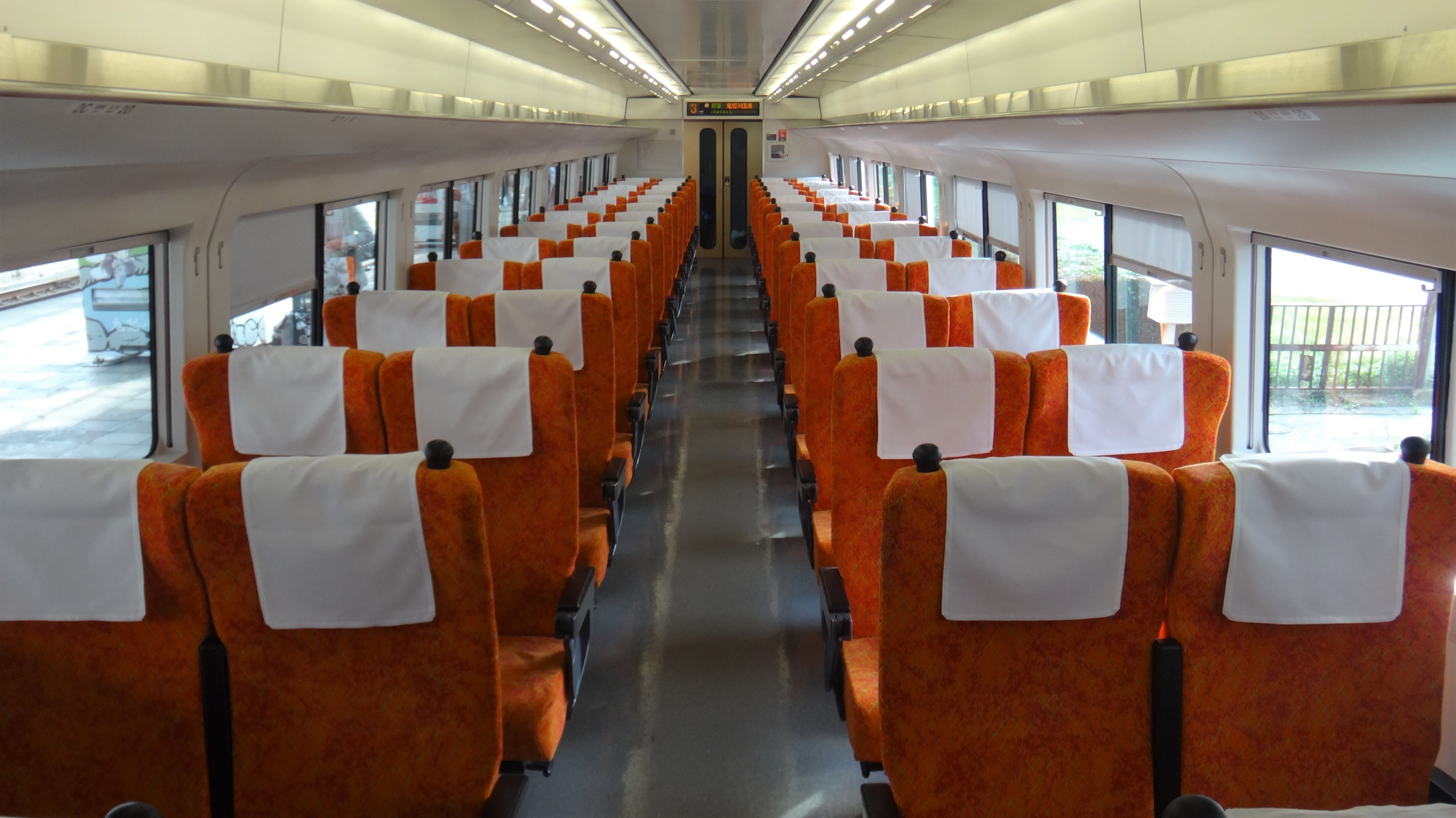
The interior of car 3 in September 2016

== Resale ==
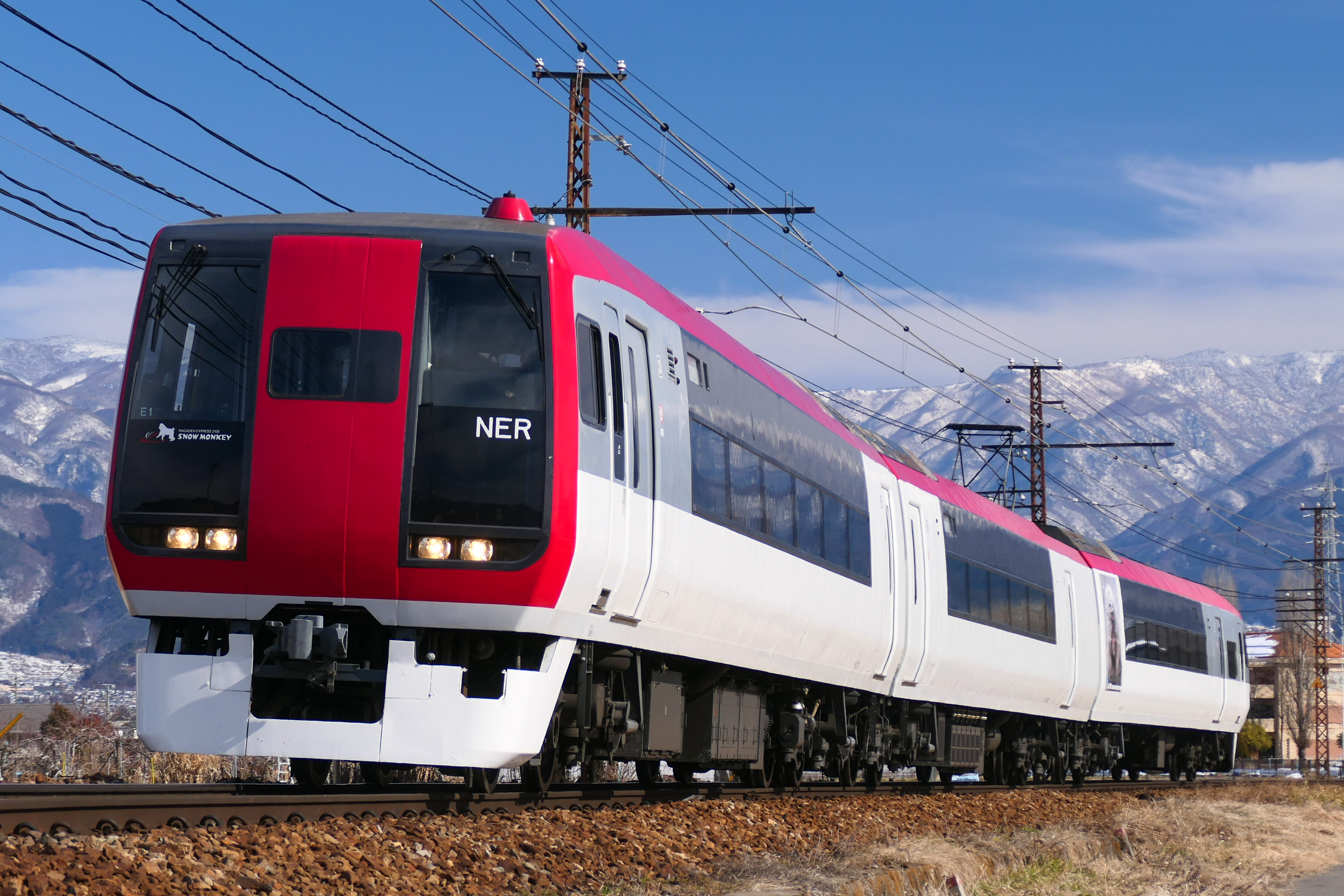
Nagano Electric Railway 2100 series in February 2022

Two three-car sets, Ne107 and Ne108, were sold to the Nagano Electric Railway for use on new Snow Monkey limited express services. The two sets, reclassified as 2100 series, entered service from February 2011 after modifications to allow wanman driver only operation.

== Other appearances ==
The 253 series was featured in the train simulator Densha de Go! Final also in Densha De Go! Pocket Chuo line which runs on a (real-life) once-daily Narita Express service on the Chūō Main Line from Takao Station to Shinjuku Station.
