= Nagano Electric Railway 2100 series =

Japanese train type

Nagaden 2100 series
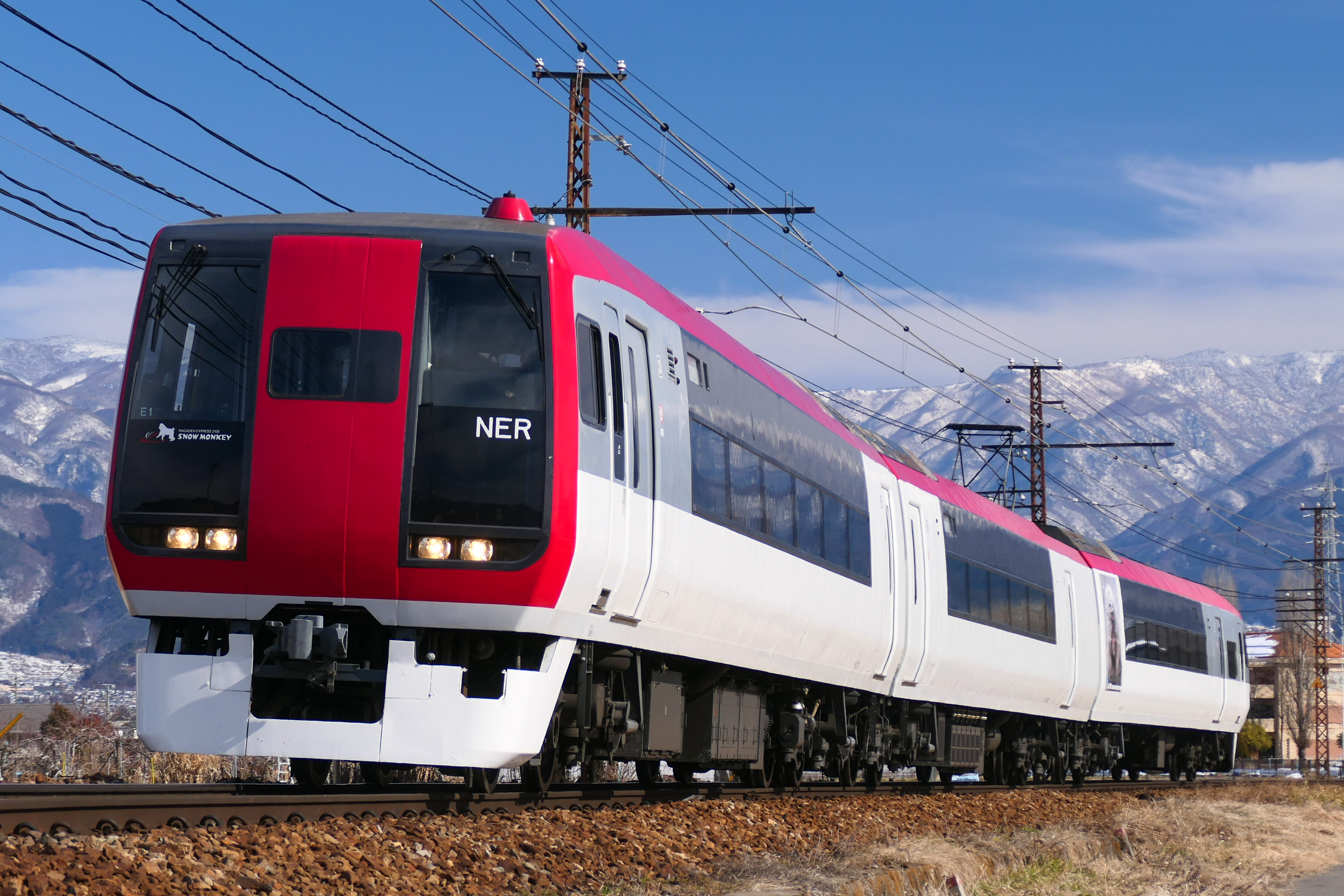
- Set E1, February 2022
- In service: 2011–present
- Replaced: 2000 series
- Entered service: February 2011
- Refurbished: 2010
- Number built: 6 vehicles (2 sets)
- Number in service: 6 vehicles (2 sets)
- Formation: 3 cars per trainset
- Fleet numbers: E1–E2
- Operators: Nagano Electric Railway

Specifications
- Car body construction: Steel
- Electric system(s): 1,500 V DC
- Current collection: Overhead catenary
- Bogies: DT56BN (motored), TR241CN (trailer)
- Safety system(s): ATS
- Track gauge: 1,067 mm (3 ft 6 in)

The Nagano Electric Railway 2100 series (長野電鉄2100系) is a DC electric multiple unit (EMU) train type operated by the Nagano Electric Railway in Japan on Snow Monkey limited express services since 26 February 2011, replacing the remaining ageing 2000 series trains.

The two 3-car sets were converted from former 253 series 3-car EMU sets Ne107 and Ne108, purchased from JR East in 2010 following their withdrawal from Narita Express services. They underwent modifications for wanman ("one man") driver only operation at Tokyu Car's Yokohama factory before being moved to the Nagano Electric Railway in December 2010 for final repainting.

== Formations ==
The two sets are formed as follows.

Car No.	1	2	3
E1	KuHa 2151 (ex KuRoHa 253-6)	MoHa 2101 (ex MoHa 253-18)	DeHa 2111 (ex KuMoHa 252-18)
E2	KuHa 2152 (ex KuRoHa 253-7)	MoHa 2102 (ex MoHa 253-19)	DeHa 2112 (ex KuMoHa 252-19)
Weight (t)	32.9	38.0	39.9
Seating capacity	44	42	48

Car 2 is fitted with one lozenge-type pantograph.

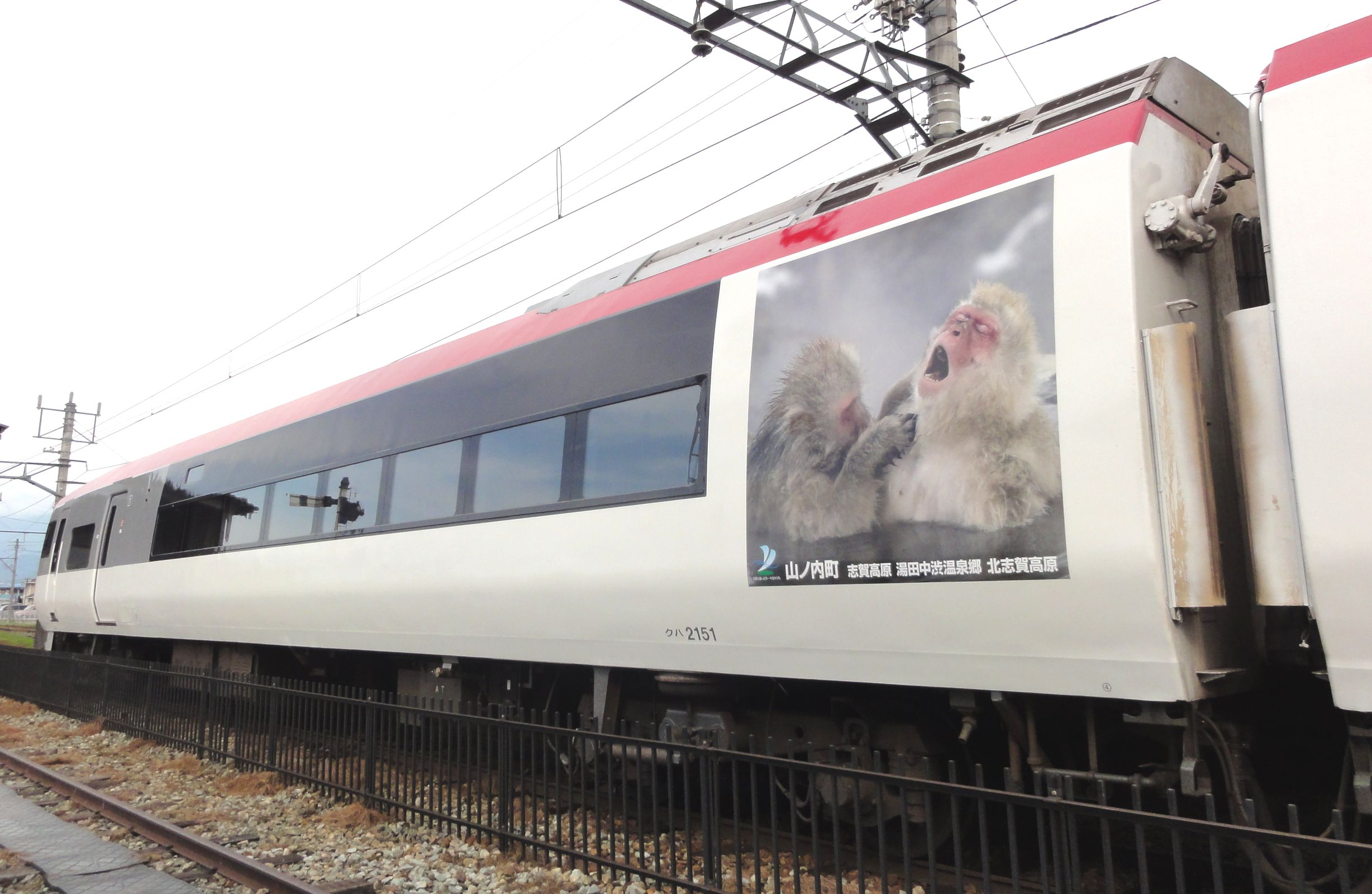
Car 1: KuHa 2151

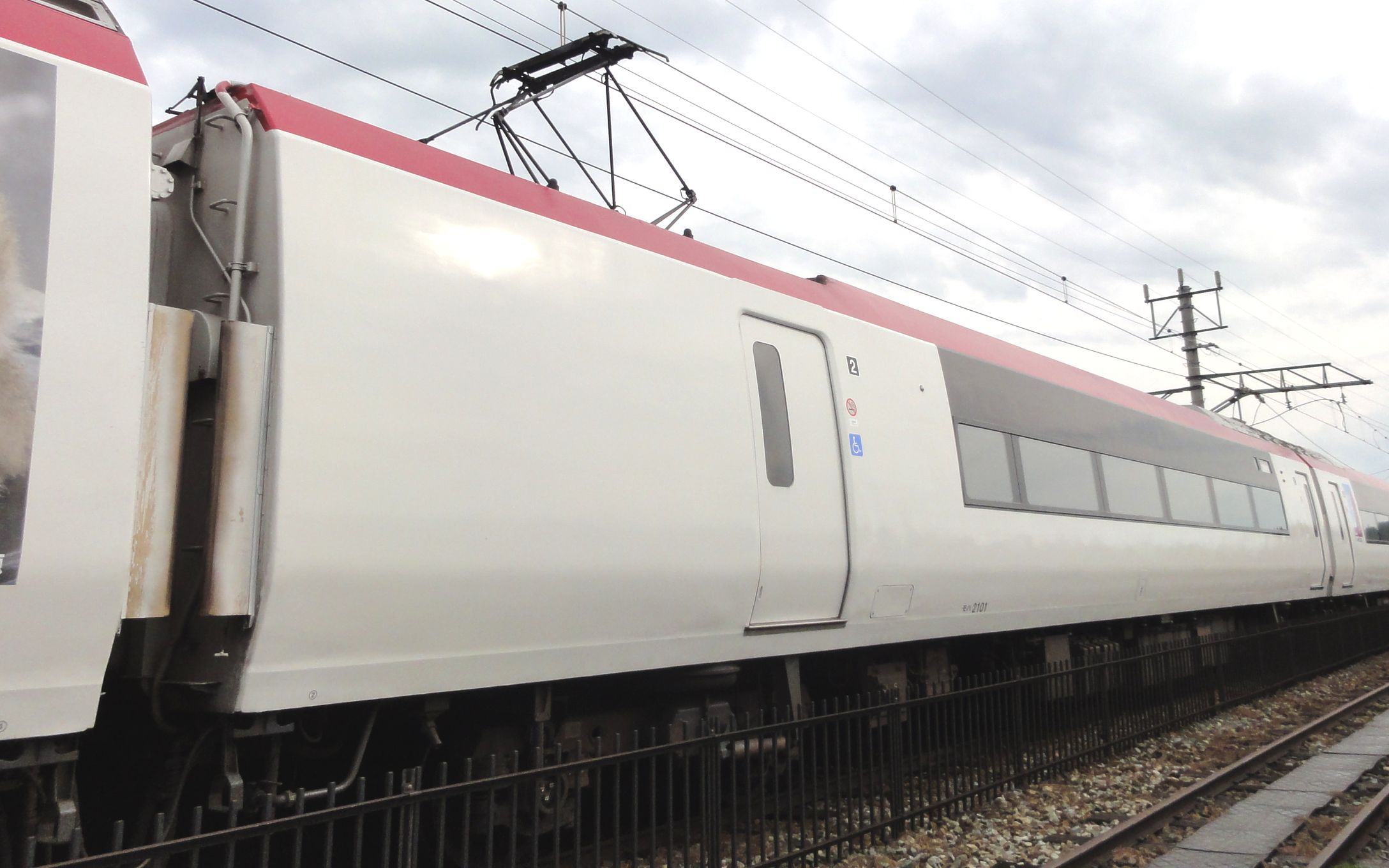
Car 2: MoHa 2101

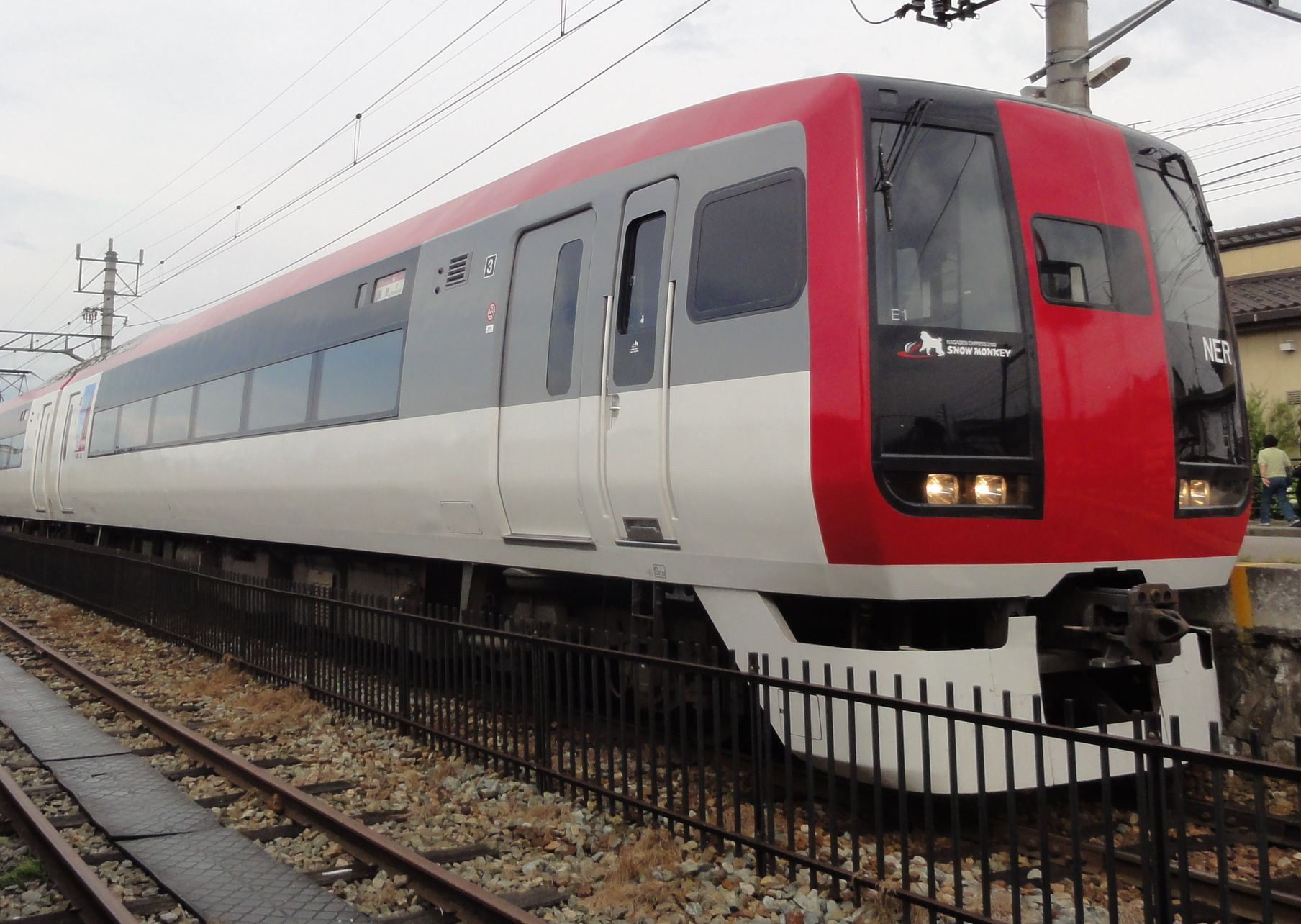
Car 3: DeHa 2111

== Exterior ==
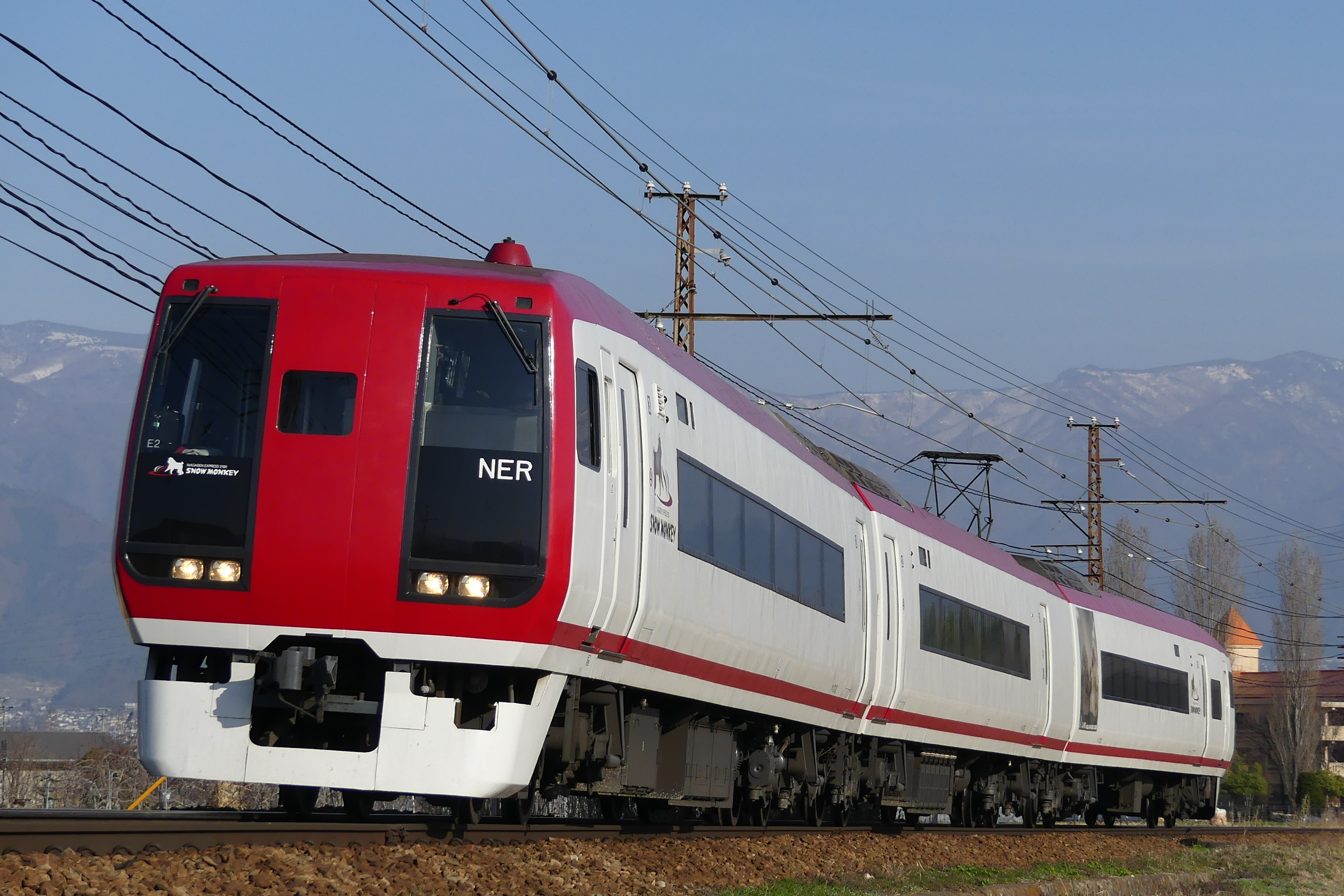
Set E2, March 2018

The trains were initially finished in the same livery of white, red, grey, and black, which they carried in the JR days. From September 2012, set E2 was repainted into a new livery of red and white without the grey and black bands of the original livery.

== Interior ==
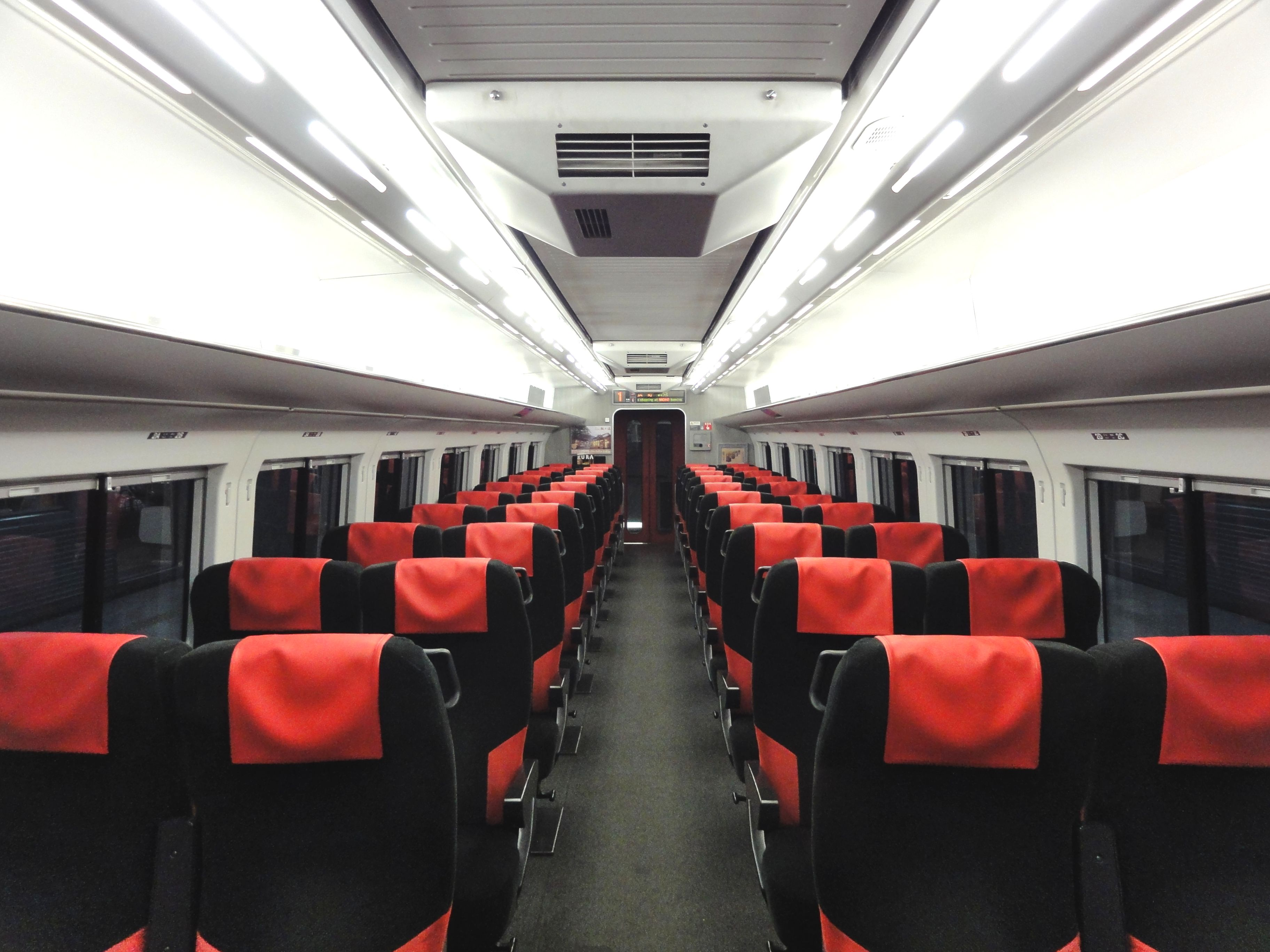
Interior view of KuHa 2152

Cars 2 and 3 retain the original seating arrangement with fixed unidirectional non-reclining seating, 2+2 abreast, facing a centre pair of 4-seat bays. Car 1 has reclining/rotating seating, and also retains the original private compartment, seating four persons, branded as "Spa Saloon" (Spa猿～ん, Spa sarūn), a pun on the Japanese word for monkey. The original toilets are retained, but are locked out of use.

== History ==
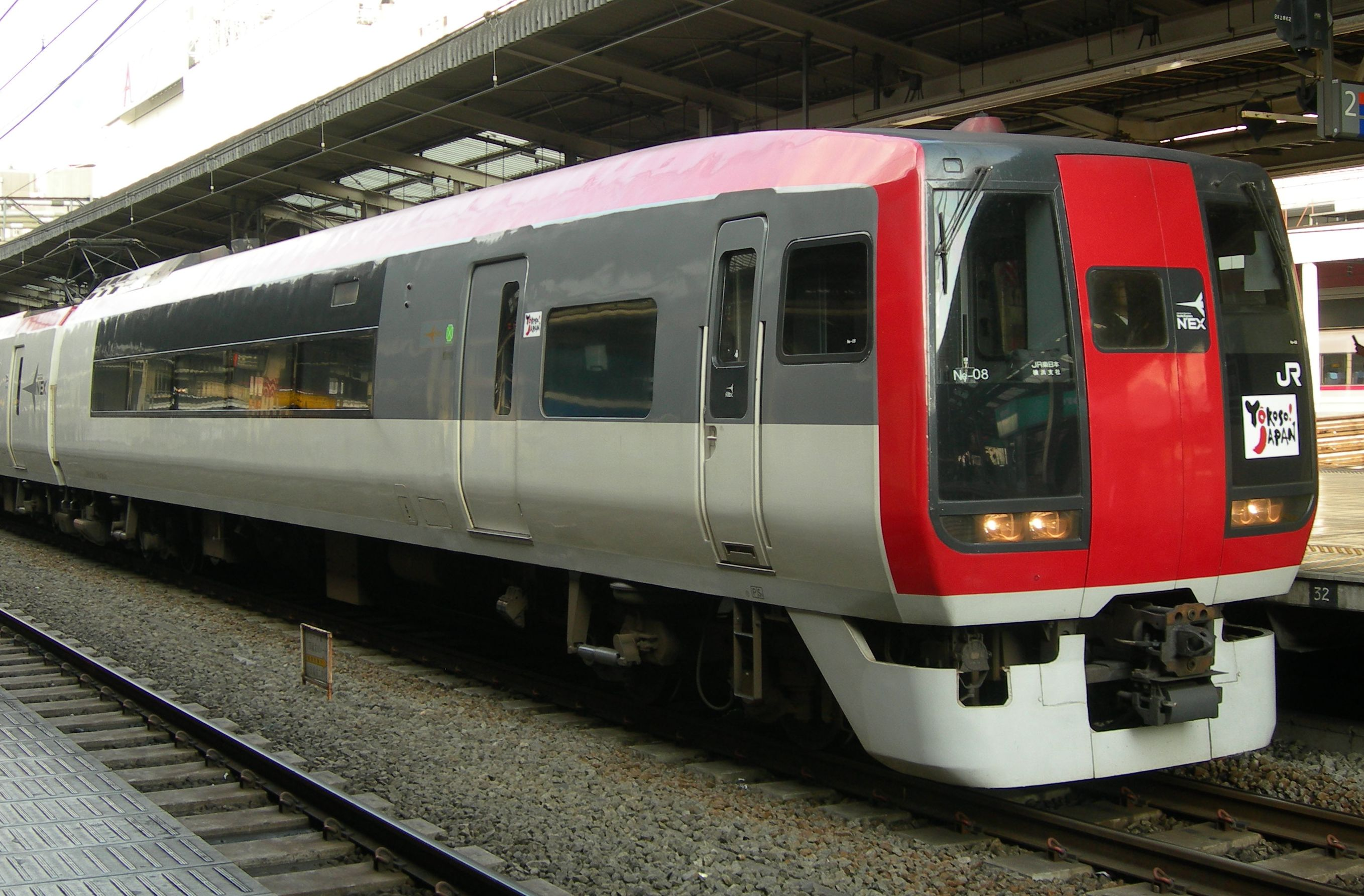
Former JR East 253 series EMU from which the 2100 series was converted, December 2009

- 3 June 2010: Nagano Electric Railway announces that it has purchased two 3-car 253 series EMU sets from JR East.
- 22 July 2010: Former 253 series sets Ne107 and Ne108 are moved from JR East's Nagano Works to Tokyu Car's Yokohama factory via Zushi Station.
- 19 November 2010: Nagano Electric Railway announces that the new trains will be named Snow Monkey.
- 24 December 2010: The two sets are moved from Tokyu Car to Nagano following modifications.
- 18 February 2011: The new trains are shown off to the press on a preview ride between Shinshū-Nakano and Suzaka.
- 20 February 2011: A preview ride on the new trains is offered between Nagano and Shinshū-Nakano.
- 26 February 2011: The new trains enter revenue service.

On 8 September 2012, set E2 was returned to service following general overhaul repainted into a new livery of red and white.
