= Doncaster Carr rail depot =

Railway vehicle maintenance depot in Doncaster, England

Coordinates: 53.5086°N 1.1326°W

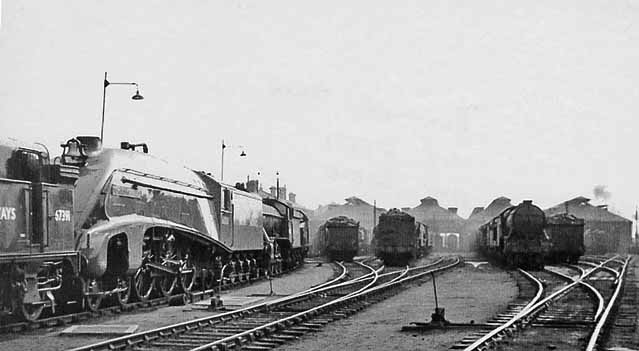
ex-GNR Class C2 BR 67391 (off left) and A4 Dominion of Canada (left) and other steam engines at the locomotive shed c. 1949

Doncaster Carr rail depot (also known as Doncaster Train Maintenance Centre) is a railway vehicle maintenance depot located alongside the East Coast Main Line in Doncaster, England. It is presently operated by Hitachi as part of their contract to maintain the AT300 units for London North Eastern Railway and TransPennine Express.

The original facility Doncaster Locomotive depot (Note: Also known as Doncaster Carr Motive Power Depot, Doncaster Carr shed) was a major 12 road steam locomotive maintenance shed built by the Great Northern Railway (GNR) in 1876. The shed remained in use under the successor companies London and North Eastern Railway and British Railways, being significantly modified in the mid-1950s; steam locomotive use at the shed ended in the 1960s. Until the facility was selected as a maintenance depot for the new AT300 fleet, the depot was used for diesel locomotive maintenance.

== Site history ==
=== Doncaster Carr locomotive shed (1876–2014) ===
By the 1850s the Great Northern Railway (GNR) had constructed a railway line to Doncaster; in the 1870s the railway facilities at Doncaster were undergoing enlargement, involving the reconstruction of the station, and the move of the locomotive servicing facilities to a site at Doncaster Carr suitable for accommodating around 100 engines. The engine shed was opened on 27 March 1876 with approximately 80 engines brought from the former shed.

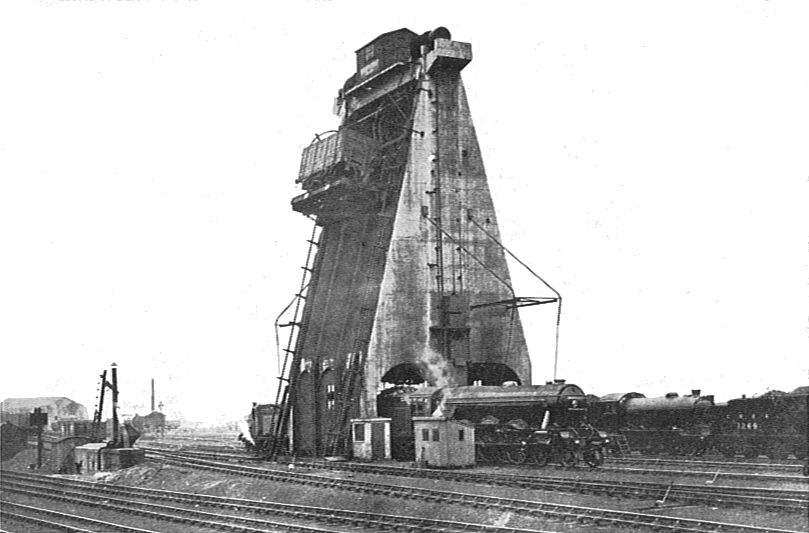
"Cenotaph" automated coaling and sanding stage, c. 1928

The 12 road engine shed was located in primarily agricultural land north of the GNR main line, approximately 0.6 miles (1 km) south-east of the town centre, and well outside the urban extent of the town. By 1900 the area included extensive sidings along the main line, as well as large wagon repair works to the south-east, south of the main line, and an additional smaller engine shed to the north-east of the main shed. (Note: The London and North Western Railway built and engine shed at Doncaster after obtaining running powers on the GNR. (See also Great Northern and London and North Western Joint Railway))

By the late 1920s the shed had an associated "Cenotaph" mechanical coaling plant amongst its facilities. The shed (then Doncaster Carr Motive Power Depot) was partially reconstructed in the mid-1950s, and the roof replaced.

Under British Rail the facility had shed code 36A. By the 1950s the shed was allocated around 170–180 locomotives, and had sub-sheds at Mexborough (see Mexborough shed), Frodingham, Barnsley and Retford. Steam locomotives were withdrawn from the shed by 1966.

Land in the area remained predominantly in railway use through the second half of the 20th century. The land to the north was developed as sidings ('Doncaster Wood Yard sidings') by the 1970s. In 2005 the depot (Doncaster Carr TMD/WRD) was operated by DB Schenker Rail (UK) as a light maintenance depot.

=== Doncaster Carr IEP depot (2014–) ===
In 2009 Hitachi became preferred bidder for the Intercity Express Programme (IEP); a program aiming to procurement mainline high-speed intercity trainsets from the Hitachi A-train family; in 2012 contracts were signed for the first phase of the project, for trains for the Great Western Main Line (GWML), with agreement reached on a second phase for replacement trains for the East Coast Main Line (ECML) – as part of the contract Hitachi was required to build a maintenance depot at Doncaster. It was also announced that Doncaster Carr would maintain the new fleets for TransPennine Express and Hull Trains, as these were also announced to be a part of the AT300 product too.

A planning application for a depot on the site of the former GNR engine shed was submitted in 2010. Initial specifications were for a 4 road maintenance shed, for 10 car (262 metres [860 ft]) trains, with an additional single road shed for maintaining separate diesel power cars, (Note: The design of the IEP was modified, replacing the separate diesel power unit with carriage mounted underfloor engines. See Intercity Express Programme.) and facilities for re-fuelling, wheel re-profiling, washing, and toilet emptying, as well as overnight stabling facilities (sidings for 4 full and 20 half trainsets) and staff and warehousing. The main building was to be roughly 300 by 55 m (984 by 180 ft) on a site of approximately 13 ha (32 acres). Road access was to be via 'Ten Pound Walk' which would require widening.

The plans were subsequently modified in further applications submitted between 2011 and 2013. The 2012 plans removed the separate power car maintenance shed, removed some cleaning facilities, and reduced the siding layout to a capacity of 20 five car (half train) sets due to changes in expected train timetabling, reducing the site's overall area. The 2013 plans re-instated a bio-cleaning pit, extended the train wash, and added an additional mainline track connection south of the main maintenance shed.

The contract for the second phase of the programme, including trains to run on the ECML was finalised in April 2014, allowing the construction of the Doncaster depot to begin, with the former Doncaster Carr DB Schenker depot closing in April 2014. The main contractors were VolkerFitzpatrick, on behalf of Hitachi Rail Europe, with RPS Group as project architects. The cost of the depot works was about £70 million.

As of January 2020, the depot maintains the Class 800 and Class 801 fleets for London North Eastern Railway as part of the original plan of the IEP. The depot also maintains the Class 802 for Transpennine, though this was not a part of the original IEP plan.

== See also ==
- Doncaster International Railport – intermodal freight facility immediately to the east
- Maliphant sidings, Swansea; Filton Triangle rail depot – new facilities for IEP trainsets on the GWML
- North Pole depot – London depot for the IEP
