= Maiden Erlegh School =

Location
- Silverdale Road; Earley; Reading, Berkshire, RG6 7HS; England
- Coordinates: 51.43748°N 0.92454°W

Information
- Type: Academy
- Motto: Qui Veut Peut (Traditional); Opportunity, Diversity and Success for All (modern)
- Local authority: Wokingham
- Trust: Maiden Erlegh Trust
- Department for Education URN: 136637 Tables
- Head teacher: Steve Jump
- Gender: Coeducational
- Age: 11 to 18
- Enrolment: 1,841
- Houses: Bolt, Attenborough, Curie, Wilde, Roddick, Yousafzai
- Website: http://maidenerleghschool.co.uk

Maiden Erlegh School is a coeducational secondary school and sixth form located in Earley (near Reading) in Berkshire, England.

It was established in 1962 as a Comprehensive school secondary school to serve the families of Wokingham. Today it is the lead school of Maiden Erlegh Trust, having converted to an academy in 2011. It has capacity for 1,788 students but currently has 1,824 students on roll, over 400 of whom are in its sixth form.

At the school's last Ofsted inspection (February 2020), it was named 'Outstanding' in all categories.

In April 2010 Maiden Erlegh celebrated 25 years of German Exchanges with Gymnasium Schloss Overhagen.

Maiden Erlegh School collaborates with local artists through its Community Arts programme, and hosts the Peacock Gallery which hosts regular exhibitions.

Maiden Erlegh School was ranked as the best non-selective school in Berkshire in The Real Schools Guide 2019.

== Notable former pupils ==
- Rosella Ayane, professional footballer for Tottenham Hotspur (among others) and a Morocco international.
- Sangeeta Bhabra, presenter of ITV Meridian Tonight
- Melvin Burgess, Carnegie Medal winning author
- Tom Holmes, professional footballer for Reading FC (among others).
- Tom McIntyre, professional footballer for Reading FC (among others) and Scotland U21 international.
- Michael Sprott, former British, Commonwealth, and European heavyweight champion boxer.
- Matthew Syed, a former table tennis Commonwealth champion and author
