= Mary Green (journalist) =

British radio and television presenter

Mary Green is a British radio and television presenter. She currently hosts the Sunday Breakfast Show on BBC Radio Berkshire from 7 am to 9 am.

Previously, she presented Thames Valley Tonight on ITV Thames Valley alongside Wesley Smith, covering the Central South and Meridian West regions, until 6 February 2009. Green had presented Meridian Tonight for Meridian West until 1 December 2006 when the Meridian West and Central South news services were combined to create Thames Valley Tonight/Today.

Green worked for ITV in the South of England for many years, having been employed previously by TVS and Channel Television. She worked in the Meridian South region between 1993 (when Meridian started broadcasting), until October 2001 when she joined the Meridian West team.
