= Intercity Express Programme =

Deployment of Hitachi trains on the British rail network

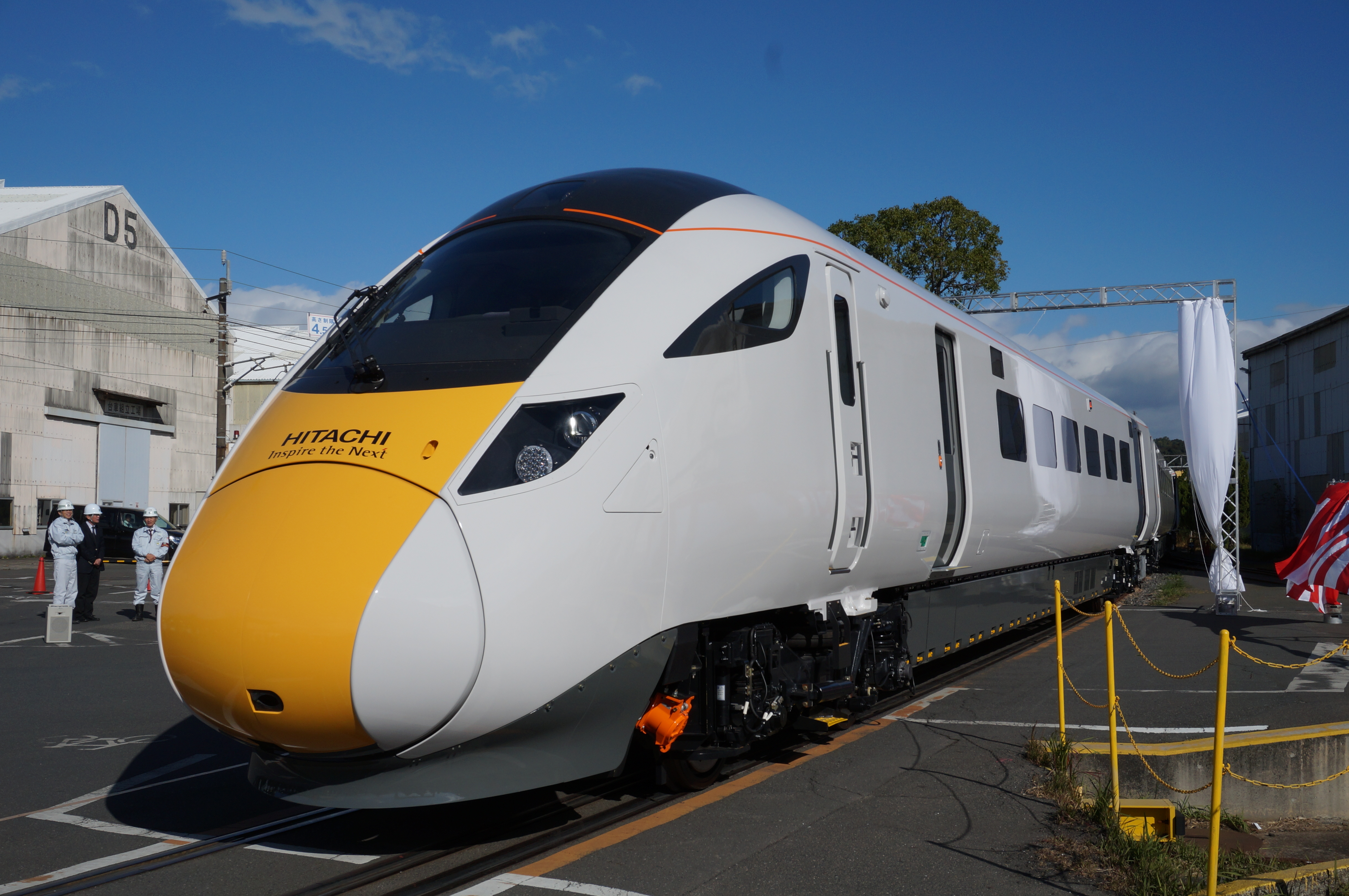
Hitachi Class 800 officially unveiled at Kasado, Japan, 13 November 2014

The Intercity Express Programme (IEP) was an initiative of the Department for Transport (DfT) in the United Kingdom to procure new trains to replace the InterCity 125 and InterCity 225 fleets on the East Coast Main Line and Great Western Main Line. These new trains were designed and produced by Hitachi as part of their A-train family, classified as Class 800 electro-diesel units and Class 801 electric multiple units. The trains are part of the Hitachi AT300 family, which are referred to by Hitachi as the Hitachi Super Express Train.

The IEP was launched by the DfT in 2005, at which point it was focused on procuring a replacement for the Intercity 125. In November 2007, an invitation to tender was sent to three shortlisted entities: Alstom–Barclays Rail Group; Express Rail Alliance (Bombardier, Siemens, Angel Trains and Babcock & Brown); and Hitachi Europe. On 12 February 2009, the British Government announced that Agility Trains had been selected as the preferred bidder for the contract; at this point, the pending contract, which included replacements for both Intercity 125 and 225 trains, had an estimated value of £7.5bn. The final decision on the contact's awarding, as well as its value and composition, which was originally expected by early 2009, was delayed by several years. One key cause of delays was the preparation of plans to electrify parts of the railway network, which would affect the final order. Other factors include the 2010 general election and by an independent 'value for money' report published in July 2010.

During March 2011, the final decision was taken to proceed with the IEP and to electrify the Great Western Main Line. An initial £4.5 billion order for 596 carriages for use on the East Coast and Great Western main lines was announced in July 2012. One year later, a £1.2bn option for a further 30 nine-car electric trains to replace the Intercity 225 on the East Coast Main Line was also taken up. During May 2016, it was confirmed by the DfT that, because of the late delivery of the Great Western electrification project, 21 "Class 801" trains would be converted to bi-mode operation and thus an increased number of trains would be diesel-equipped instead. Assembly of the majority of the trains took place at Hitachi's new train manufacturing facility in Newton Aycliffe, the construction of which taking place between 2013 and 2015. Furthermore, several new maintenance depots were constructed to support the IEP, these being the Doncaster Carr depot, Filton Triangle (Stoke Gifford), Maliphant Sidings (Swansea), and at the former Eurostar North Pole depot.

During January 2015, the first IEP train departed Hitachi's Kasado factory; post-delivery testing commenced at Old Dalby Test Track shortly after its arrival in the UK. The planned introduction of the IEP, more specifically its lack of guards and reduced catering facilities, led to industrial action being taken by members of the National Union of Rail, Maritime and Transport Workers (RMT). In October 2017, the first train went into service on the Great Western Mainline. In addition to those units ordered under the IEP initiative, numerous follow-on orders were received from First Great Western, Hull Trains, TransPennine Express, Lumo, East Midlands Railway, and Avanti West Coast. These newer units often feature various changes and improvements, including larger fuel tanks, more powerful engine arrangements, and shortened vehicles; they have been used to increase capacity or replace other train sets, such as the Class 180 and Class 221 Super Voyagers.

== History ==
=== Tender and specifications ===
The programme to procure a replacement for the Intercity 125 fleet was launched by the DfT in 2005. In March 2007, the DfT published an OJEU notice (2007/S 48-059536, contract title: Intercity Express Programme (IEP), previously referred to as HST2) announcing its intention to seek an organisation to finance, build, construct facilities (depots) for, and maintain over a period of around 30 years a new set of high-speed trains for the UK rail network, to be used by train operating companies. Initial estimates were for an order of between 500 and 2,000 vehicles.

The initial official train specifications for the tender were published in November 2007. Three versions of train were asked for: electrically powered via 25 kV AC 50 Hz overhead line, a self-powered version, and a 'bi-mode' version. (Note: The 'self-powered' version would get power from an in-built power source, assumed to be a diesel engine, and the 'bi-mode' version would be able to either get power from an in-built power source, or be electrically powered when on an electrified part of the rail network.)

The maximum allowed train length was 312 m, the minimum ('half-length') approximately 130 m. Trainsets were to be available in half-length, full-length (260 m), or intermediate-length versions, with the ability to lengthen and shorten trains in a time which would minimise that spent out of service. Also specified was the ability for multiple working within any vehicle of the class (two units), with the time taken to couple or uncouple being 180 seconds or better, and the ability to convert a bi-mode or self-powered train to an electrically powered version in the future. Bi-mode trains were required to be able to switch between power sources both whilst stationary and at speed. AWS, TPWS signalling was to be fitted dependent on route as well as ETCS Level 2 equipment.

The tender contained proposals for trains to enter service at the beginning of 2013, with complete introduction in the first phase on the East Coast Main Line (ECML) by late 2016 and on the Great Western Main Line (GWML) by 2017. The trains were to be used on the ECML and GWML, with possible use on the southern part of the West Coast Main Line (WCML), the Fen Line, and other long distance intercity services. Phase 1 of the tender specified an operational fleet of 24 full- and 13 half-length electric, and 10 full- and 12 half-length trains for the ECML, 24 full-length trains (self-powered), and 38 half-length bi-mode trains for the GWML. Additional trains were expected for Phase 2 of the order: around 15 full-, 14 half-, and 10 intermediate-length trains for the ECML, WCML, GWML and Cross Country routes, as well as the potential for orders of over 20 trains from Transport Scotland. (Note: Phase 1 represented 895 vehicles based on a 10-car full-length train. Phase 2: 498 vehicles. Additional units included the pre-series trains, and vehicles needed to cover maintenance and other contingencies. A total for phases 1 and 2 combined of around 1400 vehicles based on complete take-up of the order including WCML and Cross Country trains. Potential Transport Scotland orders were up to 29 half-length trains.)

The maximum weight of a full-length train was 362 tonnes (electric), 385 tonnes (bi-mode) and 392 tonnes (self-powered), with expected weights of around 332, 350 and 368 tonnes respectively or better. The minimum top speed was 125 mph (201 km/h), with a minimum acceleration for all subtypes in both full- and half-length formations of over 0.575 m/s^{2} (1.29 mph/s) from starting to over 50 km/h (31 mph).

The specification required significant improvements in energy efficiency over InterCity 125 trainsets that were fitted with MTU engines and electric Intercity 225 trainsets; regenerative braking on both self-powered and electric versions was expected to form part of the solution to increase efficiency. Mean distances between failure were expected to be better than 60,000 miles (electric power) and 30,000 miles (self-powered mode).

In November 2007, a contract award was expected in late 2008 or early 2009, with service trials beginning in 2012, and the trains in service on the GWML and ECML by 2015. The first tranche was expected to be for approximately 850 vehicles, with a maximum of 1500 vehicles subject to further orders being given.

On 16 November 2007, the Department for Transport issued its IEP Invitation to Tender to three shortlisted entities: Alstom-Barclays Rail Group; Express Rail Alliance (Bombardier, Siemens, Angel Trains and Babcock & Brown); and Hitachi Europe. After Alstom withdrew from the bidding in February 2008, Barclays Private Equity re-entered the project on 26 June 2008, four days before the end of the bidding process, as a partner of Hitachi and John Laing, in Agility Trains.

On 12 February 2009, the Government announced that Agility Trains was the preferred bidder for the contract, with the Siemens-Bombardier consortia as reserve bidders – the value of the contract was then estimated at £7.5bn, including replacements for both Intercity 125 and 225 trains. The decision was criticised for not awarding the contract to the Bombardier/Siemens offer which was expected to have resulted in work for Bombardier's Derby factory. The DfT was also accused of 'spin' in describing the Agility trains consortium as a 'British led consortium' (Note: Hitachi (Japan) was the largest contributor to the Agility trains consortium (40%), and significant parts of the manufacturing process including bodyshells and bogies would not be located in the United Kingdom.) and Hitachi's manufacturing plans attracted concern for reasons such as balance of payments issues, the Japanese domestic railway market being largely closed to foreign entrants, and the extent to which jobs would be safeguarded or created in the UK.

In addition to replacing trains on the ECML and GWML, a role was identified (Foster 2010a) for the design to replace other 'intercity' trains such as on long distance services from London to places including Cambridge, Oxford, Hull and Weston-super-Mare.

=== Agility Trains – Hitachi Super Express ===
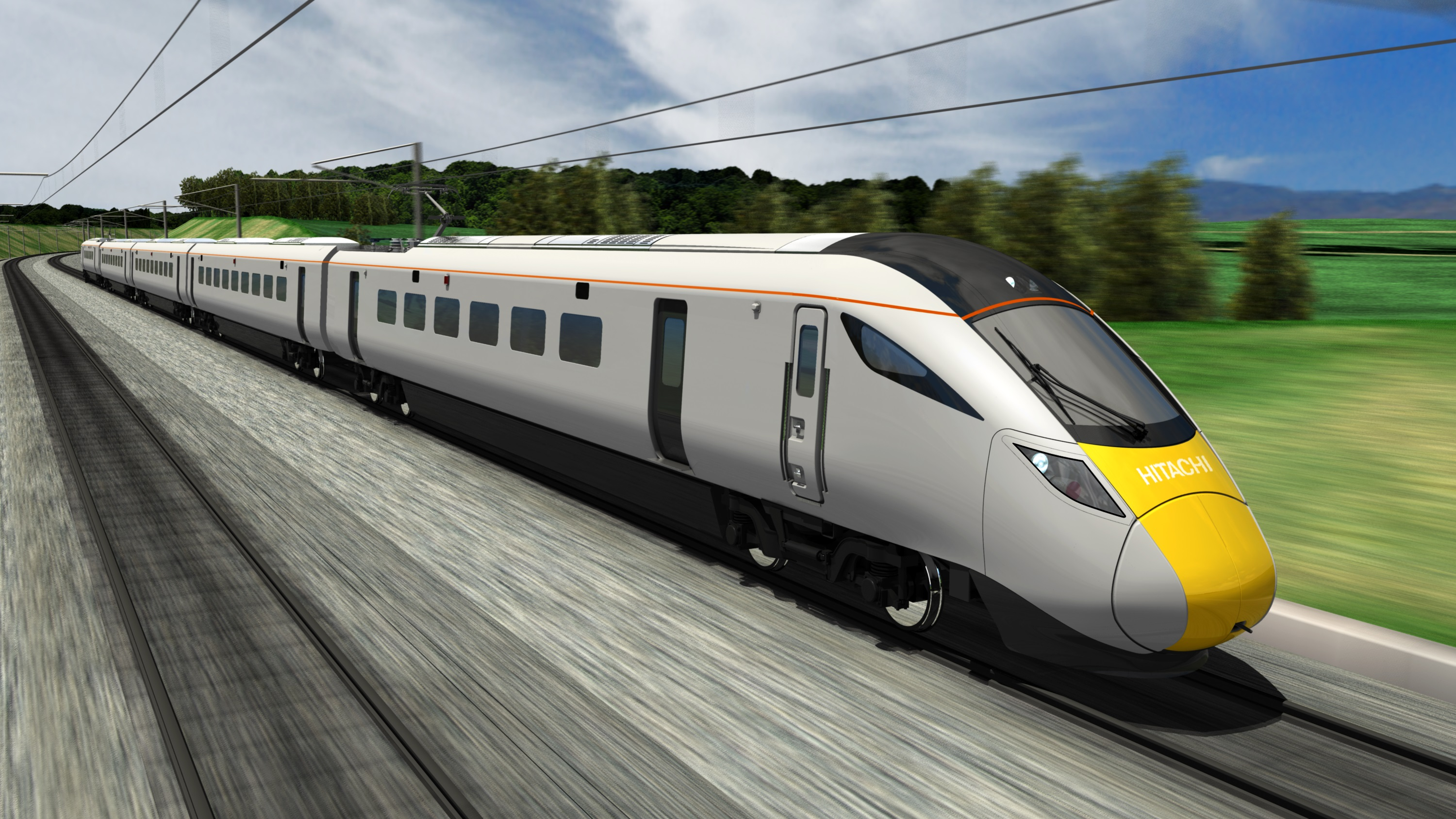
CGI impression of the train offered by Agility Trains (2009)

The preferred bidder, Agility Trains, offered a design named the Hitachi Super Express Train.

Agility Trains claimed that the proposed designs included a reduction in weight of the train of 15–40% per seat (86 tonnes less in total than an Intercity 125), and reduction in fuel consumption of up to 15%, using a hybrid traction power supply (see also Hayabusa (experimental train)). The trains were to be supplied with either five or ten coaches, with each coach being 26 m (85 ft), 3 m (9.8 ft) longer than British Rail Mark 3 and Mark 4 coaches. (Note: A longer carriage allows a train of similar length to be made up of fewer carriages and thus have a lower capital cost. However, the loading gauge of a longer carriage limits where it can operate; infrastructure work may be needed before the carriage can operate over a line.) Assembly of the trains was to take place in the UK, using Japanese-built bodyshells, with a new factory being established. Additionally new depots for train maintenance were to be constructed. (Note: Initially new depots were planned for Doncaster, Reading, Bristol Parkway, Leeds and North Pole (London).)

The full- and half-length trains were to be approximately 260 and 130 m (850 and 430 ft) respectively – the 26 m carriages were to be of aluminium construction, with the power cars of steel. The quoted tare masses for full-length trains (412.5 tonnes for the electric version) exceeded the tender's essential requirements (TS196) by up to 50 tonnes (electric version), power available for traction was quoted at 4 MW (all full-length versions), with a starting tractive effort of 400 kN, and a maximum acceleration of 0.75 m/s^{2} (1.7 mph/s). Train seating capacity in an intercity layout was 649 in a full-length electric train, reduced to 610 in a bi-mode train and 552 in a self-powered train, with standard class seat pitches of 875 mm (34.4 inches) in 'airline' formation, and 1,900 mm (75 inches) in bay seats. Seat pitch was reduced to 825 and 1,810 mm (32.5 and 71.3 inches) in interurban and commuter layouts. The design had increased seating space in electrically powered versions, with driving power cars also containing passengers.

The train used distributed traction; the end (driving) cars in a train would have contained either transformer and rectifier, or hybrid electrical generation apparatus and rectifier, depending on version, but would not have powered axles. The passenger carriages could be powered, with a traction converter supplied by the train's power bus, or unpowered, trailer vehicles. In ten-car trains the formation was (2'2')(Bo'Bo')(2'2')(Bo'Bo')(2'2')(Bo'Bo')(2'2')(Bo'Bo')(Bo'Bo')(2'2'), in five-car trains (2'2')(Bo'Bo')(Bo'Bo')(Bo'Bo')(2'2'). The trains could also be configured in formations from 5 to 12 carriages.

By 2010, reduced expectation of usage due to the economic downturn, as well as the expectation of electrification of much of the GWML had changed the composition of the order: the size of the order had been reduced to around 770 carriages; diesel-only trains were no longer required; some longer bi-mode trains would have a second transformer to avoid running under bi-mode power in electrified sections; and a wider variety of train lengths was required, including trains with five, seven, eight, nine and ten carriages.

By the end of 2010, Hitachi's original design had been modified to use under-floor diesel engines for self-power propulsion instead of engines in end-cars; the under-floor diesel engines can be removed, which allows the train to be converted to run only on electric power. The engines selected were 700 kW (940 hp) MTU 1600 Series V12 (MTU 12V 1600 R80L) powered engine-generator sets, conforming to EU IIIB emissions requirements, fitted with SCR exhaust gas treatment system; bi-mode trains were fitted with three engines (five-car) or five engines (nine-car), with electric-only trains having one engine per train for emergency power.

Capital costs for the vehicles (2012 price) were approximately £2.8 million per carriage for bi-mode versions and £2.4 million per carriage for electric versions.

=== Electrification ===
The proportions of traction types ordered would depend on decisions regarding further electrification. In late 2007, Network Rail suggested that the DfT should abandon the diesel version of the IEP as emissions regulations and the minimal demand for diesel-powered high-speed trains abroad made it cheaper to electrify lines and operate electric trains than to buy new diesel trains. In January 2009, the then Secretary of State for Transport, Geoff Hoon, stated that before finalising procurement plans he would need to consider electrification proposals from Network Rail in terms of cost, financing and benefit. In June 2009, Network Rail published a draft Electrification Strategy recommending electrification of the Midland Main Line and Great Western Main Line through to Oxford and Swansea, followed by some cross-country routes and the Reading to Plymouth Line. On 23 July 2009, the DfT presented plans to electrify the Great Western Main Line from London to Bristol and from Swindon to Swansea.

Following the Comprehensive Spending Review in October 2010, it was announced the lines from London to Didcot, Oxford and Newbury would be electrified in the following six years. On 1 March 2011, the extension from Didcot to Swindon, Bristol and Cardiff was announced.

=== Review ===
On 26 February 2010, the Transport Secretary, Andrew Adonis, announced that contract negotiations could not be completed before the 2010 United Kingdom general election, and a review was to be carried out on the value for money of the contract. Network Rail's commitment to electrify the main line between London and Bristol meant that the original assumptions used when formulating the procurement plan had changed; furthermore, passenger transport figure increases had not met expectations. (Note: By 2010, the phase 1 order had been reduced from ~900 to 700 carriages, mainly due to lower expectations of passenger numbers.(Foster 2010, p. 4, Specification of IEP)) Lord Adonis also blamed lack of financial support from the City. Additionally, a planned second phase, to introduce new trains to the specifications in the plan on the West Coast Main Line, was cancelled.

Opposition politicians, industry commentators and the Association of Train Operating Companies were critical of aspects of the scheme, particularly the micromanagement of the proposed trains' specifications, and lack of input from potential operators. Also, the Department for Transport's targets for energy consumption were reported to have been considered impracticable.

In July 2010, the report on the programme by Sir Andrew Foster was published, and the decision on whether to proceed with the programme deferred until after the Spending Review in October 2010 while alternatives were assessed. Other options examined in the report included combinations of: using existing carriages propelled by high-powered electric locomotives, Class 377, or re-engineered Class 319 or Class 365 commuter trains on some sections to compensate for demand, the use of Class 180 diesel trains on some non-electrified routes, or refurbished Intercity 125s, as well as infill electrification.

On 25 November 2010, the Secretary of State for Transport, Philip Hammond, announced that a final decision on the Intercity Express Programme would be deferred to 2011 along with decisions on further electrification of the rail system. In his report Foster had been critical of the bi-mode concept as untried and untested; two options for the non-electrified sections were being considered: coupling of an all-electric train to a diesel locomotive, or Agility Trains' proposal of bi-mode trains – electric trains with additional underfloor engines. On 1 March 2011, the government announced it was to continue with the programme with Agility Trains as the preferred bidder together with plans to electrify the Great Western Main Line as far as Cardiff; the order, reduced to £4.5bn in value was for approximately 500 carriages.

=== Contracts ===
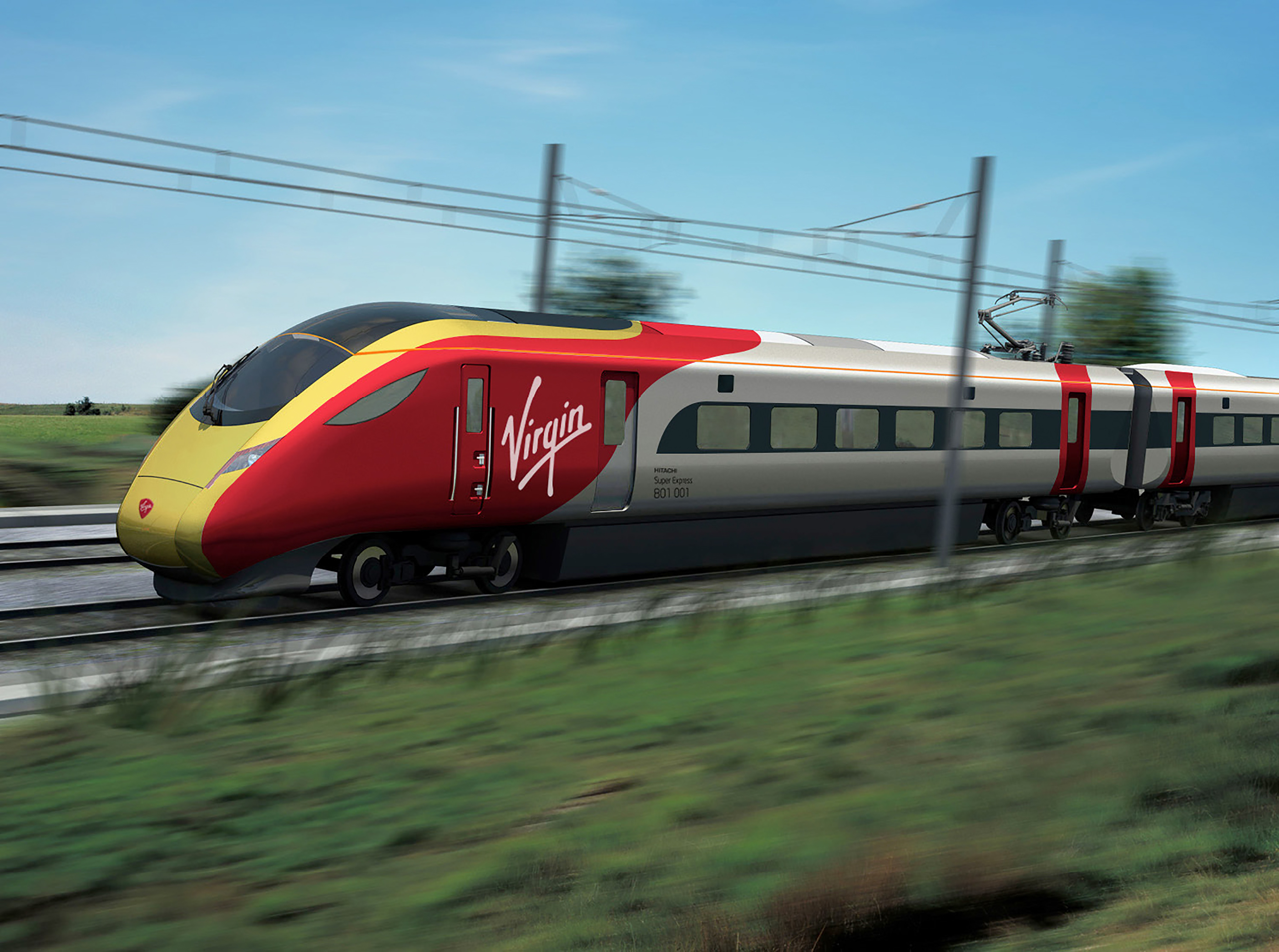
CGI impression of a train in Virgin Trains East Coast livery (2014)

During 2012, the Agility Trains consortia obtained financial backing from lenders including HSBC, Lloyds TSB, Mizuho and Bank of Tokyo Mitsubishi; a financing loan for trains for the Great Western Main Line (GWML) of £2.2bn was agreed by July 2012 including £1bn from the Japan Bank for International Cooperation (JBIC), with the remainder to come from lenders including HSBC, Lloyds-TSB, Mizuho, The Bank of Tokyo-Mitsubishi UFJ, Sumitomo Mitsui Banking Corporation, Sumitomo Mitsui Trust Bank, Mitsubishi UFJ Trust and Banking Corporation and the European Investment Bank (EIB). The project was the first mainline rail project in the UK to be financed through a Public Private Partnership. JBIC loans provided £1bn of the funding, EIB £235M, and £1bn was through loans from the commercial banks - the loan period was 29.5 years. A further £280M was raised by share issues and share backed loans.

The finalised £4.5bn contract for trains for the GWML and ECML was announced in July 2012. Financial closure was reached at the same time on the first phase of the contract, valued at £2.4bn, consisting of 21 nine-car electric (Class 801) and 36 five-car bi-mode trains (Class 800), 369 carriages total, for use on Great Western routes. (Note: Note: The Financial Times, "Hitachi secures largest UK train order." gives (incorrectly) order figures of approx 330 GWML and 270 ECML.) The second phase of the contract consisted of 10 five-car and 13 nine-car bi-mode and 12 five-car electric units (227 carriages) for use on the ECML; financial closure on the second phase was initially expected in 2013. A £1.2bn option for further 30 nine-car electric trains (270 carriages) to replace the Intercity 225 on the ECML was taken up on 18 July 2013. Financial closure on the second phase of the contract (total 65 ECML trains, 497 carriages) was reached in April 2014; the value of the contract was £2.7bn over a 27.5 year lease, including design, manufacture, and maintenance; financing was through a number of Japanese, British, and French financial institutions, and the EIB.

Agility Trains is to build and maintain the trainsets and receive payment from the train operator based on train availability. The Government is guaranteeing usage for 27 1/2 years.

Type	Phase	Number	Train type	Use route
Electric	First	21	9 car	GWML
Bi-mode	First	36	5 car	GWML
Electric	Second	12	5 car	ECML
Bi-mode	Second	13	9 car	ECML
Bi-mode	Second	10	5 car	ECML
Electric	(options)	30	9 car	ECML

During 2014, the National Audit Office reported on the handling of IEP and Thameslink rolling stock projects by the DfT. Issues specific to the IEP were the failure to re-submit the contract to tender after the terms of the contract change (electrification program) led to an altered bid from Hitachi. The report also questioned the DfT's attempt to take leadership in the project, contradictory to general policy, without any prior experience of large scale rolling stock procurement. The NAO also gave its opinion that the DfT had handled communications with bidders poorly, increasing the likelihood of a legal challenge to their decisions.

In October 2015, ITV News Meridian speculated that, because of the late delivery of the Great Western electrification project, an increased number of trains might have to be diesel-equipped; in May 2016, it was confirmed by the DfT that 21 "Class 801" trains would be converted to bi-mode operation. Subsequently, these were reclassified as Class 800/3.

=== Manufacture ===
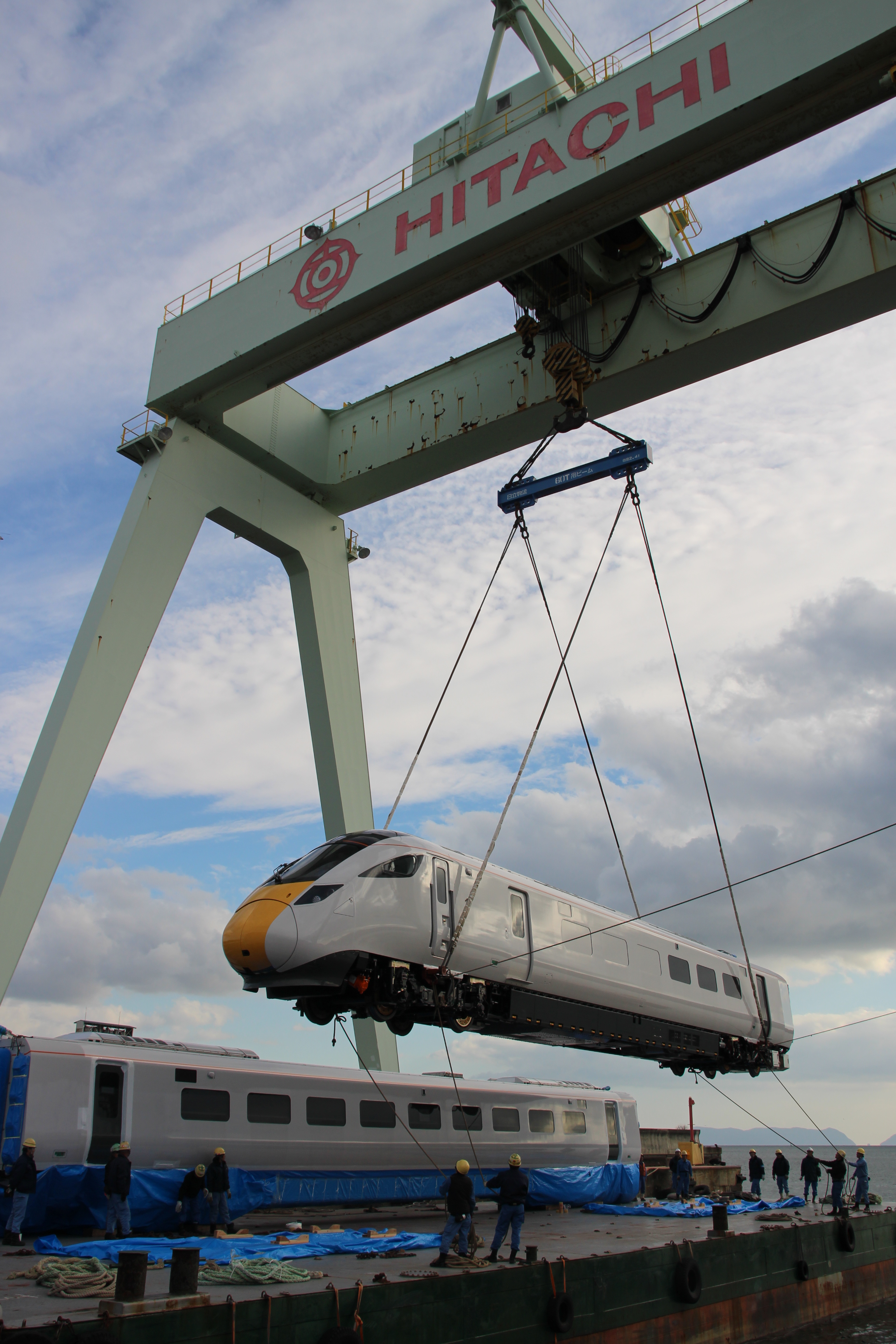
Class 800 being shipped from Hitachi, Kasado, Japan (January 2015)

In late 2012, MTU was announced as the preferred supplier of diesel engines; bi-mode trains are to be fitted with between three and five 700 kW (940 hp) engine generators powered by the 12-cylinder MTU 12V 1600 R80L. Electrically powered trains are also to be fitted with a single powerpack of the same design to be used for auxiliary and emergency power, and for shunting in depots. Other component suppliers included Knorr-Bremse (braking system), Brecknell Willis (pantograph) Televic Rail (passenger information systems), Dellner (gangway, coupler), Voith (SE-369 gear unit.), NSK (bearings), and Lucchini (wheelset). DCA Design was contracted to produce passenger interior and driving cab mockups for design validation; the design mockups were revealed in April 2014.

Signalling systems are to be supplied by Signalling Solutions Ltd. (ATP), and Siemens (GSM-R), Hitachi is to use its own ETCS signalling system on the trains.

Three pre-main production series trains were manufactured in Hitachi's Kasado plant; the first, a five-car class 800 unit was unveiled on 13 November 2014; ten further production series trains were to be manufactured in Japan before final assembly production switched to Newton Aycliffe.

==== Hitachi factory, Newton Aycliffe ====
During 2011, Hitachi chose the site of the UK factory at developer Merchant Place Developments' Amazon Park (later renamed Merchant Park mid 2013.) site in Newton Aycliffe, County Durham, close to Heighington railway station and adjacent to the Tees Valley Line. (Note: 54.59412°N 1.588495°W – location of the Hitachi factory, Amazon Park / Merchant Park, Newton Aycliffe.) Hitachi announced its intention to proceed with construction of the facility in July 2012, after financial closure was achieved for the part of the train order that concerned the GWML.

The contract for the construction of the £82M 43,000 m^{2} (460,000 sq ft) factory was awarded to Shepherd Group on 1 November 2013. Construction of the factory was scheduled to start in 2013, with train production beginning in 2015, and the plant reaching full production capacity in 2016. Erection of the frame of the factory was complete by June 2014, with an official topping out ceremony held in October 2014.

On 3 September 2015, the factory was officially opened in the presence of Hiroaki Nakanishi (Hitachi), Patrick McLoughlin (MP), Claire Perry (MP), George Osborne (MP), David Cameron (PM) and 500 guests.

=== Testing and introduction ===
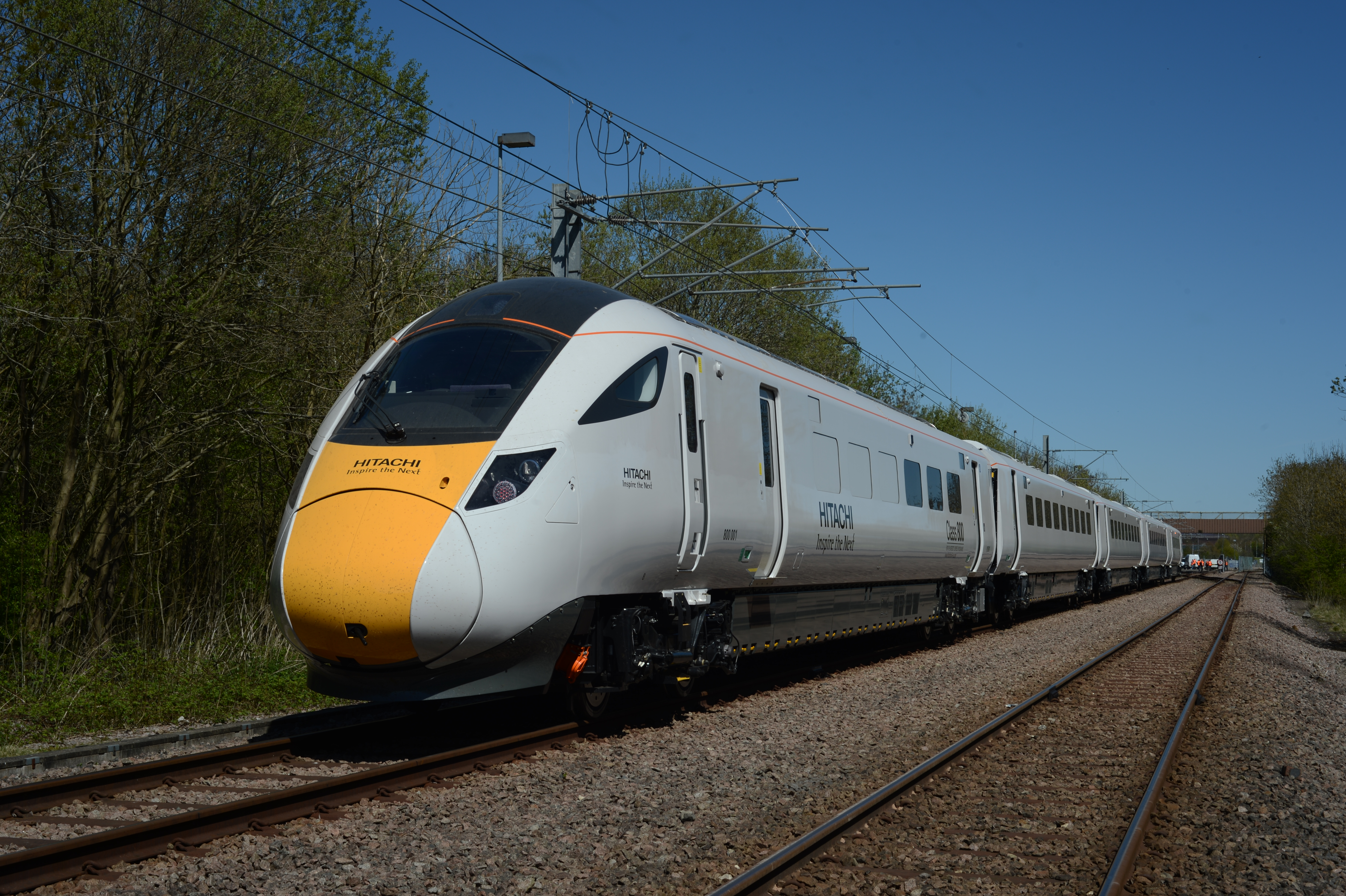
Hitachi Class 800 undergoing dynamic testing at Old Dalby test track (April 2015)

The first train left the Kasado factory on 7 January 2015 for shipping via Kobe, and arrived at Southampton, England, on 11 March 2015. At a speech given to the welcoming committee, rail transport minister Claire Perry requested that a new name be found for the trains. After-delivery testing was arranged to take place at Old Dalby Test Track; testing of a Class 800 train (number 001) at Old Dalby commenced in early 2015.

During mid-2015, the National Union of Rail, Maritime and Transport Workers (RMT) trade union voted for a 48-hour strike on First Great Western due to a dispute over plans by FGW to operate the IEP sets without guards or buffet cars.

In March 2016, the first unit for Virgin Trains East Coast was formally unveiled at King's Cross railway station, and named Virgin Azuma. In October 2017, the first train went into service on the Great Western Mainline. In May 2019, the first train entered service on the East Coast Mainline between London King's Cross and Leeds.

==== Depots ====
In addition to existing service facilities on the GWML and ECML, four new depots were required with other depots upgraded for the trains. On the GWML the new depots were at Filton Triangle, Stoke Gifford; at Maliphant Sidings in Swansea; and at the North Pole depot, west London. EC Harris was project manager for the three works.

On the ECML, initially the Clayhills depot in Aberdeen, and Bounds Green depot in London were planned to be upgraded, with a new depot at Doncaster. (see Doncaster IEP depot.) Agility Trains East ultimately required a new depot at Doncaster; and minor upgrades to the Bounds Green depot and Ferme Park depot in London and the Craigentinny depot in Edinburgh. Five more depots on the ECML line would be used by the fleet, and required minor modifications or additions - these included Neville Hill depot, Heaton depot in Newcastle, and depots at Inverness and Aberdeen.

== Related orders ==
Further orders in the Hitachi AT300 series

== See also ==
- High Speed 2 – project to build a new high-speed rail line connecting London with the Midlands and North of England.

== References and notes ==
=== Sources ===
- Intercity Express Programme: Invitation to tender, Department for Transport, 16 November 2007, archived from the original on 4 March 2010
  - McNutt, D; Ross, R (6 June 2011), Intercity Express Programme : Train Technical Specification : Document IEP-TEHC-REQ-35 (PDF), Department for Transport, archived from the original (PDF) on 19 February 2009, alternative archive: www.railwaysarchive.co.uk
  - Intercity Express Programme: Invitation to Tender (PDF), Department for Transport, 16 November 2007, archived from the original (PDF) on 4 March 2010
- Review of the Intercity Express Programme by Sir Andrew Foster, Department of Transport, 6 July 2010, archived from the original on 7 November 2012
  - Foster, Andrew (June 2010), A Review of the Intercity Express Programme (PDF), archived from the original (PDF) on 5 October 2011
  - Foster, Andrew (June 2010a), A Review of the Intercity Express Programme (Annex) (PDF), archived from the original (PDF) on 7 November 2012
- Intercity rail travel presentation to the Institute of Mechanical engineers, Department of Transport, 27 June 2011
- Project update: Intercity Express Programme Railtex 2013 (PDF), Hitachi, 2013, archived from the original (PDF) on 1 November 2013
