= LNER Azuma =

LNER Azuma may refer to:

- British Rail Class 800, a type of bi-mode multiple unit train
- British Rail Class 801, a type of electric multiple unit (EMU) train
