= Sally Biddulph =

British journalist and presenter

- Born: Sally Anne Mules; 16 October 1975 (age 50); Hitchin, Hertfordshire, England
- Occupations: Journalist, newsreader
- Years active: 1996–present
- Employer: ITN (2009–2025)
- Notable work: ITV News, ITV News London

Sally Anne Biddulph (née Mules; born 16 October 1975 in Hitchin, Hertfordshire) is a former English journalist and presenter employed by ITN between 2009–2025.

== Career ==
After a short stint working in business after university, Biddulph started her new career in journalism in newspapers writing for The Times and The Sunday Telegraph before moving into broadcasting, working in radio in Bern, Switzerland.

Later, she joined Westcountry Live in Plymouth as a production journalist, before branching out as a reporter and newsreader at ITV News Central in Abingdon and then a Political Correspondent for Thames Valley Tonight in Westminster.

Biddulph joined ITN in 2009, to work for the national ITV News. Since joining the company, she was a News Correspondent, Political Correspondent and a relief presenter on ITV News at 5:30, ITV Lunchtime News and ITV News Saturday primetime bulletins. From 2014, Biddulph was a newsreader for ITV News London during Good Morning Britain and reporter on ITV Lunchtime News. She also presented weekend daytime updates for ITV News and ITV News London on a rotating basis.
