= Doncaster railport =

Doncaster railport may refer to:

- Doncaster International Railport, opened in 1995
- Doncaster iPort, opened in 2018
