= ITV News Central =

British regional news programme

- Also known as: Good Morning Central; Central Tonight (2006–2013); Central News at Six (1999–2006); Central News (1982–2013)
- Genre: Regional news
- Presented by: Sameena Ali-Khan; Steve Clamp
- Starring: Des Coleman (weather)
- Theme music composer: David Hewson
- Opening theme: "Global Broadcast"
- Ending theme: "Global Broadcast"
- Country of origin: United Kingdom
- Original language: English

Production
- Executive producer: Liz Hannam (Head of News)
- Camera setup: Multi-camera
- Running time: 29 minutes (18:00 broadcast)
- Production company: ITV Central

Original release
- Network: ITV1 (ITV Central)
- Release: 1 January 1982 – present

Related
- ITV News; ITV Weather; Central Lobby; ATV Today (1964–1981)

ITV News Central is a British television news service for the East and West Midlands, broadcast and produced by ITV Central.

== History ==
Launched on Friday 1 January 1982, replacing ATV Today, Central News was initially a pan-regional service based in Birmingham airing a 6pm programme on weeknights alongside shorter weekday bulletins after ITN's News at One and News at Ten. During the rest of the decade, the region was eventually broken up into three sub-regions, receiving their own news service.

Separate services for the West and East of the region were planned to begin from day one, but an industrial dispute over the launch of the East Midlands service – and the opening of new studios in Nottingham – resulted in the entire region continuing to receive a sole pan-regional programme from Birmingham. The launch of the Nottingham-based service was initially delayed for a month, but the dispute was not resolved until September 1983, when the news service for the East Midlands was finally introduced. Within a few months, Nottingham operations were moved from a temporary set-up at Giltbrook to Central's new complex at nearby Lenton Lane.

On Monday 9 January 1989, a separate South Midlands service covering most of Oxfordshire, Gloucestershire, Herefordshire and parts of Berkshire, Northamptonshire, north Buckinghamshire, north Wiltshire and Ludlow was launched from a new computerised news centre in Abingdon. The first programme was infamous for the failure of the studio's electronic video system resulting in a calamitous broadcast. Thereafter, the Birmingham edition covered solely the West Midlands region (Shropshire (except Ludlow), Staffordshire, Warwickshire, the West Midlands and Worcestershire).

Originally, the main weekday evening programme did not have a different title from other bulletins. This finally changed on 8 March 1999, when the title Central News at Six was adopted – coinciding with being rescheduled from 6.25pm to 6pm. By Monday 24 July 2006, the 6pm programme had been renamed again, to Central Tonight (except for the South Midlands edition, which retained the Central News at Six name until its final 6pm programme on 1 December 2006). By December 2006, Central News bulletins during GMTV had become pan-regional across all three sub-regions. Weekend bulletins became pan-regional across the West and East Midlands earlier in the year, whilst the South Midlands retained its own weekend bulletins right up until the end of Central News South on 3 December 2006.

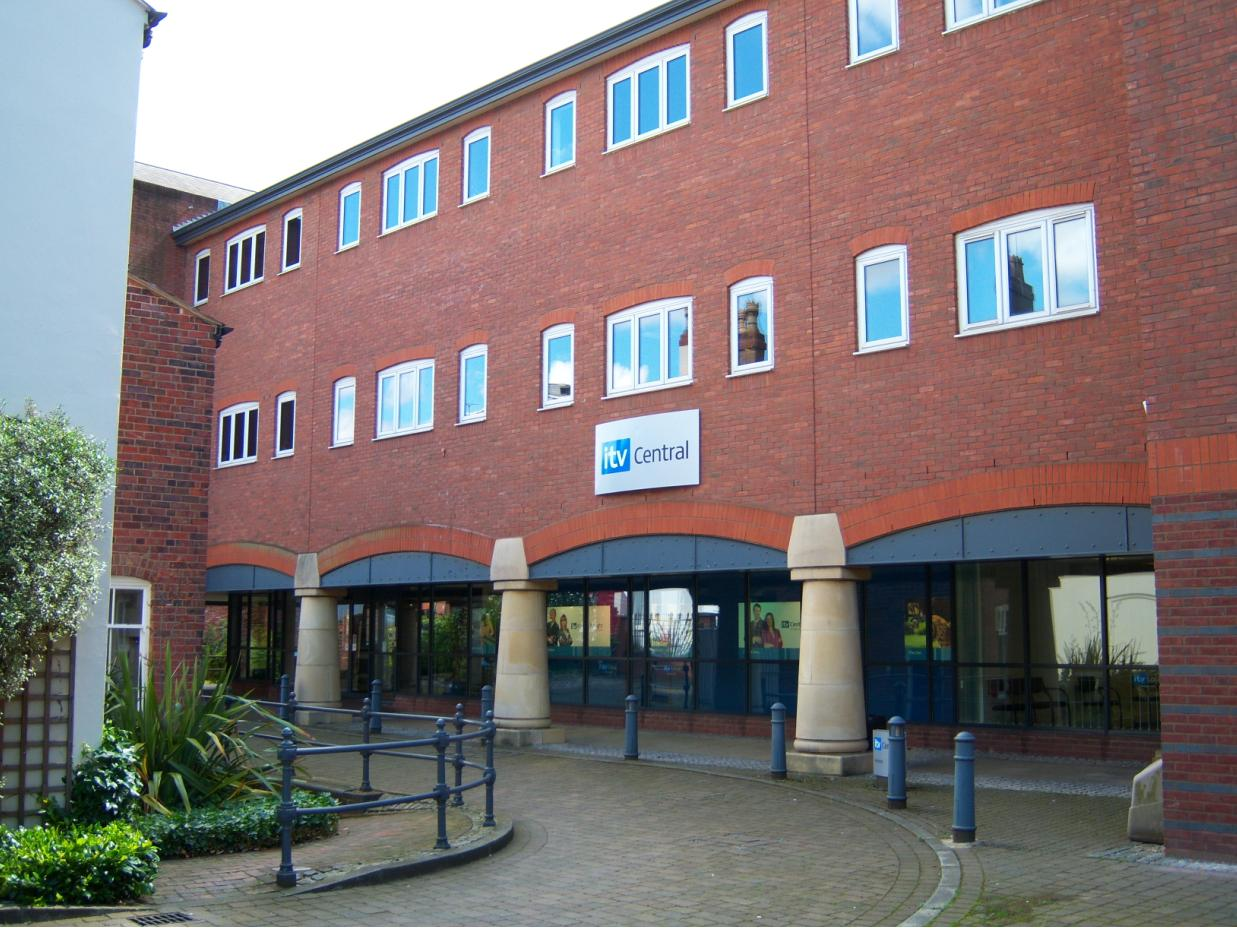
ITV Central is located in Gas Street, Birmingham

=== December 2006 – February 2009 ===
On 4 December 2006, the South Midlands sub-region was disbanded, as follows:

- The parts of Gloucestershire served by Central South joined the majority of the county already covered by ITV West and receiving The West Tonight broadcast from Bristol.
- Herefordshire and Ludlow was now covered by the West Midlands edition from Birmingham.
- In the rest of the region (Buckinghamshire, Oxfordshire and the Swindon area), news operations merged with Meridian West, to form the non-franchise ITV Thames Valley service, broadcasting Thames Valley Today/Tonight from the existing Meridian West studio in Whiteley, Hampshire. The new programme, which also covered Berkshire, Hampshire and parts of Surrey and Wiltshire retained Central's Abingdon newsroom as the main newsgathering base for the new region but the studio was closed.

Central News bulletins during GMTV were now pan-regional across the West Midlands and East Midlands only. Meanwhile, in what had now become the ITV Thames Valley region, bulletins during GMTV were pan-regional across the entire combined ITV Meridian and ITV Thames Valley regions (i.e., the entire South and South East of England), and branded as GMTV News. While weekend Meridian News bulletins were pan-regional in the South and South East sub-regions, Thames Valley Today/Tonight continued to produce its own weekend bulletins.

Central Tonight branding from November 2009– January 2013

=== February 2009 – September 2013 ===
As of 23 February 2009, lunchtime and early evening bulletins in the West and East Midlands on weekdays became pan-regional. The final sub-regional 6pm editions of Central Tonight were broadcast on Friday 20 February 2009.

The previous sub-regional elements were:

- A 6-minute opt-out during the main 6pm programme
- Localised weather forecast during the 6pm programme
- The full 8-minute late weeknight bulletins

Both sub-regional editions utilise the same presenter(s) and studio, therefore one of the two opt-outs (depending on the days news) is pre-recorded 'as live' shortly before broadcast.

On Monday 14 January 2013, the news service was relaunched and rebranded as ITV News Central.

=== September 2013 – present ===
On 23 July 2013, proposals for a more localised Channel 3 news service were approved – latterly, ITV News Central extended the East and West opt-out services from 6 minutes to at least 20 minutes during the half hour 6pm programme, in addition to separate lunchtime and weekend bulletins for the two sub-regions. The late night bulletins are also retained.

In the former Thames Valley region, plans were approved for a 10-minute opt out within the 6pm edition of ITV News Meridian for the south of England and a late night bulletin after News at Ten. The expanded sub-regional service launched on Monday 16 September 2013.

Central currently operates two sub-regions:

- Central West serving City of Birmingham, West Midlands, Staffordshire, Warwickshire, Shropshire, Worcestershire, Herefordshire and parts of Gloucestershire
- Central East serving Nottinghamshire, Derbyshire, Leicestershire, Rutland and parts of Lincolnshire and Northamptonshire – broadcast from Birmingham with a newsgathering centre based in Nottingham.
