= Swansea Maliphant Depot =

Railway depot in Swansea, Wales

Coordinates: 51.63037°N 3.93707°W

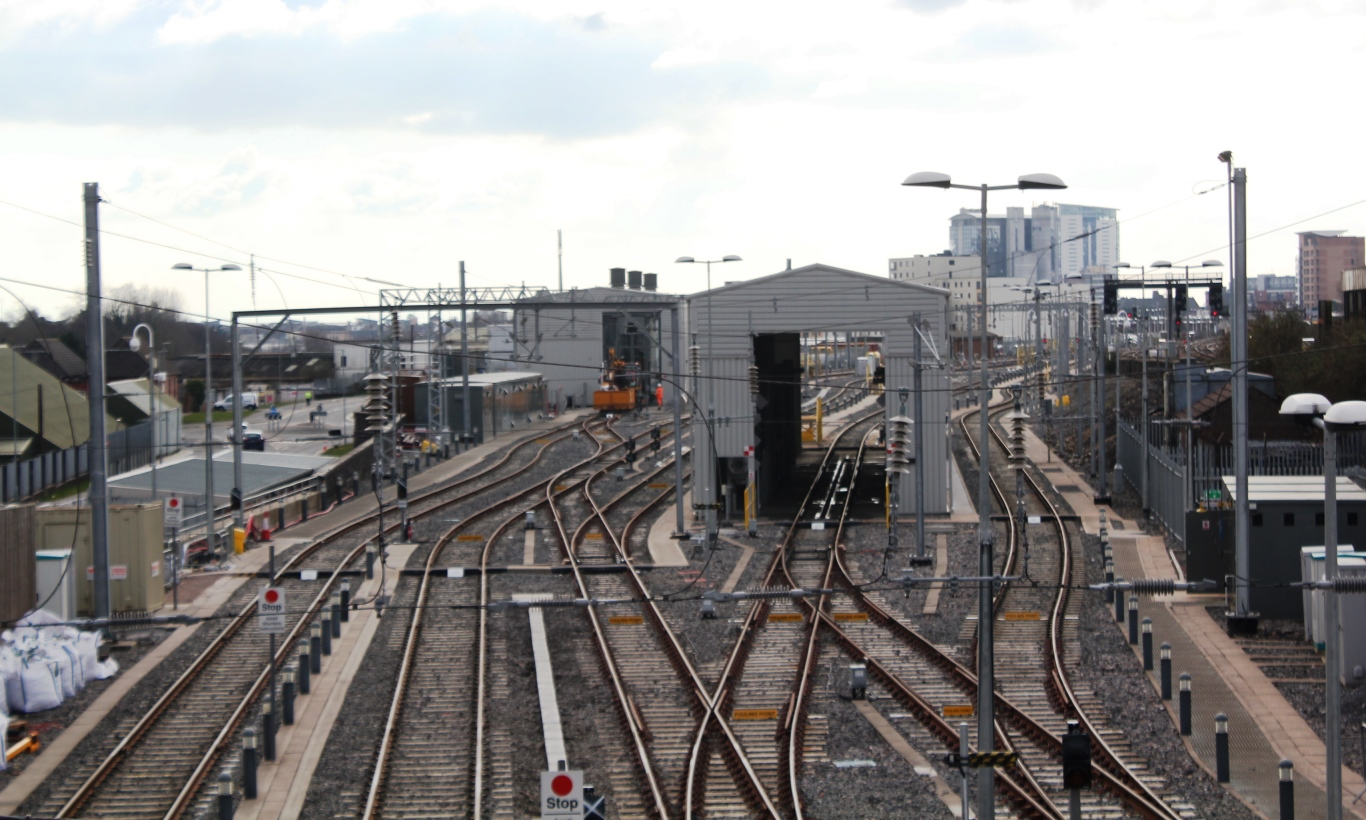
The new depot at Maliphant, looking towards Swansea railway station

Swansea Maliphant Depot, also known as Swansea Train Maintenance Centre, is a railway depot built for AT300 units from the Hitachi A-train under the Intercity Express Programme. The depot is situated north of Swansea railway station by the South Wales Main Line. Having been used as sidings until 2016, the depot is presently operated by Agility Trains as part of their contract to maintain the Class 800 fleet for Great Western Railway.

== History ==
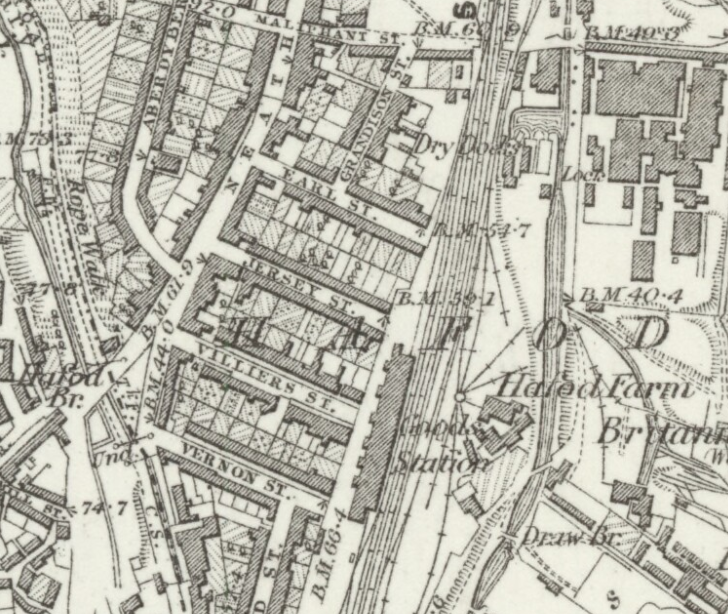
Maliphant Street and Maliphant Sidings, from an Ordnance Survey map of 1884.Swansea (High Street) station is to the south of the mapped area.

Swansea (High Street) railway station was built in 1850 for the South Wales Railway, which was absorbed into the Great Western Railway in 1863. Sidings were constructed north of the station on the east side of the main line railway out of High Street station, opposite a goods station on the west side; Maliphant Street passed beneath the main line of the railway north of the goods station.

The original facilities included a workshop, turntable, and carriage shed. By the 20th century the turntable and workshops had been removed and the site had been converted into extensive linear sidings, the sidings remained in that form for the next 100 years, with some changes to layout.

== Present ==
It was first announced in 2012 that the current sidings were to be the site of a new service depot for Great Western Railway's new AT300s from the Intercity Express Programme, with construction due to start in 2015. Modifications of the original plans were submitted in 2013; changes to the plans included expansion of some buildings, but they did not expand the scale of work expected to be carried out at the site.

The depot was completed in 2016 and became operational in 2017, employing 80 people. It includes an inspection building as well as train-washing and fuelling facilities.
