= North Pole Depot =

Railway depot in London

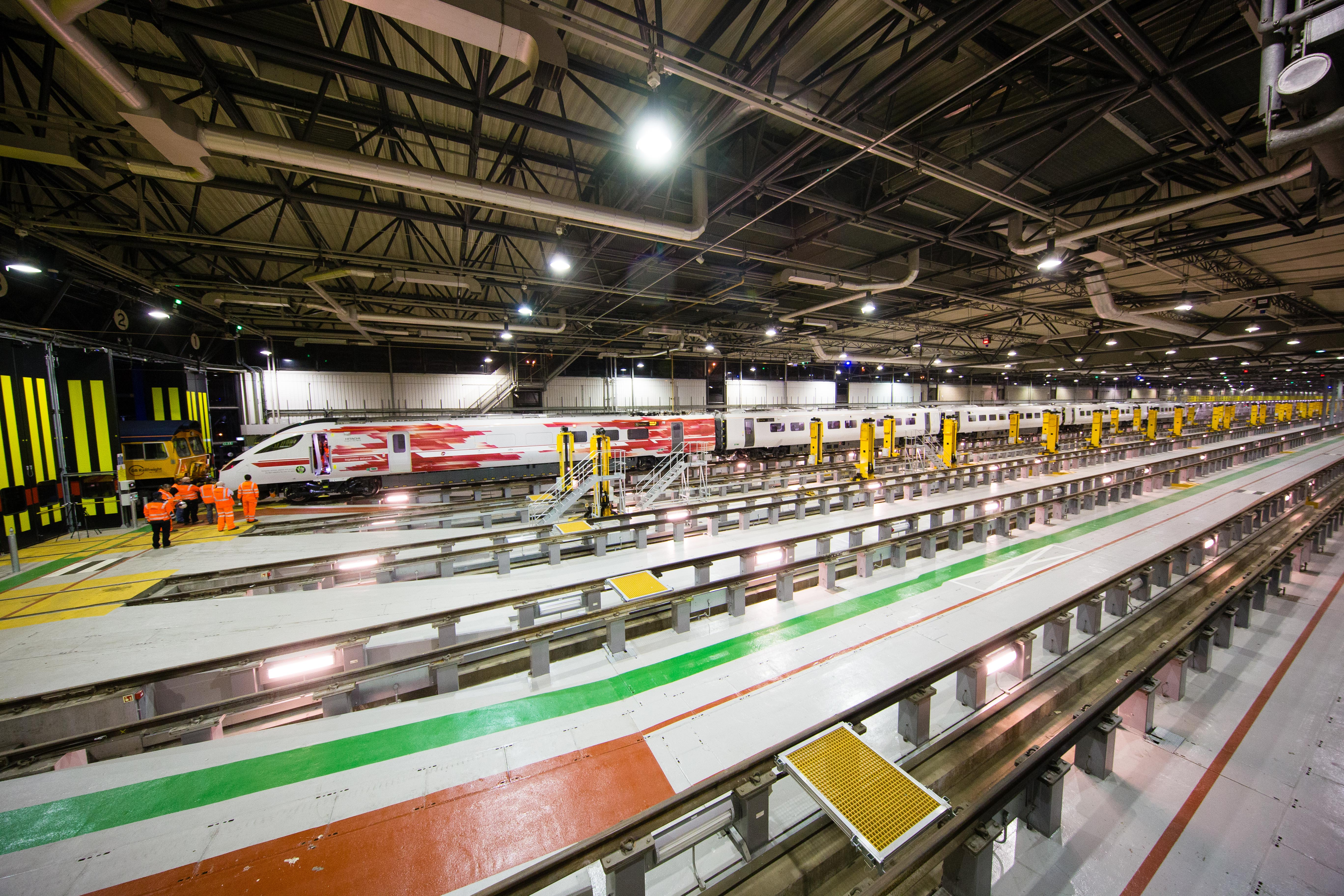
- A Class 800 in North Pole Depot in 2015
- Interactive map of North Pole Depot

Location
- Location: Old Oak Common, London, England
- Coordinates: 51.5253°N 0.2310°W

Characteristics
- Type: EMU

History
- Opened: 11 November 1992

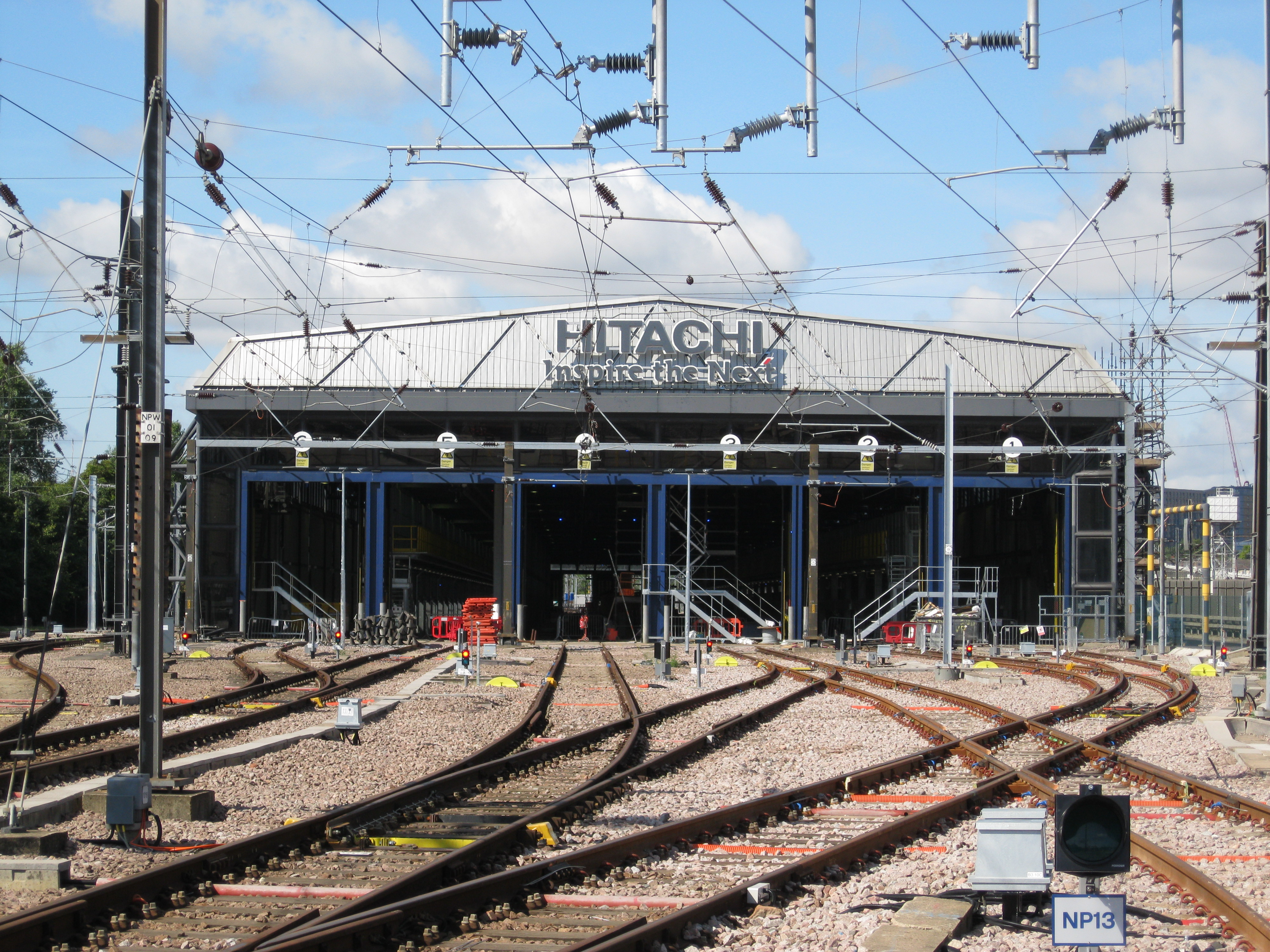
The exterior of Hitachi Rail's North Pole Train Maintenance Centre, West London, in August 2014

North Pole depot (also known as North Pole Train Maintenance Centre) is a railway and maintenance depot built for Great Western Railway's AT300 units from the Hitachi A-train family. Located in the London Borough of Hammersmith and Fulham, the depot was partially redeveloped by Agility Trains from 2013 as a maintenance site when they were awarded the Intercity Express Programme.

== Location ==
North Pole depot is located at two sites on either side of the West London Line, just north of North Pole junction. The western site with the six road maintenance shed is located adjacent to, and on the south side of the Great Western Main Line (GWML) opposite Old Oak Common depot. The eastern site with the four road heavy maintenance shed is accessed by rail via the western site passing under the West London line and the A219 (Scrubs Lane) at Mitre bridge.

== History ==
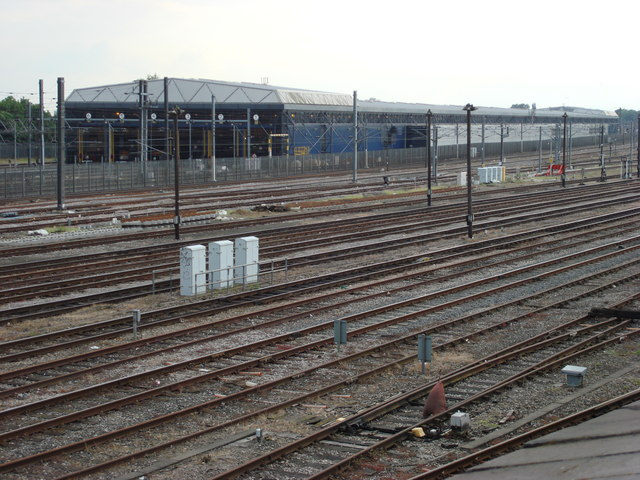
Maintenance building at western site of the North Pole International depot, view SW across GWML track (2007)

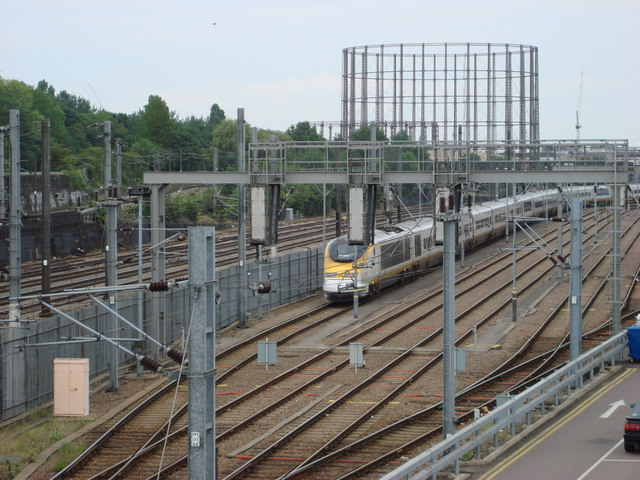
Eurostar at sidings of eastern site of North Pole depot, GWML on far side (2007)

=== Background ===
The depot was originally known as North Pole International. Historically the land at the western site was undeveloped, most of it lying on the northern part of the open land known as Wormwood Scrubs; a limited amount of land was used for sidings south of the Great Western Main Line (GWML). The depot was also used by Eurostar as the London depot for their fleet of Class 373 trains between 1994 and 2007 during the period when Eurostar trains ran from London Waterloo.

The eastern part was developed for railway use in the last quarter part of the 19th century. By 1870 a burrowing junction chord had been built, (Note: The West London loop (GWR) (OS. 1:2500. 1896), later Victoria Branch (OS. 1:2500. 1915–6, 1935)) connecting the West London Line (WLL) and the GWML by veering east off the WLL at North Pole Junction, then turning west passing under the WLL and connected to the GWML at West London Junction. In 1870 land in the northwestern corner of Little Wormwood Scrubs including Red House Farm and a gasworks was exchanged for 5 acres (2.0 ha) in the south east corner; much of the land was taken up by the establishment of a railway works; the West London Works. Track also connected the loop chord and works onto the GWML to the east. The works continued until after the second world war, the majority of the works had been closed and demolished by the early 1970s, leaving undeveloped ground.

=== North Pole International depot ===
A depot at North Pole, West London formed part of the 1970s aborted Channel Tunnel scheme. The Channel Tunnel Act 1987 sanctioned the construction of a train depot in the Borough of Hammersmith and Fulham and the Royal Borough of Kensington and Chelsea; the depot construction cost was £76 million; in addition to the construction the line from Waterloo International railway station to the depot (West London Line) was electrified. The designers were Mott MacDonald, the British Rail civil engineer, and YRM.

The depot opened in 1994, housing a 6-track 400 m (1,300 ft) shed used for light servicing and cleaning trains, a 4-track 200 m (660 ft) shed used for heavy overhaul and other facilities including a wheel lathe shed, a bogie repair shed, train washing and toilet and water changing facilities and a staff accommodation building.

In 2005 the closure of the depot was announced to be replaced by one directly linked to the Channel Tunnel Rail Link. On 14 November 2007 Eurostar moved its London terminus from Waterloo International station to St Pancras railway station and maintenance simultaneously moved to a new site at Temple Mills near Stratford International.

Potential re-use by conventional UK rail operators was limited by its electric trains equipment being unsuitable for general and diesel train operations; the site lacked an overhead crane, turntables, fuelling facilities and it lacked a connection to the GWML.

=== Intercity Express Programme ===
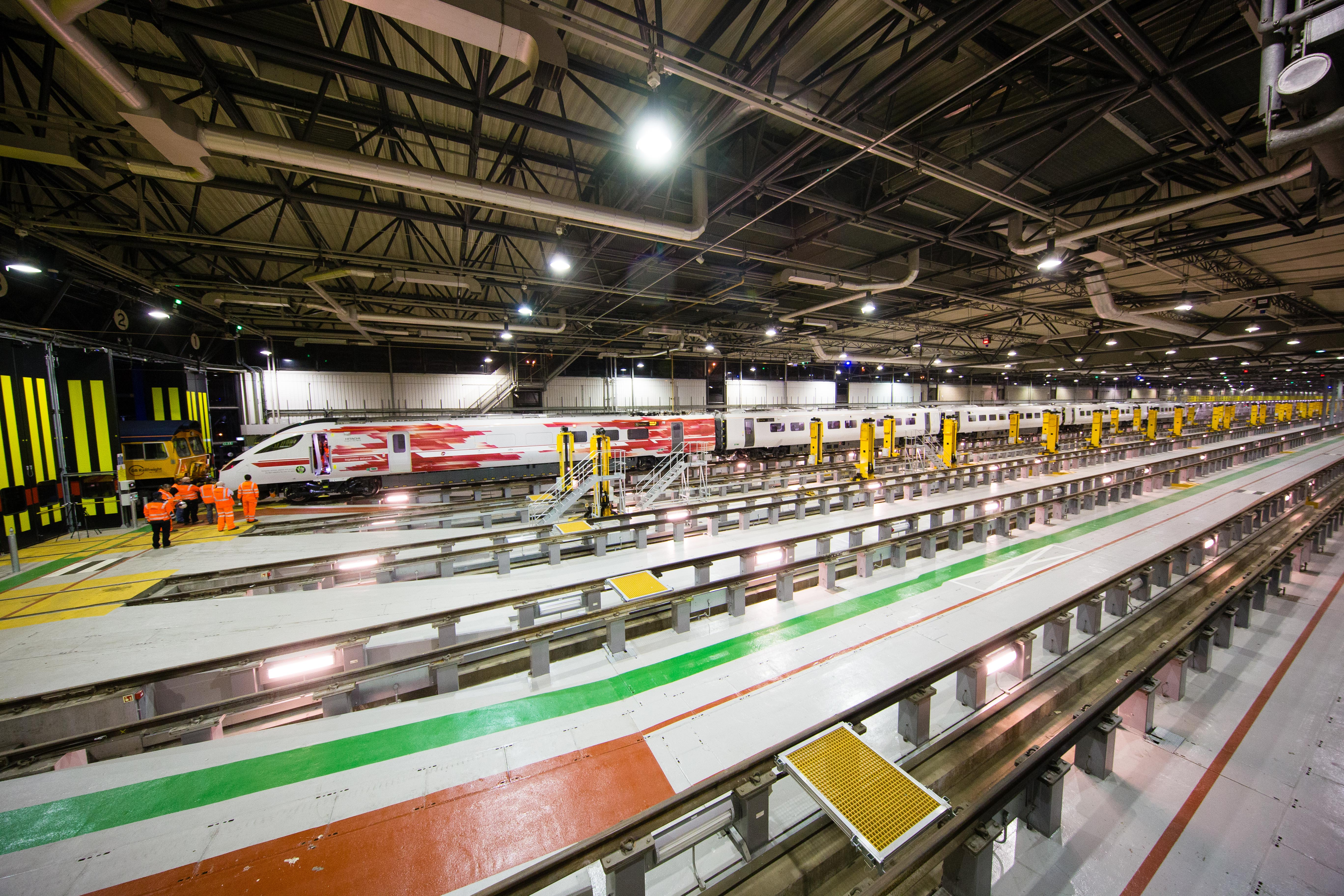
The arrival of the third pre-series train (T2) at North Pole Train Maintenance Centre, as part of the Intercity Express Programme.

In 2009, Agility Trains was listed as the preferred bidder for the Intercity Express Programme AT300 procurement; the North Pole depot was given as one of the sites to be used for the train's maintenance depot. These would be classes 800 and 802.

Hitachi submitted planning documents in 2011; the main large maintenance shed was planned to be re-used with the addition of an inspection pit. Carriage wash facilities were to be replaced, and oil, fuelling, toilet emptying and other train service facilities installed. The remainder of the site was to have minor modifications. The former heavy maintenance shed was outside the scope of the redevelopment; most of the works were in the western part of the site.

The main contractor for the conversion was VolkerFitzpatrick. The conversion work was practically complete by late 2015. The remodelled six road 400 m main building included : new inspection pits; a complete trainlift jack set for two five car trains on road 3, a bogie drop on road 4; an overhead crane on road 5; and a wheel lathe on road 6. Three of the six roads had overhead electrification.

In April 2023, it was confirmed that all Class 802 units would be moving to the Laira Traction and Rolling Stock Maintenance Depot in Plymouth.

== Future plans ==
Part of the eastern section of the site was included in re-development plans for the Kensal gasworks in the Royal Borough of Kensington and Chelsea. In one option a bridge would be created to provide a link between the existing communities to the south of the existing depot and a proposed Kensal Portobello Crossrail Station to the north of the railway lines on the former gasworks site.

London and Continental Railways is seeking to use the remainder of the site not used by the Intercity Express Programme for housing or commercial use.
