= Sangeeta Bhabra =

Television journalist

- Born: 19 February 1974 (age 52)
- Education: St Mary's University, Twickenham
- Occupation: Television Journalist
- Television: Meridian Tonight

Sangeeta Bhabra (born 19 February 1974) is a co-presenter of the regional news programme ITV News Meridian.

== Life ==
Bhabra was born in 1974, and describes herself as a "child of the 80s" and a lifelong avid fan of George Michael. Bhabra trained in journalism and achieved a Masters Degree in linguistics from St Mary's University, Twickenham. She says during her journalism training began as a volunteer at Hospital Radio Reading. She says her first commercial job was at County Sound Radio based in Guildford.

Bhabra first worked for Meridian Tonight as a regular presenter, reporter and Travel News presenter for the Thames Valley edition of the programme. She subsequently rose to be co-anchor of the defunct South East edition of the Meridian Tonight for a couple of years until February 2009.

Her catchphrase of Wherever you go, go safely proved to be a favourite with the viewers.

Meridian Tonight was reorganised in February 2009 and Bhabra took over as co-presenter with long-standing presenter Fred Dinenage. Following his retirement she has co-presented with Matt Teale since early 2022.

=== Other work ===
Outside of news, Bhabra has presented special programmes for ITV Yorkshire about the IFA awards in Leeds in 2007.

=== Awards ===
In 2015, Bhabra won regional journalist of the year at the Asian Media Awards (AMA).
