= Matt Teale =

English broadcast journalist (born 1975)

- Born: Matthew James Teale; 7 March 1975 (age 50); Hereford, Herefordshire, England
- Occupations: Newsreader and journalist
- Years active: 1996–present
- Employer: ITV Meridian
- Television: ITV News Meridian

Matthew James "Matt" Teale (born 7 March 1975 in Hereford, Herefordshire) is an English broadcast journalist employed by ITV Meridian.

== Broadcasting career ==
Matt Teale was with ITV in the Midlands from 1997 until 2022 before becoming one of the two main presenters of ITV News Meridian in 2022. He also works in a freelance capacity for the British Forces Broadcasting Service and Sky News. After studying for a degree in Broadcast Journalism at Nottingham Trent University, Teale began his career at ITV's East Midlands news service before working for their Regional Programmes Department as a researcher, producer, director and series producer on various regional and network programmes.

In 2005, Teale joined Central Independent Television's sports team as a reporter based in Birmingham where he and Sarah Jane Mee covered the sports news for Central Tonight.

Teale covered his last sports report for Central Tonight in 2007 before he became a presenter on Setanta Sports News which was made by ITN. He presented the 17:00-21:00 slot weekdays, with Rachel Brookes, until the channel ceased broadcasting in June 2009. He also presented the first season of the Indian Premier League cricket coverage for Setanta Sports as well as specialist programmes on Boxing, Cricket and Mixed Martial Arts.

In August 2009, it was announced that Teale would take over from veteran newscaster Alastair Stewart as co-presenter of London Tonight alongside Katie Derham and Nina Hossain. He made his debut on 25 August 2009 as a relief presenter, and as main co-presenter from 7 September 2009.

Since September 2009, Teale has occasionally presented early-morning and lunchtime bulletins of the ITV News and the weekend editions of ITV News London. He has presented sports news on Sky News from June 2010.

On 2 February 2012 he rejoined ITV News Central presenting alongside Sameena Ali-Khan.

Teale also appeared on the British Forces Broadcasting Service and was one of the main anchors on their new service, Forces TV, which began broadcasting in June 2014.

In December 2021, it was announced that Teale would be replacing Fred Dinenage as co-presenter of ITV News Meridian. He presented his first edition in February 2022.
