= Stoke Gifford depot =

Train maintenance facility in South West England

Coordinates: 51.5169°N 2.55798°W

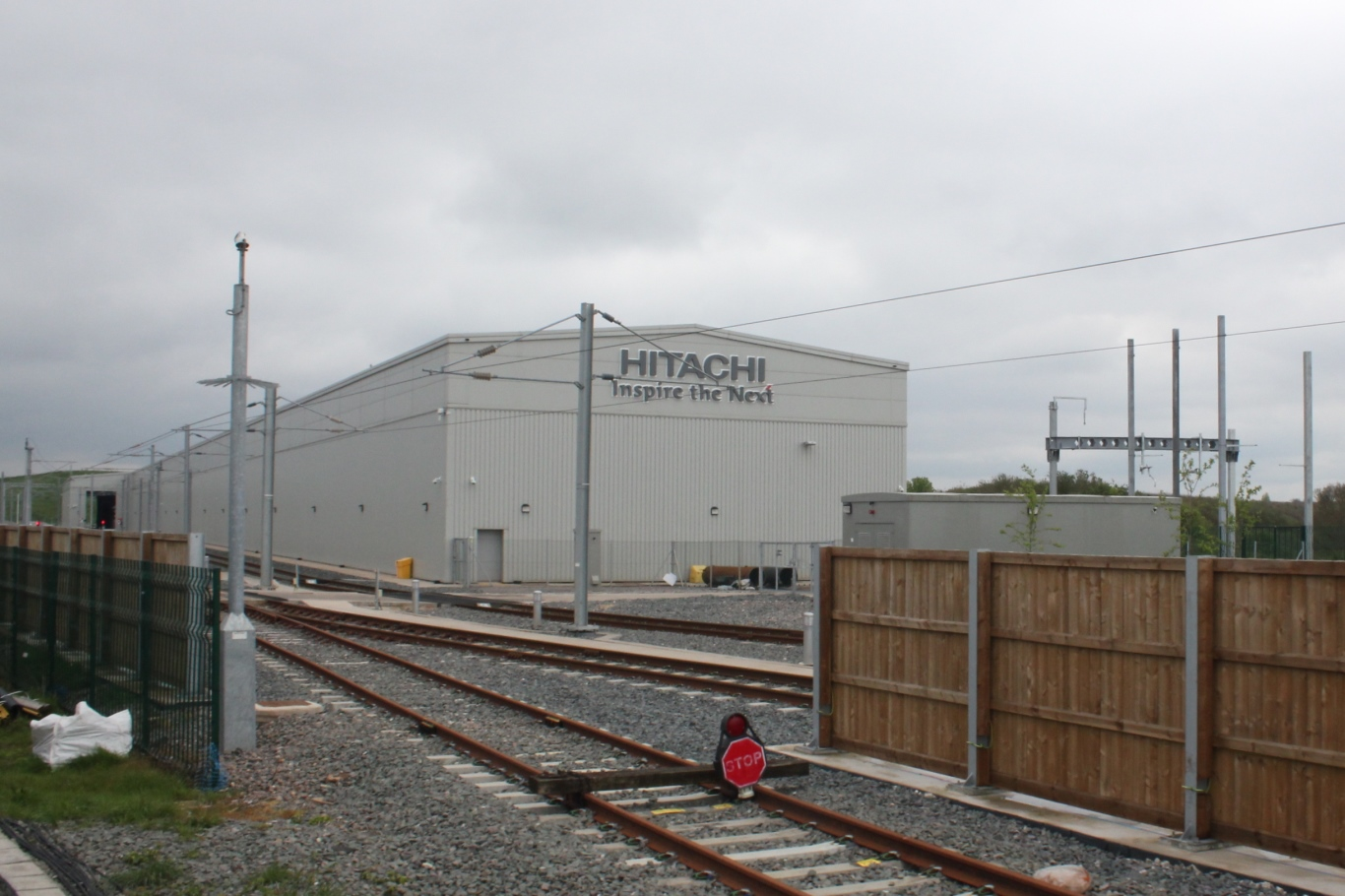
- Interactive map of Stoke Gifford depot

Location
- Location: Stoke Gifford, England

Characteristics
- Owner: Agility Trains
- Operator: Agility Trains
- Type: EMU
- Rolling stock: Class 800

History
- Opened: 2016

Stoke Gifford depot (or the Filton Triangle depot) is a railway depot built for AT300 units from the Hitachi A-train procured under the Intercity Express Programme. The depot is situated between Filton and Stoke Gifford at a junction intersection of the Cross Country Route, South Wales Main Line and the Filton to Avonmouth Docks line. It is operated by Agility Trains as part of its contract to maintain the Class 800 fleet operated by Great Western Railway.

== Location ==
The depot is sited approximately halfway between Stoke Gifford and Filton, on land bounded by railway lines.

The site is approximately triangular shaped, 16 ha (40 acres) in area, formed by boundaries created by three railway lines: to the south, the Bristol Parkway to Avonmouth Docks (the Filton to Avonmouth Line); the western boundary is formed by the former Bristol and South Wales Union Railway (B&SWUR) route; the north-east boundary is formed by a chord connecting Bristol Parkway to the former B&SWUR line for the Severn Tunnel. (Note: The railway chord at the northeastern boundary of the site is from Stoke Gifford junction to Patchway junction. It connects the 1860s north-south running Bristol and South Wales Union Railway to the 1900s east/west running London, Bristol and South Wales Direct Railway (also known as the 'Badminton Line'). Network Rail refers to the line through Bristol Parkway as the South Wales and Bristol Direct Line (including the Stoke Gifford/Patchway chord), and refers to the north-south line as the Bristol and South Wales Line. (see also South Wales Main Line))

== History ==
=== Background ===
In the early 19th century the land between Stoke Gifford and Filton was essentially rural. The first railway at the location was the north-south Bristol and South Wales Union Railway (1860s); followed by the eastward London, Bristol and South Wales Direct Railway (1900s); and the Filton to Avonmouth Line (1910s). The lands at the other three corners formed by the intersection of the east-west and north-south lines were also enclosed by connecting embanked earthworks of connecting chords by the 1920s. (Note: See also, information in the articles London, Bristol and South Wales Direct Railway, Bristol and South Wales Union Railway, Filton to Avonmouth Line, and Patchway railway station)

By the second half of the 20th century the southern part of the site was being used as a rail connected spoil heap; this use continued up to the 21st century. The site was involved in processing of used railway ballast, and from 1998 non-railway rubble was also processed.

A small stream, Stoke Brook, as well as tributaries and other drains crossed the site; it was redirected in the latter part of the 20th century, and by the 21st century had been mostly culverted.

In 2009 Agility Trains was named as the preferred bidder for the Intercity Express Programme train procurement. After being placed on hold and put under review the decision to continue with procurement process was taken in May 2011.

=== Intercity Express Programme depot ===
In mid 2011 Hitachi Rail Europe began the formal application process with South Gloucestershire Council for the construction of a rail depot at the 'Stoke Gifford Triangle'. In September 2011 a planning application was submitted; as specified, the depot was designed for a maximum train length of around 270 m (890 ft) (10 car, 26m carriage trains) with stabling for 17 trains. (Note: Design provision to a maximum of 40 five car (26m) trains, and ten 8 car trains.) The maintenance building was a two road 281.2 by 21 m (923 by 69 ft) structure including staff and office buildings, other facilities included a train washing building 43.5 by 7.6 m (143 by 25 ft), a wheel lathe building 54.7 by 12.4 m (179 by 41 ft), a two-floor accommodation building 9.9 by 3.6 m (32 by 12 ft) as well as smaller structures including pump rooms (fuel, oil, waste water), and a shunters' cabin. Other structures included electricity substations, and tank farms. The entire site's working track was to have overhead line electrification.

Rail access to the site was to be via connections in the south-east corner to the Stoke Gifford junction to Patchway junction chord of the South Wales Main Line, (Note: In Indigo Planning Ltd. & Jacobs Engineering Group Inc. 2011 the line is referred to as the South Wales and Bristol Down Tunnel line.) and to the Avonmouth and Filton Line; a connection in the northwest corner to the Stoke Gifford/Patchway junction chord is also proposed.

Significant local opposition developed to the plan, including concerns about noise pollution and light pollution during night shift working, as well as concerns about a negative effect on house prices. Stoke Gifford parish council also opposed the plans.

South Gloucestershire Council approved the plan in February 2012. Construction by VolkerFitzpatrick commenced in August 2013.

In 2013 the plans were amended by application No. PT13/1744/RVC. Minor operational changes were made: the carriage wash was moved to be adjacent to the main maintenance building, and was ~15m longer than originally stated; stabling sidings was reduced to 16; positions of plant and track layout were altered, for operational reasons, also reducing the proximity of work activities to nearby residential properties; screening earthworks and access roads were also altered. Due to the presence of biological lifeforms on the site the developers have proposed the rail bounded triangle of land to the south of the site as an environmental mitigation area.

Control of the site was transferred from Network Rail to Hitachi in early 2013. The depot was completed in March 2016 and became operational with the first visit by a Class 800 in summer 2016. Regular operations commenced in October 2017 when the Class 800s entered service with Great Western Railway.

== See also ==
- Great Western Main Line upgrade
