= GMTV News (South) =

Television news service

- Genre: Regional News
- Countries of origin: England, United Kingdom: Southern England (including the Thames Valley)
- Original language: English

Production
- Production locations: Whiteley, Hampshire
- Running time: 3-5 minutes
- Production company: ITV Meridian

Original release
- Network: GMTV (ITV Thames Valley)
- Release: 5 December 2006 – 6 February 2009

Related
- Meridian News, Thames Valley Today

GMTV News is the brand name for the regional news service in the south coast of England and the Thames Valley, from 5 December 2006 until 6 February 2009.

The change in branding was brought about due to the launch of ITV's Thames Valley news region on 4 December 2006, which, although based at Meridian's studios, consisted of the south-east of the Central franchise area as well as the north of the Meridian area.

For this reason it was unlike the GMTV Northern Ireland and GMTV Scotland services, as it was produced by an ITV regional franchise-holder, rather than an independent company.

As GMTV at the time only paid for one regional news service per official franchisee, the regional GMTV News-branded service was a replacement for the Meridian News and Thames Valley Today programmes. In February 2009, the two programmes were merged into one Meridian News/Tonight programme, and the GMTV News brand was dropped.
