= British Rail Class 801 =

Electric multiple unit train

British Rail Class 801 Azuma
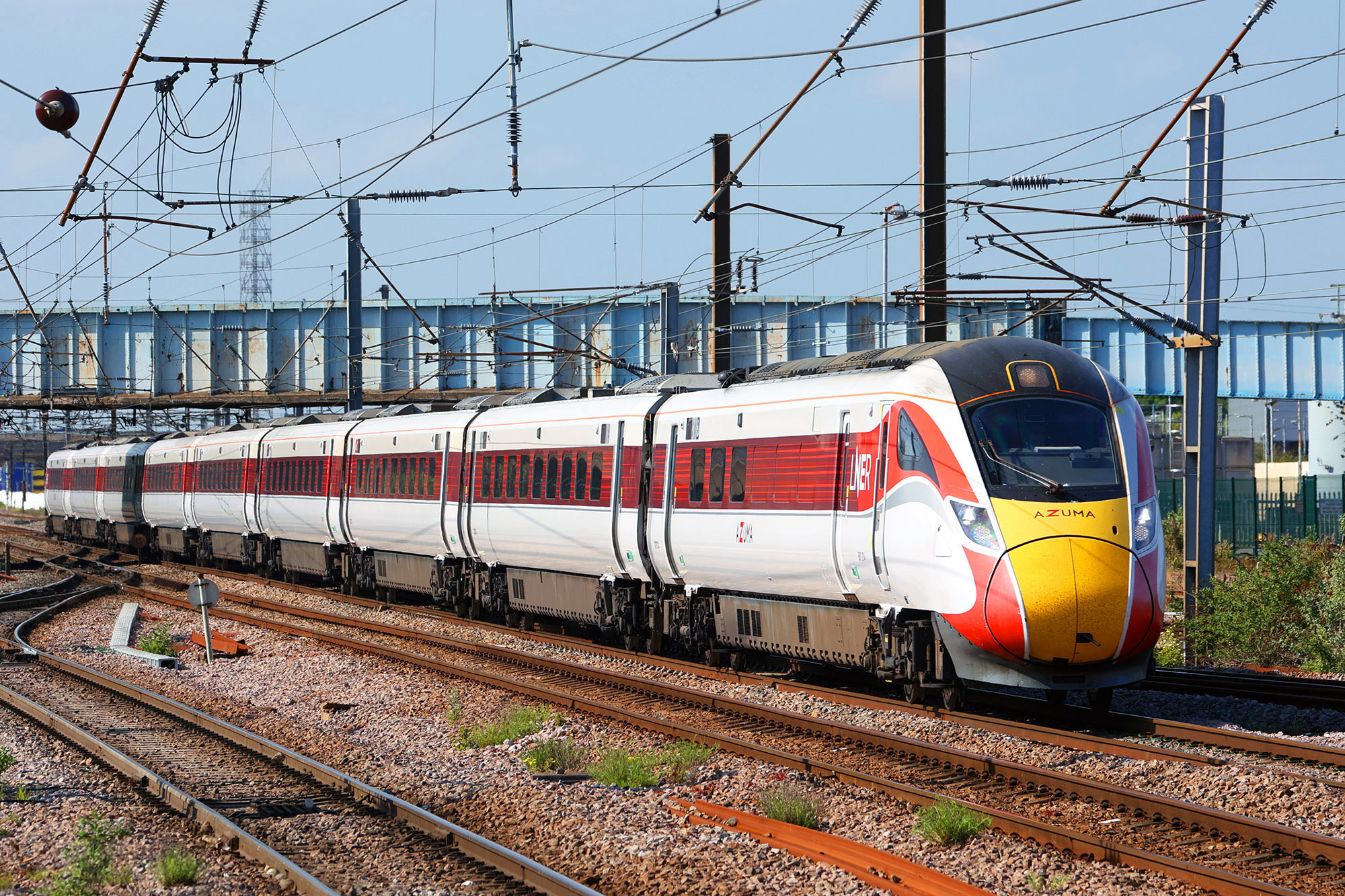
- LNER Class 801 unit passing through Peterborough

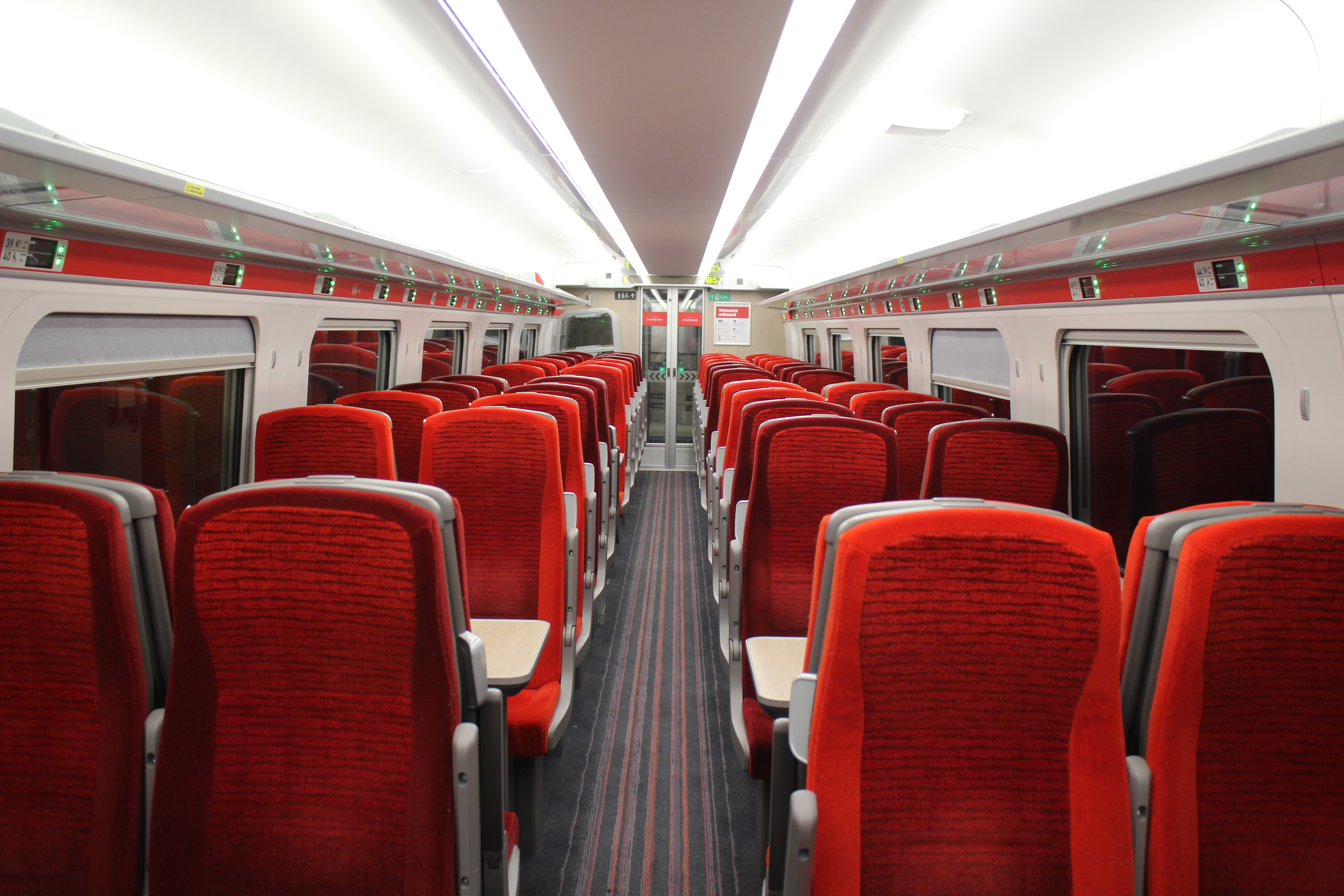
- LNER Class 801 standard-class saloon
- Stock type: Electric multiple unit
- In service: 16 September 2019–present
- Manufacturer: Hitachi Rail
- Built at: Kasado Works, Kudamatsu, Japan; Newton Aycliffe Manufacturing Facility, England
- Family name: AT300
- Replaced: InterCity 225
- Constructed: 2017–2020
- Number built: 12 × 801/1; 30 × 801/2
- Number in service: 42
- Formation: 5 cars per 801/1 unit: DPTS-MS-MS-MC-DPTF; 9 cars per 801/2 unit: DPTS-MS-MS-TS-MS-TS-MC-MF-DPTF
- Fleet numbers: 801/1: 801101–801112; 801/2: 801201–801230
- Capacity: 801/1: 302 seats (48 first class, 254 standard); 801/2: 596 seats (102 first class, 494 standard)
- Owner: Agility Trains
- Operator: London North Eastern Railway
- Depots: Bounds Green; Craigentinny; Doncaster Carr; Neville Hill
- Line served: East Coast Main Line

Specifications
- Car body construction: Aluminium
- Train length: 801/1: 129.7 m (425 ft 6 in); 801/2: 233.7 m (766 ft 9 in)
- Car length: Driving vehicles:25.850 m (84 ft 9.7 in); Intermediate vehicles: 26.000 m (85 ft 3.6 in)
- Width: 2.7 m (8 ft 10 in)
- Doors: Single-leaf pocket sliding; (2 per side per car)
- Maximum speed: 125 mph (200 km/h)
- Weight: 5-car units: 233 tonnes (229 long tons; 257 short tons); 9-car units: 420 tonnes (410 long tons; 460 short tons)
- Traction system: Hitachi IGBT
- Prime mover: 1 × MTU 12V 1600 R80L (emergency use only)
- Engine type: V12 four-stroke turbo-diesel with SCR
- Displacement: 21 L (1,284 cu in)
- Power output: Engine: 560 kW (750 hp); Electric: 226 kW (303 hp) per motor
- Acceleration: 0.7 m/s^{2} (1.6 mph/s)
- Deceleration: Service: 1.0 m/s^{2} (2.2 mph/s); Emergency: 1.2 m/s^{2} (2.7 mph/s)
- Electric system: 25 kV 50 Hz AC overhead
- Current collection: Pantograph
- UIC classification: 5-car units: 2′2′+Bo′Bo′+Bo′Bo′+Bo′Bo′+2′2′; 9-car units: 2′2′+Bo′Bo′+Bo′Bo′+2′2′+Bo′Bo′+2′2′+Bo′Bo′+Bo′Bo′+2′2′
- Wheels driven: 5-car unit: 12; 9-car unit: 20
- Braking systems: Electro-pneumatic (disc) and regenerative
- Safety systems: AWS; ETCS; TPWS
- Coupling system: Dellner 10
- Multiple working: Within class and classes 800 and 802
- Track gauge: 1,435 mm (4 ft 8 1/2 in) standard gauge

The British Rail Class 801 Azuma is a class of electric multiple unit (EMU) built by Hitachi Rail for London North Eastern Railway. The units have been built since 2017 at Hitachi's Newton Aycliffe Manufacturing Facility and have been used on services on the East Coast Main Line since 16 September 2019. As part of its production, the Class 801 units were ordered as part of the Intercity Express Programme and are in the Hitachi AT300 product family, alongside the closely related Class 800 units. LNER have branded the units as the Azuma, just like on their Class 800 units.

== Background and design ==
Five-car Class 801/1 at Northallerton

As part of the UK Government's Intercity Express Programme, the Class 801 units were to be built as replacements for the InterCity 125 and InterCity 225 sets which were the main trains used for services on the Great Western Main Line (GWML) and the East Coast Main Line (ECML) at the time. Differing from the Class 800 units, which they were built alongside, the Class 801 units were designed as purely electric multiple units, but with one diesel engine fitted to a single coach of each unit for emergency use. The Class 801 units were to enter service for both Great Western Railway and London North Eastern Railway but due to delays in the electrification of the GWML, it was announced in June 2016 that 21 nine-car (801/0) sets that were going to enter service with GWR would instead be converted to bi-modal operation. As a consequence, all of these sets were re-classified as 800/3 units and the Class 801 units only see operation on the ECML. However, GWR do have the option to convert all of their Class 800 units to electric-only operation by removal of the diesel engines should it be exercised, in which case they would be re-classified as a Class 801 unit.

== Operations ==
Video of LNER Azuma 801 229 passing through Peterborough station, on the Down Fast line between platforms 3 and 4 (seen from the latter) at speed, in September 2026

The first service to be operated with Class 801 units ran on 16 September 2019, with a pair of 801/1 five-car units operating several services between Leeds and London King's Cross, as well as one return trip between King's Cross and Newark Northgate. Three further pairs of five-car units entered service through the rest of September.

The nine-car Class 801/2 units were introduced on 18 November 2019, between King's Cross and Edinburgh. This allowed a cascade of Class 800/1 units onto services between King's Cross and Aberdeen, which in turn allowed LNER to withdraw its InterCity 125 sets from that route.

== Fleet details ==
| Subclass | Operator | Qty. | Year built | Cars per unit | Unit nos. |
|---|---|---|---|---|---|
| 801/1 Azuma | London North Eastern Railway | 12 | 2017–2020 | 5 | 801101–801112 |
| 801/2 Azuma | London North Eastern Railway | 30 | 2017–2020 | 9 | 801201–801230 |

=== Illustrations ===
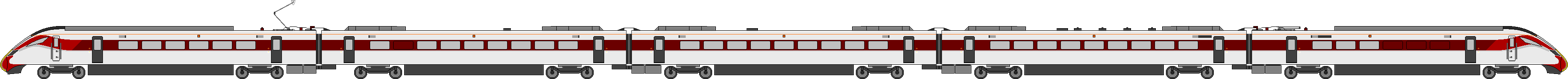
Illustration of a LNER Class 801/1 Azuma
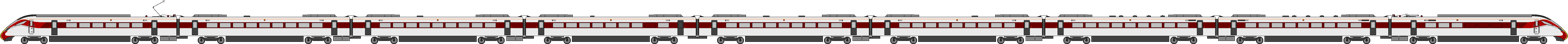
Illustration of a LNER Class 801/2 Azuma

=== Named units ===
| Unit number | Date | Photo | Name | Notes | Ref. |
|---|---|---|---|---|---|
| 801204 | 22 September 2024 | | Our Planet | Named for sustainability commitments. The livery was applied using a partially biological material, the first of its kind in the UK. | |
| 801205 | 27 March 2025 | | She's electric | Unveiled ahead of Oasis' return to the stage in London. Passengers on the inaugural service could win limited-edition bucket hats and T-shirts and were greeted by the tribute band 'Oasiz' on arrival into King's Cross | |
| 801207 | 14 January 2025 | | Darlington | Unveiled to mark 200 years since the first passenger journey on the world-famous Stockton and Darlington Railway. | |
| 801214 | 2 November 2026 | | Remember | Unveiled ahead of Remembrance Day 2026 | |
| 801224 | 19 May 2025 | | Bradford 2025 – UK City of Culture | Unveiled to mark the official opening of Platform 0 at Bradford Forster Square and to celebrate Bradford becoming the UK City of Culture. | |
| 801225 | 13 February 2024 | | Eleanor | Named after the company's new mascot as part of an advertising campaign. | |
| 801226 | 1 June 2023 | | Together | Pride livery: different pride flags around the windows on each carriage | |
| 801228 | 15 May 2023 to 18 June 2026 | | Century | Unveiled to mark 100 years since the creation of the London and North Eastern Railway | |
| 801228 | 19 June 2026 | | Gresley 150 | Unveiled to commemorate Sir Nigel Gresley's 150th birthday | |
