= Reading to Plymouth Line =

Reading to Plymouth line may refer to:

- Reading to Taunton line
- Bristol to Exeter line
- Exeter to Plymouth line
