= Doncaster International Railport =

Rail terminal in South Yorkshire, England

Coordinates: 53.50676°N 1.12535°W

Doncaster International Railport, sometimes referred to as Doncaster Europort is a 12 acres (5 ha) intermodal rail terminal in Doncaster, England, located on the East Coast Main Line close to the M18 motorway and its junction with the A1(M) road. It was built in 1995 as part of a 26 acres (11 ha) development site originally known as Direct for Europe Doncaster.

== History ==
At the end of the 19th century the site of the Doncaster railport was primarily in agricultural use; to the south the Great Northern Railway (GNR) main line that had been built during the 1850s, and to the west of the site a large engine shed (Doncaster Carr shed) was constructed for the GNR in the 1870s; a small engine shed was built at the north-western corner of the site in the later part of the 19th century (Note: The London and North Western Railway built an engine shed at Doncaster (east of the GNR's Doncaster Carr shed) after obtaining running powers on the GNR. (See also Great Northern and London and North Western Joint Railway)) (extant until the 1970s). During the 20th century the area was increasingly taken into railway use, mainly sidings (Decoy Sidings).

In 1989 after the passing of the Channel Tunnel Act 1987 Doncaster was put forward as a site for a rail terminal for Channel Tunnel freight. The site was promoted by Neil Worthington (Doncaster Metropolitan Borough Council) and backed by Mabon, subsidiary of Dutch company Hollandsche Beton Groep, and Kyle Stewart Properties. Initial expectations were for over 200,000 t of cargo per annum, and create 150 jobs directly. In June 1992 Kyle Stuart was awarded the contract to develop the terminal – in addition to the rail terminal up to 100,000 m^{2} (120,000 sq yd) of factory/warehousing space had been given planning permission.

In 1994 construction began on the £5 million Direct for Europe project; the terminal was one of several built to serve expected international freight trains resulting from the opening of the Channel Tunnel in 1994. (Note: Others were the Hams Hall Channel Tunnel Freight Terminal, Daventry International Rail Freight Terminal, and Wakefield Europort)

The 8.2 acres (3.3 ha) railport was opened in December 1995 by The Princess Royal; it was equipped with two reception sidings and four terminal sidings and capable of handling train lengths of 750 metres (2,460 ft); and was built with car handling and storage facilities. the site was built close to extensive marshalling sidings. As a Channel Tunnel freight terminal it was built with additional security measures to comply with the Channel Tunnel Security Order of 1994.

The rail site was operated by Applied Distribution Ltd.; in 1996/7 Tibbett and Britten acquired the rail terminal operation business.

In the late 1990s the site was handling about 12,500 containers per year, including a plastic polymer flow from ICI Wilton (Teesside) to the DuPont fibre plant in Doncaster, and intermodal traffic via seaports, but with little Channel tunnel trade. Trains were operated by Freightliner and EWS. GB Railfreight began running a service from the Port of Felixstowe in 2006.

In 2008 Freightliner took over running of the rail terminal from Tibbett & Britain successor DHL Supply Chain; by 2008 the terminal had increased its throughput to 37,000 containers per year.
