= ITV Thames Valley =

Former ITV news region

- Type: News region of television network
- Branding: ITV1
- Country: United Kingdom
- First air date: 4 December 2006; 18 years ago
- TV transmitters: Hannington, Oxford
- Headquarters: Whiteley, Hampshire Meridian's studios Abingdon, Oxfordshire
- Broadcast area: Thames Valley
- Owner: ITV plc
- Dissolved: 8 February 2009; 16 years ago (after 2 years, 66 days)
- Picture format: 16:9 576i
- Affiliation: ITV
- Language: English
- Replaced: ITV Meridian (North); ITV Central (South)
- Replaced by: ITV Meridian (Thames Valley)

ITV Thames Valley was a non-franchise ITV news region covering the Thames Valley area of the United Kingdom from 4 December 2006 until 8 February 2009. Owned and operated by ITV plc, it served the south/south-eastern area of the legal Central franchise and the north/north-western area of the legal Meridian franchise. In its first year, its flagship news programme Thames Valley Tonight won the Royal Television Society's Southern Centre Award for News Magazine Programme of the Year for its coverage of the 2007 summer floods.

The service began broadcasting 4 December 2006 merging the news assets of the two former sub-regions, and its newsrooms were officially opened on 26 January 2007 by ITV executive chairman, Michael Grade.

== Launch ==
Initially, ITV Thames Valley was to be launched on 4 November 2006. However, due to transmitter realignment, the date was finally set to 4 December; four weeks later than planned. It was expected the merging of the two sub-regions was originally expected to make over 40 workers redundant in editorial and production positions in Central South due to the favouring of Meridian's Whiteley base for production. However this number was reduced to around 10 by re-organisation of staffing roles. Central South's old newsroom at Abingdon was retained as the main newsgathering base for ITV Thames Valley.

The launch was successful in ratings terms. Although initially, ITV Thames Valley's flagship news programme, Thames Valley Tonight, received some minor criticism by viewers due to its lack of locality of news items in some areas due to the much larger geographical coverage area compared to its sub-regional predecessors.

Central and Meridian are both owned by ITV plc, which holds all the ITV franchise licences in England and Wales, so this change amounts simply to an internal organisation. Meridian classed the ITV Thames Valley service as "a third semi-independent sub-region for the Thames Valley", and stated its headquarters were in Abingdon. The service was known to be branded as both "ITV Thames Valley" and also "Meridian Thames Valley".

=== Merger with Meridian ===
In June 2007, ITV plc executive chairman Michael Grade hinted at a possible re-structure of the ITV regional layout, stating the existence of smaller regional services "no longer makes sense" relative to the regional audience they serve.

The move was expected to give ITV plc "greater value for money", however would be subject to Ofcom approval.

The plan was confirmed in September 2007, and would reduce the number of regional news programmes from 17 to just 9 in early 2009, saving around £35 to £40 million each year. Under these proposals, all sub-regions, including Thames Valley, were axed for larger regions only. ITV Thames Valley's service merged with Meridian, enabling a single live regional news programme to cover the whole of the Meridian franchise area (including the ex-Central part of the ITV Thames Valley patch), with recorded opt-outs for sub-regional news.

The last broadcast date of the main weekday evening edition of Thames Valley Tonight was on Friday 6 February 2009 with the very last Thames Valley news bulletin broadcast on Sunday 8 February 2009. The main presenters of the pan-regional successor service were Fred Dinenage and Sangeeta Barbra, both of Meridian.

A reduced Thames Valley service was reinstated in September 2013 as part of an expansion of sub-regional news services on ITV. The area now receives a ten-minute opt out within the 6pm edition of ITV News Meridian for the South of England and a full late night bulletin after News at Ten on weeknights.

== Sub-regions ==
The ITV Thames Valley news-gathering area itself was divided into two distinct north/south sub-regions for advertising and non-news regional programming only, on the ITV1 service:

- Thames Valley North (Ex-Central South): Carried Central's non-news regional programmes with the Thames Valley Tonight news programme
- Thames Valley South (Ex-Meridian North): Carried Meridian's non-news regional programmes with the Thames Valley Tonight news programme

== Regional area changes ==
No legal franchise area boundaries were altered between Central and Meridian; only the visual appearance of the service has changed. ITV Thames Valley was not perceived as a legal Channel 3 entity with regulator Ofcom. However, as a consequence of the changes, the ITV contractor for the West of England, ITV West, was unofficially extended to cover the Gloucester and Cheltenham areas, previously served by Central South. This was achieved by an additional set of aerials fitted on the Ridge Hill transmitter broadcasting ITV West on analogue UHF 30 alongside Central West on UHF 25. However, the DTT coverage of Multiplex 2 from the transmitter (which contains the regional ITV service), will not be altered to accommodate these changes, and will solely broadcast the West subregion of Central. This complication will be resolved with digital switchover; and until then, both regions available from the Ridge Hill transmitter will provide regional news for Gloucester and Cheltenham. However, as the Ridge Hill transmitter will continue to broadcast Central, the digital switchover date for that transmitter will be unaffected, switching with the rest of the Central region in 2011, despite the fact it also carries ITV West which should be switching a year earlier.

The BBC made no changes to its regional service supplied by the Ridge Hill, Oxford or Hannington transmitters.

== Programming ==
All programming for the ITV Thames Valley region was produced from Meridian's Whiteley studios, with Central South's Abingdon base retained as a newsgathering centre only. ITV Thames Valley did not produce any non-news programming; the north of the region continued to receive Central's non-news regional programmes (as that was the ITV franchisee) and the south continued to receive Meridian's.

Following a selection process involving Central South and Meridian West staff, Robin Britton was appointed Head of News for ITV Thames Valley.

The News Executive team included:

- Producer: Kim Hewitt
- News editor: Jim Stevens
- Features producer: Reshma Rumsey
- Forward planning: Kate Taylor
- Newsroom Journalist:Gaggan Sabherwal
- Assistant producer: Janet Hayman
- Technical co-ordinator: Steve Atkey
- Graphic designer: Blue Hall
- Output producers: Caroline Asker and Caroline Ferguson
- Programme presenters: Mary Green, Hannah Shellswell and Wesley Smith
- Sports presenters Chris Maugahan, Victoria Bennett and David Reilly
- Studio director: Keith Peries

The service did not extend to breakfast bulletins (i.e. during GMTV), however, viewers received "GMTV News" at this time, which was a service covering the Thames Valley and the rest of the Meridian franchise area. ITV Thames Valley did however have its own weekend bulletins.

== Timeline ==
Area	until 2006	2006–2009	2009–2013	from 2014
Midlands	ITV Central	ITV Central		
Oxfordshire (Thames Valley North)	ITV Central	Franchise: ITV Central		ITV Meridian
Oxfordshire (Thames Valley North)	ITV Central	News: ITV Thames Valley	News: ITV Meridian	ITV Meridian
Berkshire, northern Hampshire (Thames Valley South)	ITV Meridian	News: ITV Thames Valley	ITV Meridian	ITV Meridian
Berkshire, northern Hampshire (Thames Valley South)	ITV Meridian	Franchise: ITV Meridian	ITV Meridian	ITV Meridian
South and South East England	ITV Meridian	ITV Meridian	ITV Meridian	ITV Meridian

ITV regional branding
Preceded by ITV Central	Oxfordshire; 4 December 2006 – 8 February 2009 (on-air brand only)	Succeeded by ITV Meridian
Preceded by ITV Meridian	Berkshire & northern Hampshire; 4 December 2006 – 8 February 2009 (on-air brand only)	Succeeded by ITV Meridian
