= Thames Valley Tonight =

British regional television news programme

- Also known as: Thames Valley Today
- Genre: Regional News
- Starring: Mary Green; Wesley Smith
- Country of origin: United Kingdom

Production
- Producers: ITV Thames Valley (Central/Meridian)

Original release
- Network: Central (South), Meridian (West)
- Release: 4 December 2006 – 8 February 2009

Related
- ITV News Central, ITV News Meridian

Thames Valley Tonight is a regional news programme broadcast to part of the ITV Network in the Thames Valley area of southern England. The Thames Valley news region was launched on Monday 4 December 2006 and ceased to exist on 8 February 2009.

Like all regional news programmes on ITV1 in England and Wales and ITV Channel Television, it used the generic ITV font and idents.

== History ==
The region was created by a merger between Meridian West and Central South's regional news services, and broadcast to the Meridian West sub-region from the Hannington transmitter, and the Central South sub-region from the Oxford transmitter. The Thames Valley operation covered Berkshire, Buckinghamshire (west including Aylesbury), Hampshire (north of and including Winchester), Oxfordshire, Surrey (west and including Camberley) and Wiltshire (east and including Swindon). In all the population of the patch was around 3 million people.

The main presenters were Mary Green and Wesley Smith (with Hannah Shellswell co-presenting with Smith on Fridays). Chris Maughan, Victoria Bennett and David Reilly presented the Sports News, either in the studio or from the newsroom. While the newsgathering arm of the operation was based at the old Central South location at Abingdon in Oxfordshire, the presentation studio (formerly used for Meridian West) was based at Meridian's headquarters in Whiteley, Hampshire. Bureaux offices were located at Swindon, Reading and Westminster. The view projected on to the screen behind the newsreaders was of the Oracle Shopping Centre in Reading, chosen presumably as the town lay in the heart of the new region – previously it sat in an overlap of the now replaced Central South and Meridian West sub-regions – therefore avoiding accusations of favouritism towards one side or the other.

In just over two years on air, Thames Valley Tonight won a number of awards, including the RTS Southern Centre 'Programme of the Year' Award in 2007 for coverage of the summer floods and the 2008 EDF News Programme of the Year Award for its coverage of the opening of Terminal 5 at Heathrow Airport.

== Merger ==
On 12 September 2007, it was reported that ITV plc boss Michael Grade wanted to cut down its number of regional newsrooms from seventeen to nine by merging some services, which could save between £35m and £40m per year. This would involve combining the Meridian and Thames Valley regions. In the Thames Valley, the merger would signal the end of Thames Valley Tonight/Thames Valley Today and would be replaced by a pan-regional edition of Meridian Tonight. The current Thames Valley region would be merged with the Meridian South sub-region for opt-outs within the main weekday programme, a late night bulletin and localised weather forecasts.

Robin Britton, previously Head of News for ITV Thames Valley and Regional Editor for Meridian West, was subsequently appointed Head of News for the new operation.

The final main edition of Thames Valley Tonight was broadcast on Friday 6 February 2009. The last Thames Valley news bulletin was broadcast at 6.10 pm on Sunday 8 February 2009.

In September 2013, a Thames Valley service was reintroduced by ITV News Meridian in the form of a ten-minute opt out during the 6 pm programme and a full late night bulletin after ITV News at Ten on weekdays.

== Former on air team ==
- Victoria Bennett
- Sally Biddulph (née Mules, now with ITV News)
- Andrea Byrne (now with ITV News and ITV News Cymru Wales)
- Martyn Davies (emigrated to Australia)
- Juliette Fletcher (freelance with ITV News Meridian)
- Mary Green (now with BBC Radio Berkshire)
- Gemma Humphries
- Gillian Kelly
- Mark Lipscomb
- Chris Maughan (continues with ITV News Meridian)
- Simon Parkin
- David Reilly
- Reshma Rumsey
- Hannah Shellswell (née Stewart-Jones)
- Wesley Smith (freelance journalist)

== Production Team ==
Head of News
Robin Britton

Producer
Kim Hewitt

Output Producers
Caroline Asker
Caroline Ferguson
Natalie Kenny
Emma Pyne

Assistant Producer
Janet Hayman

News Editor
Jim Stevens

Features Producer
Reshma Rumsey

Forward Planning Editor
Kate Taylor

Studio Directors
Keith Peries
James Tee

Technical Co-ordinator
Steve Atkey

Graphic Designer
Amanda Hall
