= Craigentinny Train Maintenance Centre =

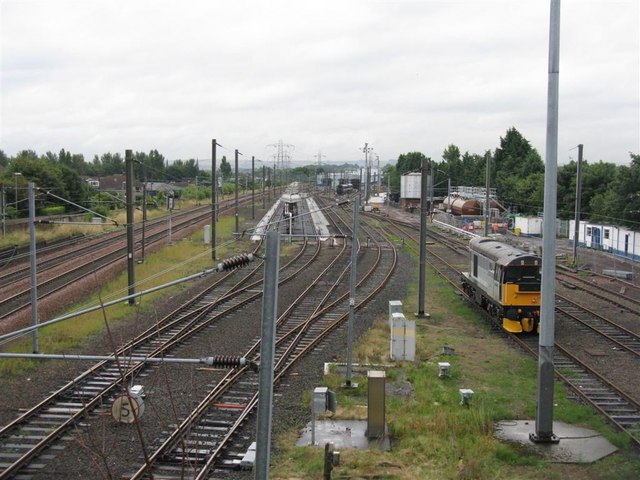
- Craigentinny T&R.S.M.D
- Interactive map of Craigentinny Train Maintenance Centre

Location
- Location: Craigentinny, Edinburgh, Scotland
- Coordinates: 55.9527°N 3.1259°W
- OS grid: NT297738

Characteristics
- Owner: Network Rail
- Operator: Hitachi Rail
- Depot code: EC (1973-)
- Type: HST; DMU; EMU

History
- Opened: 1904

Craigentinny Train Maintenance Centre is a railway depot in the Craigentinny area of Edinburgh, Scotland. The depot is operated by Hitachi Rail with a depot code of EC.

== History ==
The depot opened in 1904, as a carriage sidings and was home to InterCity 125 HSTs operated by London North Eastern Railway until 31 December 2019, and CrossCountry InterCity 125 HSTs until September 2023. It currently services Class 220/221 Voyagers for CrossCountry and Class 397s for TransPennine Express. Hitachi Rail now undertakes maintenance on London North Eastern Railway Class 800s and 801s, ScotRail Class 385s, TransPennine Express Class 802s and Lumo Class 803s. It also maintains Class 73s for the Caledonian Sleeper.

On 11 November 2018, Hitachi Rail took over the operation of Craigentinny Depot from London North Eastern Railway.

== Facilities ==
The site comprises three maintenance sheds, two of which are supplied with 25,000 volt overhead wires, and a smaller repair shed for shorter trains and locomotives. There are a number of storage and stabling sidings which are not covered.

Craigentinny also operates a wheel lathe at its Portobello Edinburgh site which turns out tyre damage on rail vehicle wheels for many rail operators.
