= Agility Trains =

British railway company

- Type: Private
- Founded: 2008
- Headquarters: London, England
- Website: www.agilitytrains.com

Agility Trains is a consortium that currently comprises the Japanese rolling stock manufacturer Hitachi, multinational insurance and investment company Axa UK, and the infrastructure fund GLIL Infrastructure.

The consortium, which originally comprised the Japanese rolling stock manufacturer Hitachi and the British infrastructure specialist John Laing, was created in June 2008 to collectively bid for the Department for Transport's Intercity Express Programme (IEP), which sought to procure a new fleet of high speed trains, initially to replace the aging InterCity 125. The consortium's bid was centered around the Class 800 and 801 high speed trains, which provided more seats, reduced journey times, and superior environmental performance than the Intercity 125 sets.

The bid submitted by the consortium was successful, leading to the finalising of a £4.5bn contract in mid 2012 to produce and sustain trains for both the Great Western Main Line (GWML) and East Coast Main Line (ECML). Infrastructure built to fulfil the contract included a new manufacturing site at Hitachi Newton Aycliffe and multiple new depots to maintain the fleet. In October 2017, the first train went into service on the GWML.

== Activities ==
Agility Trains was formed in response to the Intercity Express Programme (IEP), launched by the Department for Transport (DfT) in 2005 with the initial goal of procuring a replacement for the aging Intercity 125 fleet on both the Great Western Main Line and East Coast Main Line.

During June 2008, three companies - the British infrastructure specialist John Laing Group, the Japanese rolling stock manufacturer Hitachi, and the British investment firm Barclays Private Equity- created the Agility Trains consortium for the purpose of jointly bidding for the contract to design, manufacture, and maintain a fleet of long-distance trains for the IEP. On 16 November 2007, the DfT issued an Invitation to Tender for the IEP to three shortlisted entities: Alstom-Barclays Rail Group; Express Rail Alliance (Bombardier, Siemens, Angel Trains and Babcock & Brown); and Agility Trains.

Shortly after Alstom's decision to withdraw from the bidding in February 2008, British investment firm Barclays Private Equity opted to re-enter the IEP on 26 June 2008, four days before the end of the bidding process, as a partner of Hitachi and John Laing, in Agility Trains. On 12 February 2009, the British Government announced that Agility Trains was the preferred bidder for the contract, with the Siemens-Bombardier consortia as reserve bidders. The value of the contract was then estimated at £7.5bn, including replacements for both Intercity 125 and Intercity 225 train sets.

The finalised £4.5bn contract for trains for the GWML and ECML was announced in July 2012. Assembly of most of the trains took place in the UK using Japanese-built body shells, with a new factory being established at Hitachi Newton Aycliffe. Additionally, new depots to maintain the new train fleet were also developed.

The first IEP train left the Kasado factory on 7 January 2015 for shipping via Kobe, In October 2017, the first train went into service on the Great Western Main Line. In May 2019, the first train entered service on the East Coast Main Line between London King's Cross and Leeds.

Several ownership changes took place during the late 2010s and early 2020s. in March 2018, Axa announced that it would purchase half of John Laing Group's shareholding in the consortium. In September 2020, John Laing Group announced that it was selling its remaining stake in Agility Trains to AIP Management in exchange for £421 million in cash. In November 2021, GLIL Infrastructure purchased a 30% stake in Agility Trains from Hitachi; as a result, Hitachi's stake dropped to 40 percent while GLIL and AIP owning a 30% stake each.
