= ITV News Meridian =

- Also known as: Good Morning Meridian; Meridian Tonight (1993–2013); Meridian News (1993–2013)
- Genre: Regional news
- Directed by: Alison Nice (Head of News) > Kim Hewitt (Programme and Digital Editor)
- Presented by: Sangeeta Bhabra; Matt Teale
- Countries of origin: England, United Kingdom
- Original language: English

Production
- Production locations: Whiteley, Hampshire, England
- Camera setup: Multi-camera
- Running time: 29 minutes (18:00 broadcast)
- Production company: ITV Meridian

Original release
- Network: ITV1 (ITV Meridian)
- Release: 4 January 1993 – present

Related
- ITV News; ITV Weather; The Last Word; Coast to Coast (1982–1992)

ITV News Meridian is a British television news service broadcast and produced by ITV Meridian. The news service is produced and broadcast from ITV Meridian's studios in Whiteley, near Fareham with reporters also based at bureaux in Didcot, Brighton and Maidstone.

The service transmits to a coverage area across three sub-regions in the South and South East of England.

- South: serving central and eastern Dorset, the Isle of Wight, the majority of West Sussex, the Brighton & Hove coastal conurbation of East Sussex, southern Hampshire and southern Wiltshire and parts of Surrey.
- South East: serving East Sussex, Kent, southern Essex and parts of West Sussex and Surrey.
- Thames Valley: serving Berkshire, Oxfordshire, western and central Buckinghamshire, northern Hampshire, northern Wiltshire and parts of Surrey, Gloucestershire and Northamptonshire.

Freesat and Sky viewers in Brighton can receive either Meridian South or Meridian South East region on channel 103 as default via the depending postcode. This means that the city's news, sport and weather is covered by both sub-regional programmes.

Its main competitors are BBC South's main evening programme BBC South Today in the South and Thames Valley regions; and BBC South East's main evening programme BBC South East Today in the South East region.

The programme is currently EDF Programme of the Year for London and the South East (for coverage of the 70th anniversary of D-Day) and the Royal Television Society's Southern Centre Programme of the Year (for coverage of the Eastbourne Pier fire)

== History ==
=== January 1993 – December 2006 ===
Meridian's flagship regional news programme was launched as Meridian Tonight on 4 January 1993 – three days after Meridian replaced Television South.

Three sub-regional editions of the programme were broadcast simultaneously, from studios in Southampton, Maidstone, and Newbury. The three original sub-regional services for Meridian News/Tonight were:

- South, based in Southampton before moving to Whiteley in 2004.
- East (now South East), based in Maidstone before moving to an industrial estate near New Hythe in 1994. The news gathering operation was moved back to The Maidstone Studios in 2004, though studio production moved to Meridian's new Whiteley base at the same time.
- West (now Thames Valley), based in Newbury. Studio production moved to Southampton in 2001.

Meridian's first Controller of News was Jim Raven, who had previously been the Editor for the South East edition of TVS's Coast to Coast.

Three regional editors (later heads of news) were appointed to run each of the three news sub-regions:

- South: Andy Cooper, former editor of Coast to Coast South
- East: Mark Southgate, former producer of Coast to Coast South East
- West: Robin Britton, who had been the deputy-editor of the Meridian South programme. TVS had done a short Thames Valley opt, launched in 1990.

Meridian South went on air with Fred Dinenage (TVS & Southern) and Debbie Thrower (TVS & BBC), the South East anchors were Mike Debens (TVS) and Alison Holloway (Sky, HTV West) and in the Thames Valley, Andy Craig (Central) partnered with Mai Davies (TVS & HTV Wales). Carl Tyler did the weather for Thames Valley and South and Ron Lobeck was also retained for the South East forecasts.

Robin Britton recruited programme producer Paul Erlam and transport correspondent Mike Pearse (Thames News), along with Alison Black (Channel 4 Daily) and Peter Brookes (TV-am).

Andy Cooper hired Nick Myers from TV-am, and moved Steve McDonnell from current affairs at TVS back into the newsroom as a programme producer. Mark Southgate recruited journalist Marc Percy. The three new-look programmes were hosted from an original set design was by Eye-Catching Design.

All three editions of Meridian Tonight went onto win the Royal Television Society's Nations and Regions Programme of the Year award – the only time three programmes have tied for the top prize.

Presentation for all three services moved to new smaller digital studios at Whiteley, near Fareham on Saturday 4 December 2004. The Northam studios in Southampton were sold for a reported £5 million for domestic housing and the studios near Maidstone were closed. The Meridian team in the South East moved back to the Maidstone Studios originally built by TVS and rejected by Meridian when they took over. Newsgathering operations in all areas were retained.

In December 2006, the updates during GMTV became pan-regional. Weekend bulletins had become pan-regional across the South Coast and South East only, whilst the West retained its own weekend bulletins until 3 December 2006, when ITV Thames Valley was launched.

=== December 2006 – February 2009 ===
On 4 December 2006, a merger between West and the ITV Central South sub-region took place, forming the non-franchise ITV Thames Valley news service, broadcasting Thames Valley Today/Tonight from the same studio at Whiteley. The merger saw Buckinghamshire, Oxfordshire and the Swindon area being added to the region for news purposes. The former ITV Central South sub-region headquarters at Abingdon was retained as the main news gathering base for ITV Thames Valley, but the studio presentation facility was mothballed.

Bulletins during GMTV became pan-regional across the ITV Meridian and ITV Thames Valley areas, and branded as GMTV News. Weekend bulletins continued to be separate Meridian News (pan-regional for South Coast and South East) and Thames Valley Today/Tonight services.

=== February 2009 – September 2013 ===
At the end of 2008, in light of a restructuring through the ITV regional news network, around 100 staff across the three sub-regional news services in South East England were made redundant. A single edition of Meridian Tonight for the entire region was launched on 9 February 2009. Within this, two sub-regions created – South/Thames Valley and South East.

The then remaining sub-regional elements were:

- The opening 15 minutes of the main 6pm programme.
- Full late night bulletins on weeknights, following ITV News at Ten.
- Localised weather forecasts for South/Thames Valley and South East.

Sangeeta Bhabra and Fred Dinenage were lead presenters of the scaled back service. Both sub-regional editions use the same presenter(s) and studio/set, therefore one of the two opt-outs – depending on the day's news – is pre-recorded 'as live' shortly before broadcast.

In February 2010, the programme won the Royal Television Society's Award for Best Nations & Regions News Coverage. On Monday 14 January 2013, the news service was relaunched and rebranded as ITV News Meridian.

=== September 2013 – present ===
On 23 July 2013, proposals for a more localised Channel 3 news service were approved.

ITV News Meridian extended the South and South East opt-out services by an extra five minutes during the half-hour 6pm programme, in addition to separate lunchtime and weekend bulletins for the two regions.

A Thames Valley service was also reintroduced, consisting of a ten-minute opt out within the 6pm programme for the South and a late bulletin after News at Ten. The two late night bulletins are retained for the South and the South East, in addition to the new Thames Valley bulletin.

The expanded sub-regional service launched on Monday 16 September 2013. The Head of News was Robin Britton. He previously launched Thames Valley Tonight and the West edition of Meridian Tonight. In September 2017 he was replaced by Alison Nice, a former content editor for ITV Meridian.

== Notable current on air staff ==
- Sangeeta Bhabra
- Matt Teale

== Notable former on air staff ==
- Andrea Byrne
- Fred Dinenage
- Kate Garraway
- Charlotte Hawkins
- Gemma Humphries
- Natasha Kaplinsky
- Debbie Thrower
- Charlene White

== Graphics ==
Upon launch in 1993, Meridian decided that all three programmes would share the same titles, music and name. From launch until 14 July 1996, the programme titles featured a large translucent Meridian logo flipping over to reveal and yellow and blue map of the region. Accompanied by a trumpeted fanfare, the region lights up with several dots marking Meridian's news-gathering centres, and three pulses marking Southampton, Maidstone and Newbury – the locations of each of the three programmes. Each respective region would then zoom into their area, before the flipping logo reveals the programme name, separated by a horizontal line, at the end of the sequence.

The title sequence and music was changed on 15 July 1996 to a blue and gold background variant, featuring a partly obscured circle displaying news related imagery, before flipping to reveal the centre of the Meridian logo falling back into the centre of the line separating the programme name.

The look was changed again on 4 January 1999 with the new titles featuring a vibrant purple background being changed into yellows and reds to form the Meridian logo. The music remained the same, but was enhanced to be more dramatic with a voiceover at the beginning declaring "This is Meridian Tonight". The programme name now featured the Meridian logo above, or to the side of the programme name and appearing as a digital on-screen graphic in the bottom left corner of the screen throughout the programme. The last Meridian individual look was introduced on 4 February 2002 and featured two translucent halves of Meridian's logo merging and moving together against a purple backdrop. The end board of the sequence saw to two-halves move closer against a stripe of red and yellow colour against the Meridian Tonight name.

Following the merger of Granada plc and Carlton Communications in 2004 to form ITV plc, Meridian has used generic title sequences adopted across the ITV plc network of ITV stations. On 2 February 2004, this featured a blue and yellow look concentrating on vertical columns of translucent squares displaying images of the Meridian region, before ending with four square ITV logo over a map of the UK made out of squares. On 16 January 2006, this was altered following the change of ITV logo to a sequence showing footage of the region and ending with the name over a light blue and turquoise cylinder, and further altered on 15 December 2009 to match the new ITV News style. This latest style featured a yellow and translucent black colour scheme and again focusing on footage of locations within the region.

== See also ==
- ITV Central
- ITV Meridian
- ITV Thames Valley

Preceded by BBC Wales Today	RTS: Television Journalism; Regional Daily News Magazine (South edition); 2004	Succeeded by BBC Wales Today
Preceded by The West Tonight: Weston Pier Fire	RTS: Television Journalism; Nations and Regions News Coverage (Justice for Hannah – South edition); 2010	Succeeded by Spotlight: The Iris Robinson Investigation
