= List of British films of 2006 =

A list of British films released in 2006.

== 2006 ==
Title	Director	Cast	Genre	Notes
The Abandoned	Nacho Cerdà	Anastasia Hille, Karel Roden	Horror	Co-production with Spain
Alien Autopsy	Jonny Campbell	Ant & Dec, Jimmy Carr	Comedy	
Amazing Grace	Michael Apted	Ioan Gruffudd, Albert Finney	Biopic	
Antonio's Breakfast	Daniel Mulloy	George Irving	Short	Academy Award for Best Short
As You Like It	Kenneth Branagh	Romola Garai, Alfred Molina	Comedy	
Basic Instinct 2	Michael Caton-Jones	Sharon Stone, David Morrissey	Thriller	
Breaking and Entering	Anthony Minghella	Jude Law, Juliette Binoche	Romantic drama	
Cashback	Sean Ellis	Sean Biggerstaff, Emilia Fox	Drama	
Casino Royale	Martin Campbell	Daniel Craig, Eva Green, Mads Mikkelsen	Spy/action	Reboot of the James Bond franchise
Children of Men	Alfonso Cuarón	Julianne Moore, Clive Owen	Sci-fi	
A Cock and Bull Story	Michael Winterbottom	Steve Coogan, Rob Brydon, Keeley Hawes	Comedy	
Colour Me Kubrick	Michael Fitzgerald	John Malkovich, Richard E. Grant	Comedy	
Confetti	Debbie Isitt	Martin Freeman, Jessica Stevenson	Mockumentary	
Driving Lessons	Jeremy Brock	Julie Walters, Rupert Grint, Laura Linney	Comedy/drama	Entered into the 28th Moscow International Film Festival
Flushed Away	Sam Fell and David Bowers	Hugh Jackman, Kate Winslet, Ian McKellen	Animated	Co-production with USA
The Flying Scotsman	Douglas Mackinnon	Jonny Lee Miller, Laura Fraser	Sports	
A Good Year	Ridley Scott	Russell Crowe	Romantic comedy	Based on the novel A Good Year by Peter Mayle
Half Light	Craig Rosenberg	Demi Moore, Hans Matheson	Thriller	
The History Boys	Nicholas Hytner	Richard Griffiths, Domonic Cooper	Drama	
Kidulthood	Menhaj Huda	Aml Ameen, Adam Deacon, Femi Oyeniran	Drama	
The Kovak Box	Daniel Monzón	Timothy Hutton, Lucía Jiménez	Thriller	Co-production with Spain
The Last King of Scotland	Kevin Macdonald	Forest Whitaker, James McAvoy	Drama	Won Academy Award for Best Actor
London to Brighton	Paul Andrew Williams	Lorraine Stanley, Georgia Groome	Crime/drama	
Love and Other Disasters	Alek Keshishian	Brittany Murphy, Matthew Rhys, Catherine Tate	Comedy/romance	Co-production with France
Notes on a Scandal (film)	Richard Eyre	Judi Dench, Cate Blanchett	Drama	
Once	Glen Hansard, Marketa Irglova		Music/drama/romance	Won an Academy Award
Peter and the Wolf	Suzie Templeton		Animated short	Won Academy Award for Best Short Film (Animated)
Pierrepoint	Adrian Shergold	Timothy Spall, Juliet Stevenson	Drama	
Played	Sean Stanek	Val Kilmer, Mick Rossi	Crime	
The Queen	Stephen Frears	Helen Mirren, Michael Sheen	Drama	Winner of the Academy Award and Golden Globe for Best Actress and BAFTA for Best Film and Best Actress
Queer Duck: The Movie	Xeth Feinberg	Jim J. Bullock, Jackie Hoffman, Kevin Michael Richardson, Billy West, Maurice LaMarche, Jeff Bennett, Tim Curry, Conan O'Brien, David Duchovny	Animated	
Red Road	Andrea Arnold	Kate Dickie, Tony Curran, Martin Compston, Natalie Press	Thriller	Won the Jury Prize at the 2006 Cannes Film Festival
Scenes of a Sexual Nature	Ed Blum	Holly Aird, Eileen Atkins	Comedy/drama	
Scoop	Woody Allen	Woody Allen, Scarlett Johansson, Hugh Jackman, Ian McShane	Romantic comedy/mystery	
Severance	Christopher Smith	Danny Dyer, Laura Harris, Tim McInnerny	Comedy horror	British/German co-production
Starter for 10	Tom Vaughan	James McAvoy, Alice Eve, Rebecca Hall	Comedy drama	based on Starter for Ten by David Nicholls
Stormbreaker	Geoffrey Sax	Alex Pettyfer, Mickey Rourke	Adventure	
The Thief Lord	Richard Claus	Aaron Taylor-Johnson, Rollo Weeks, Vanessa Redgrave	Adventure	Co-production with Germany
Three	Stewart Raffill	Billy Zane, Kelly Brook	Drama	
Tirant lo Blanc	Vicente Aranda	Victoria Abril, Leonor Watling, Jane Asher	Adventure	Co-production with Italy and Spain
United 93	Paul Greengrass	J.J. Johnson, Gary Commock, Polly Adams	Drama	Winner of BAFTA for Best Director
Venus	Roger Michell	Peter O'Toole, Leslie Phillips	Drama	
Wild Country	Craig Strachan	Martin Compston, Peter Capaldi, Samantha Shields	Horror	
The Wind That Shakes the Barley	Ken Loach	Cillian Murphy, Padraic Delaney	War	
A Woman in Winter	Richard Jobson	Jamie Sives, Julie Gayet	Drama	
Rock-a-Snowy (PG-13) film	Chris Wedge	Anne Hathaway, John Goodman, Mike Myers	Animation	

== See also ==
- 2006 in film
- 2006 in British music
- 2006 in British radio
- 2006 in British television
- 2006 in the United Kingdom
- List of 2006 box office number-one films in the United Kingdom
