= 2006 in British television =

The following is a list of British television related events from the year 2006.

== Events ==
=== January ===
Date	Event
1 January	BBC One airs The Queen by Rolf, a documentary following artist Rolf Harris as he paints a portrait of the Queen.
2 January	BBC One airs the network premieres of Piglet's Big Movie and the Steven Spielberg smash-hit Catch Me If You Can.
3 January	Channel 4 quiz show Countdown celebrates its 4000th edition.
6 January	ITV debuts Soapstar Superstar, a singing talent contest in which soap actors compete to become series champion.
7 January	ITV's Saturday morning children's show MoM is relaunched under the new title of Holly & Stephen's Saturday Showdown.
9 January	Debut of the offbeat police drama Life on Mars on BBC One and ITV's pilot programme of Dancing on Ice.
14 January	Coronation Street actor Richard Fleeshman wins the first series of ITV's Soapstar Superstar.
14 January	Debut of ITV's Dancing on Ice.
15 January	The BBC announces details of Just the Two of Us, a singing contest following the Strictly Come Dancing format that will air in February and March. Vernon Kay and Tess Daly will present the series which will pair celebrities with professional singers, who will then compete to become series champion.
16 January	To coincide with the introduction of a new identity across ITV plc stations, UTV replaces its 2003 idents with a brand new set. The new idents featured newly recorded films shot across Northern Ireland, again in the form of panoramas. The landscape films used in these idents are updated in July 2007 and October 2008.
25 January	ITV1 airs the network television premiere of the 2003 film Johnny English starring Rowan Atkinson and Natalie Imbruglia. The film previously aired on Sky Movies in 2004.
27 January	Chantelle Houghton, a model from Essex, wins the fourth series of Celebrity Big Brother after entering the series as a "fake" celebrity. In order to remain as a contestant she was required to convince the other participants that she was a famous singer.
29 January	Debut of ITV's Inspector Morse spin-off Lewis.

=== February ===
Date	Event
8 February	Channel 4 confirms that its pay-per-view movie channel FilmFour will go Free-to-air from July, when it will launch on Freeview.
10 February	The events of the 2006 Winter Olympics start broadcasting on the BBC.
14 February	Coronation Street bosses defend their decision to film a storyline involving a car breaking down on Saddleworth Moor, scene of the 1960s Moors murders, saying the plot has nothing to do with the events that occurred there.
15 February	BBC One debuts Davina, a chat show presented by Davina McCall. Guests on the first edition include Charlotte Church, Tess Daly and Vernon Kay. The show proves to be a disaster, with The Guardian's Gareth Maclean noting that McCall "found herself floundering and foundering, struggling through [interviews], and exposing herself in a way from which even the hardiest flasher would recoil", while Jonathan Ross blames a poor guest line up. The 8 March edition gives BBC One its worst ever peak time ratings of 2.75 million. By the time the show ends on 12 April ratings have fallen to below 2.5 million. It is axed shortly afterwards.
19 February	Channel 4 airs the penultimate and final episode of Gene Simmons' Rock School where the band Hoax UK (formerly No Comment) opened for Judas Priest at Long Beach Arena. Members included the late Lil' Chris, Ellie Chapman, Samanie Warren-Close, Sammi Reeve, Lindsey Rose, Jess Reid and others.
23 February	Just the Two of Us debuts on BBC One.
26 February	The events of the 2006 Winter Olympics end broadcasting on the BBC.
28 February	L!VE TV is moved to the adult section of Sky's EPG, and is rebranded as "Babeworld" two days later. This is because the channel has moved to broadcasting an increasingly adult themed content.

=== March ===
Date	Event
2 March	Charlie Brooker's ...wipe series debuts on BBC Four, starting with the first episode of Screenwipe which is still a rival to ITV's Harry Hill's TV Burp.
4 March	BBC Two shows the network television premiere of Anita and Me, a coming of age drama based on the book of the same name by Meera Syal.
4 March	Actress Gaynor Faye and professional skating partner Daniel Whiston win the first series of Dancing on ice.
4 March	Tony Blair becomes the first serving prime minister to be interviewed by Michael Parkinson on his chat show. Blair volunteers the information that he believes he will be judged by God for the Iraq War.
5 March	Siân Reeves and Russell Watson win the first series of Just the Two of Us.
11 March	Dick & Dom in da Bungalow comes to an end after four years on CBBC.
11 March	ITV launches a CITV channel, which broadcasts during the downtime hours of ITV4, replacing the ITV News Channel.
18 March	Christopher Napier, performing as George Formby, wins the fourth and final junior series of Stars in Their Eyes. The programme continues with a number of special editions during 2006, before a final celebrity special on 23 December.
19 March	American period sitcom television series Everybody Hates Chris debuts on Five.
23 March	Coronation Street bosses dismiss as untrue media reports that the child actress who plays Amy Barlow is being replaced because her parents felt her storylines were "too harrowing", and her workload too heavy.
24 March	ITV announces plans to air World of Chat, a show on ITV2 featuring the best from chat shows around the world.
25–26 March	UKTV Gold presents its Mitchells Weekend to coincide with the return of Grant Mitchell (Ross Kemp) to EastEnders. The weekend includes The Mitchells – The Full Story, a documentary about the soap family presented by actress Kim Medcalf.

=== April ===
Date	Event
3 April	Graham Norton will present How Do You Solve a Problem Like Maria?, a TV talent search for an actress to play Maria in a stage production of The Sound of Music, it is announced.
7 April	12.6 million viewers watch long-running Coronation Street character Mike Baldwin die in the arms of his long-time rival, Ken Barlow. Baldwin, played by Johnny Briggs, had been in the show for 30 years.
13 April	BBC daytime soap opera Doctors air the first same-sex marriage on British television when characters Greg Robinson (Ben Jones) and Rico Da Silva (Felix D'Alviella) get married.
17 April	Peter Bayless wins the 2006 series of MasterChef Goes Large.
19 April	ITV launches ITV Play, a new 24/7 participation TV channel, on Freeview in the United Kingdom. It will launch on other platforms later in the year.
21 April	The Queen celebrates her 80th birthday at Windsor. The Prince of Wales makes a televised address in tribute.
21 April	Denis Norden announces his retirement from his two ongoing ITV shows It'll Be Alright on the Night and spin-off show Denis Norden's Laughter File, after 30 years with ITV.
21 April	ITV secures the terrestrial television screening rights to Casino Royale, the new James Bond film that will be released in November. The film receives its terrestrial television premiere on 19 September 2009.
24 April	Cartoon Network Too and Nick Jr. 2 are launched in the UK.
25 April	The BBC announces that Grandstand, its flagship sports TV programme, will be phased out within the next year after nearly 50 years on air.

=== May ===
Date	Event
5 May	The BBC's local election coverage goes off air shortly before 3:00 am, due to a power failure at their Millbank studios. For the next hour coverage relocates to The Counting House pub, with results being read out using handwritten pieces of paper.
6 May	ITV1 broadcasts the network premiere of Peter Pan.
8 May	Guy Goma, a graduate from the Congo who went to the BBC to attend a job interview, appears on BBC News 24 in place of an IT expert after a mix-up. Guy Kewney had been scheduled to comment on the subject of Apple Computer's court case with The Beatles' record label, Apple Corps, but a producer collected the wrong man from the wrong reception at Television Centre.
8 May	The Price Is Right returns to ITV1 after a five year absence with Joe Pasquale as host.
10 May	Former supermarket cashier Michelle Dewberry wins the second series of The Apprentice and a £100,000 a year job working for Sir Alan Sugar.
14 May	Producers of Coronation Street confirm that Debra Stephenson, who plays Frankie Baldwin, will be leaving the soap at the end of the year.
15 May	BBC High Definition Television Trial commences.
15 May	The University of Manchester wins the 2005–06 series of University Challenge, beating Trinity Hall, Cambridge 160–150.
18 May	Channel 4 airs the first ever Big Brother episode to be shot in 16:9 widescreen.
20 May	Just minutes before the live Eurovision Song Contest final begins, BBC One's live National Lottery draw is invaded by Fathers 4 Justice protestors. The show is temporarily taken off air, leaving just a programme logo and announcer Alan Dedicoat's voice until the problems are resolved.
20 May	Finland's Lordi win the 2006 Eurovision Song Contest (staged in Athens) with "Hard Rock Hallelujah".
20 May	ITV airs The Princes' Trust 30th Birthday Concert Live which is a four-hour fundraiser telethon that includes an outdoor concert, royal interviews and studio-based sketches.
22 May	BSkyB launch High-definition television in the UK under the brand Sky HD.
26 May	UTV changes its registered company name from 'Ulster Television plc' to 'UTV plc', the company's belief being that the existing name no longer reflected the full scope of the company's business.
27 May	The BBC's first scheduled HDTV broadcast on BBC HD.
27 May	The first ever Soccer Aid football match takes place at Old Trafford and is broadcast live on ITV1. England defeat the Rest of the World 2–1 and £2 million is raised for UNICEF, the event's charity partner.
28 May	It is announced that the traditional live Saturday morning kids' programmes are to be axed after 38 years on either channels, ending on 1 July. This is because children have more choice to digital multi channels and ITV will rival Saturday Kitchen with Saturday Cooks!.
30 May	Scottish and Grampian are rebranded as STV Central and STV North respectively.

=== June ===
Date	Event
4 June	Coronation Street confirms that Richard Fleeshman, who plays Craig Harris, will be leaving the soap to follow a singing career.
5 June	Actress Lucy Benjamin wins The X Factor: Battle of the Stars, a celebrity version of the ITV music talent contest.
6 June	ITV announces that Central News South's existence as a news region will end after 17 years when the eastern half of the region (the area served by the Oxford transmitter) merges its operations with Meridian West's output, forming a new news region named ITV Thames Valley.
9 June–9 July	Live coverage of the 2006 FIFA World Cup from Germany is aired by the BBC and ITV.
15 June	The BBC announces that Billie Piper will leave her role as Rose Tyler on Doctor Who at the end of the second series the following month.
19 June	BBC One Controller Peter Fincham announces that They Think It's All Over will not be recommissioned for a new series, ending a run of eleven years on air.
20 June	The BBC announces that Top of the Pops will be axed, the final show airing on 30 July.
20 June	18.46 million watch England vs Sweden in the 2006 FIFA World Cup from Germany, the highest rated programme of the year.
24 June	James Martin presents his first edition of Saturday Kitchen, taking over from Antony Worrall Thompson who has moved to ITV with rival show Saturday Cooks!.
26 June–9 July	Live coverage of the Wimbledon 2006 is aired by the BBC with the first Wimbledon season to be shot in 16:9 widescreen.

=== July ===
Date	Event
1 July	The last live Saturday morning regular-based children's show, Holly and Stephen's Saturday Showdown, is aired after 38 years of broadcasting Saturday morning kids' shows on both channels. They are replaced by cookery programmes permanently.
5 July	Actress Freema Agyeman is announced as the new Doctor Who companion Martha Jones replacing Billie Piper's Rose Tyler.
7 July	Launch of Only Fools on Horses on BBC One, a celebrity show jumping contest airing over nine successive nights in aid of Sport Relief.
10 July	PokerFace debuts on ITV1, stripped across a week with a nightly prize of £50,000 to the winning contestant. The final will then feature the winners of the first six shows gambling their winnings for the chance to walk away with one million pounds.
11 July	It is announced that actress Wendy Richard will leave EastEnders as Pauline Fowler at Christmas. She is one of the only remaining cast members from the show's 1985 launch.
16 July	Sarah Lang wins one million pounds in the final of the ITV1 gameshow PokerFace. As she had also won £32,500 on the BBC One gameshow In It to Win It the previous year, this makes her the biggest known female gameshow winner in UK television history, and second overall behind Ian Woodley.
19 July	CITV transmits its last ever episode of Thomas and Friends. From here, Channel 5 will take over the license to broadcast the series on free-for-air television.
21 July	James Dreyfus replaces Ardal O'Hanlon as George Sunday (Thermoman) in the sixth and final series of My Hero. The series ends in September due to low viewing figures.
23 July	FilmFour is relaunched as a free-to-air channel. It had originally been a subscription service, but this has ended four days previously.
29 July	Debut of How Do You Solve a Problem Like Maria? on BBC One.
30 July	Top of the Pops airs its final regular edition after being axed earlier in the year. However, the show returns for a Christmas special.

=== August ===
Date	Event
14 August	The One Show is first broadcast on BBC One.
18 August	Pete Bennett wins series seven of Big Brother.
22 August	BBC Three debuts Little Miss Jocelyn, written by and starring Jocelyn Jee Esien, marking the first time in the history of television – in either the UK or the US – that a black woman has been given her own solo comedy sketch show.
23 August	ITV secures a deal to sell its 45% stake in Ireland's TV3 for £70m.
23 August	Central Tonight presenter Joanne Malin apologises after swearing during a live broadcast from Trentham Gardens in Stoke-on-Trent. Central subsequently claims to have received no viewer complaints as a result of her description of the inclement weather, but Trentham says several people contacted them offering the presenter their support.
27 August	Playhouse Disney removes most of its in-vision continuity, and its two main presenters Dave Benson Phillips and Alex Lovell (referred to as Big Dave and Little Alex) leave the network.
28 August	Bianca Gascoigne and model Calum Best win the second and final (for the time being) series of Love Island.
29 August	Supernanny airs the controversial Hillhouse-Docharty family episode where Jo Frost fails to curb a 9-year old boy’s violent behaviour in a blended Scottish family, the second ever UK episode where is unsuccessful.

=== September ===
Date	Event
1 September	BBC Entertainment replaces BBC Prime in global markets.
4 September	ITV Lunchtime News moves to 13:30 and returns to run for 30 minutes.
13 September	Ingram Wilcox, a civil servant and quiz show fanatic, has become the fifth person to win the £1 million prize on Who Wants to Be a Millionaire?, it is reported. The episode showing his win, the first in two and a half years, is aired on 16 September.
16 September	Connie Fisher wins BBC One's How Do You Solve a Problems Like Maria?. She will make her debut in the role in a revival of The Sound of Music at London's Palladium Theatre on 14 November.
18 September	Loose Women now broadcasts weekdays at 12.30pm.
20 September	Top Gear presenter Richard Hammond is seriously injured after crashing a jet-powered car at 280 mph.
20 September	BBC One's daytime soap Doctors celebrates its 1000th episode with a one-hour special.
22 September	BBC One airs Episode 5000 of Neighbours.
23 September	BBC One airs the National Lottery one-off show Everyone's A Winner, and is the first BBC show to be presented by Noel Edmonds in over seven years. At the same time, the National Lottery draws are moved to a new separate studio base with its own individual presenter.
25 September	Lianna Fowler wins Cycle 2 of Britain's Next Top Model.
29 September	Matt Dawson wins the 2006 series of Celebrity MasterChef.
30 September	1 vs. 100, the National Lottery game show, debuts on BBC One.

=== October ===
Date	Event
5 October	QI publishes its first book: The Book of General Ignorance. The book becomes a No. 1 best-seller for amazon.co.uk.
6 October	The BBC defends presenter Graham Norton after he admits to having taken recreational drugs, including ecstasy in an interview for Marie Claire magazine. Of Norton's revelation the broadcaster says: "The issues that Graham discusses in this interview are aimed at an adult audience and reflect the frank and open nature of his personality".
7 October	After four and a half years, the BBC 'Rhythm & Movement' idents are shown for the final time on BBC One at 1:10 am, as part of a special montage (2:55 am on BBC One Northern Ireland). Their replacements, the 'Circle' idents, debut at 10 am.
12 October	ITV announces that Where the Heart Is will not be commissioned for a new series.
15 October	Five Life is launched. Among its schedule includes the introduction of a 'first look' showing of Home and Away episodes before they are shown on the main Five channel the next day.
16 October	Five US is launched.
16 October	Numberjacks, the 3D children's educational show, debuts on CBeebies.
20 October	Entertainer Jimmy Tarbuck is forced to withdraw from Strictly Come Dancing because of his health problems.
26 October	ITV confirms the axing of its prison drama, Bad Girls after eight series.
28 October	Family Fortunes returns to ITV1 after a four year absence with new host Vernon Kay and under the title of All Star Family Fortunes, with celebrities playing alongside their real life families to win money for their chosen charity.
29 October	After a six-year absence from television, The Royle Family returns for what is billed as its final episode, an hour-long show titled "The Queen of Sheba".
30 October	In the Grid, a 70 episode primetime game show hosted by Les Dennis, premieres on Five.
30 October	Long running animated series for children Horrid Henry begins on CITV.
31 October	Pop star Madonna appears on Newsnight, where she gives her first British television interview about her controversial adoption of an African baby.

=== November ===
Date	Event
8 November	Virgin Media comes into being when NTL Telewest does a deal to license the Virgin name.
10 November	Lorraine Chase makes her final appearance in Emmerdale as Steph Stokes.
13 November	BBC Parliament broadcasts in full screen format for the first time on the Freeview service, having previously only been available in quarter screen format. The BBC has eventually found the bandwidth to make the channel full-screen after receiving "thousands of angry and perplexed e-mails and letters", not to mention questions asked by MPs in the Houses of Parliament itself.
13 November	ITV launches some new idents themed around "alive with colour", replacing the previous "Emotions" set which have been in use since January.
14 November	Cadbury announces its intention to end its £10m a year sponsorship deal with Coronation Street after a decade. The current sponsorship contract is due to expire at the end of 2007, but Cadbury says it would end the deal earlier if another sponsor is found.
17 November	Episode eight of Series D of QI is a Children in Need special with Alan Davies, Rich Hall, Jonathan Ross and Phill Jupitus, who discuss the topic of Descendants with presenter Stephen Fry.
24 November	ITV Summer tropical reality series Love Island is axed after two series, due to poor ratings. The programme would see a successful return in 2015 on ITV2.
27 November	The BBC confirms that the long-running Holiday Programme is being axed after 37 years on air.
28 November	ITV confirms that BBC chairman Michael Grade is to become its chief executive in early 2007.
28 November	Launch of 4 on demand, a service which allows some internet, Virgin Media Television, Tiscali TV and BT Vision users to view programming recently shown on Channel 4, E4 or More4, or from their archives.
29 November	After seven and a half years on air, Jungle Run airs its last episode.
29 November	Channel 4 axes its music reality series Rock School due to Gene Simmons' other commitments, after two series.

=== December ===
Date	Event
1 December	Matt Willis, a former member of boy band Busted, wins the sixth series of I'm a Celebrity...Get Me Out of Here!.
3 December	The last edition of Central News South is aired. From tomorrow the Central South region will cease to exist. The east of the region including Oxford becomes part of ITV Thames Valley, the west half of the region, covering Cheltenham and Gloucester is absorbed into the ITV West region, while Herefordshire rejoins the Central West region.
4 December	The ITV Thames Valley region, a composite of the old Meridian West and eastern part of the Central South regions, goes on air with a new regional news programme Thames Valley Tonight.
10 December	Equestrian Zara Phillips is named as this year's BBC Sports Personality of the Year, following her mother, Anne, Princess Royal, who won the title in 1971.
10 December	Final episode of Byker Grove aired with the final series having been only shown on the CBBC Channel. The series was axed so that CBBC could shift its focus toward a younger, primary-school-aged audience
13 December	The Berwick-upon-Tweed transmitter transfers from Border to Tyne Tees as part of the preparations for the digital switchover of the Border region in 2008.
16 December	At 5.30am BBC Two airs the final Open University course-related television broadcast. With Open University course content now available through media such as podcasts and DVDs it is no longer necessary for the programmes to be aired on television and radio. However, the Open University continues to make programming for a broader audience, with series including Coast, Child of Our Time and Battle of the Geeks.
16 December	Leona Lewis wins the third civilian series of The X Factor, becoming the ITV show's first female winner. It is also the last edition to be presented by Kate Thornton who is replaced by Dermot O'Leary the following year.
19 December	Following the success of How Do You Solve a Problem Like Maria?, BBC One announces plans for Any Dream Will Do, a follow-up series that will search for someone to play Joseph in the West End musical, Joseph and the Amazing Technicolour Dreamcoat.
22 December	CITV programmes are aired on a weekday afternoon on ITV1 for the final time after 23 years. Starting in January 2007, it will be replaced with repeats of gameshows and dramas. From 2007, CITV programmes are aired exclusively on its own dedicated channel, though ITV1 continues to air some CITV programmes on weekend mornings up until 2023.
22 December	Desmond Lynam presents his last Channel 4's Countdown after over a year of presenting. He will be succeeded in January by Des O'Connor.
23 December	BBC One airs the network premiere of the 2003 DreamWorks animated film Sinbad: Legend of the Seven Seas.
23 December	Cricketer Mark Ramprakash and his dancing partner Karen Hardy win the fourth series of Strictly Come Dancing.
23 December	Stars in Their Eyes ends, with the last special celebrity episode presented by Cat Deeley, due to the fact that she has moved to the US by this point. The show is revived in 2015, fronted by Harry Hill.
24 December	Christmas Eve highlights on BBC One include Calendar Girls, a film starring Helen Mirren and Julie Walters along with an ensemble cast.
25 December	Actress Wendy Richard makes her final appearance in EastEnders after her character, Pauline Fowler, is killed off in a dramatic storyline. She has been in the show since its inception in 1985. Richard dies in February 2009 at the age of 65.
25 December	Launch of Emmerdale's whodunit storyline involving the murder of Tom King (played by Ken Farrington). Tom is hit over the head and falls through a window to his death on his wedding day.
26 December	Casper is aired on BBC One for the last time. Boxing Day highlights on BBC One include the films Freaky Friday and Pirates of the Caribbean: The Curse of the Black Pearl. ITV airs a one-off dramatisation of After Thomas, with Keeley Hawes, Ben Miles, Sheila Hancock, Asa Butterfield and Andrew Byrne. It is produced by Beryl Vertue and Elaine Cameron, directed by Simon Shore, and written by Lindsey Hill. The film centres on the severely autistic child Kyle Graham and the progress he makes when his parents adopt a Golden Retriever named Thomas. It is based on the true story of Scottish child Dale Gardner and his dog Henry.

== Debuts ==
=== BBC One ===
Date	Debut
9 January	Life on Mars
15 January	Johnny and the Bomb
15 January	Friends and Crocodiles
19 January	Hotel Babylon
22 January	The Virgin Queen
26 February	Gideon's Daughter
9 March	Waterloo Road
23 March	The Family Man
30 March	Casualty 1900s
13 April	The Street
13 April	Totally Doctor Who
4 May	New Street Law
5 May	Home Again
5 June	Maya & Miguel
12 June	Don't Get Done, Get Dom
16 July	The Chase
26 July	Shiny Shiny Bright New Hole in My Heart
8 September	Aftersun
21 September	Young Dracula
22 September	The Slammer
24 September	Jane Eyre
3 October	The Amazing Mrs Pritchard
6 October	Not Going Out
7 October	Robin Hood
9 October	Wide Sargasso Sea
2 November	The State Within
27 December	The Ruby in the Smoke
28 December	Dracula

=== BBC Two ===
Date	Debut
11 January	Hyperdrive
12 February	Petrolheads
17 May	The Line of Beauty
6 June	The Thieving Headmistress
19 June	Saxondale
12 July	Soundproof
3 August	Time Trumpet
4 September	Me Too!
16 September	The Secret Show
16 September	TMi
8 October	Something for the Weekend
16 October	Numberjacks

=== BBC Three ===
Date	Debut
16 July	Sinchronicity
22 August	Little Miss Jocelyn
22 October	Torchwood

=== BBC Four ===
Date	Debut
2 March	Charlie Brooker's ...wipe
20 March	The Chatterley Affair
4 October	Lead Balloon

=== ITV (1/2/3/4/CITV) ===
Date	Debut
14 January	Dancing on Ice
16 January	Northern Lights
29 January	Lewis, a spin-off from Inspector Morse.
29 January	Wild at Heart
27 February	Love Lies Bleeding
13 March	A Good Murder
9 April	Ghostboat
21 April	The Incredible Journey of Mary Bryant
7 May	If I Had You
14 May	See No Evil: The Moors Murders
10 July	PokerFace
12 July	Jane Hall
13 September	Losing It
16 October	Bel's Boys
30 October	Horrid Henry
6 November	Dickinson's Real Deal
16 November	Strictly Confidential
9 December	Extinct
10 December	Housewife, 49
18 December	Losing Gemma
26 December	After Thomas

=== Channel 4 ===
Date	Debut
6 January	My Name Is Earl
3 February	The IT Crowd
7 May	How I Met Your Mother
11 May	All in the Game
27 June	How to Look Good Naked
1 August	Blunder
14 September	Low Winter Sun
18 October	Goldplated
26 October	Longford
2 November	A Harlot's Progress

=== Five ===
Date	Debut
19 March	Everybody Hates Chris
27 April	Suburban Shootout
30 August	Respectable
30 October	Tripping Over

=== Nicktoons UK ===
Date	Debut
May	Kappa Mikey

=== Disney Channel UK ===
Date	Debut
6 May	Hannah Montana

=== Cartoon Network UK ===
Date	Debut
2 January	The Batman Pokémon: Advanced Battle
14 January	Johnny Test Coconut Fred's Fruit Salad Island!
4 March	Ben 10
4 September	My Gym Partner's a Monkey
6 October	Skatoony

=== Cartoon Network Too ===
Date	Debut
4 September	Blanche
4 September	Ellen's Acres
4 September	Pororo the Little Penguin

=== Playhouse Disney UK ===
Date	Debut
24 April	Doodlebops
Mid-July	Mickey Mouse Clubhouse

== Channels ==
=== New channels ===
Date	Channel
1 March	Bliss
2 March	Player
6 March	Boomerang +1
11 March	CITV
16 March	Disney Cinemagic
16 March	Disney Cinemagic +1
19 April	ITV Play
24 April	Cartoon Network Too
24 April	Nick Jr. 2
24 April	TCM 2
2 May	UKTV Drama +1
15 May	BBC HD
22 May	Artsworld HD
22 May	Discovery HD
22 May	National Geographic Channel HD
22 May	Sky Box Office HD 1
22 May	Sky Box Office HD 2
22 May	Sky Movies 9 HD
22 May	Sky Movies 10 HD
22 May	Sky Sports HD
22 May	Sky One HD
31 July	Sky Sports HD 2
7 August	AAG TV UK
15 October	Five Life
16 October	Five US

=== Defunct channels ===
Date	Channel
6 March	Cartoon Network +
16 March	Toon Disney
18 April	UKTV People +1
19 July	FilmFour Weekly
1 August	VH2

=== Rebranded channels ===
Date	Old Name	New Name
23 July	FilmFour	Film4
23 July	FilmFour +1	Film4 +1
31 July	Sky Sports HD	Sky Sports HD 1
28 September	Player	Bravo 2

== Television shows ==
=== Changes of network affiliation ===
Show	Moved from	Moved to
Lost	Channel 4	Sky One
Bagpuss	Channel 4	Five
The Clangers	Channel 4	Five
Ivor the Engine	Channel 4	Five
Noggin the Nog	Channel 4	Five
World's Strongest Man	BBC One	Five
Thomas & Friends	ITV	Five
The Paul O'Grady Show	ITV	Channel 4
Sonic Underground	GMTV	GMTV2 / CITV
Family Guy (first run rights)	BBC Two	BBC Three
Little Einsteins	Playhouse Disney	CITV

=== Returning this year after a break of one year or longer ===
Programme	Date(s) of original removal	Original channel(s)	Date(s) of return	New channel(s)
Finders Keepers	1 March 1985; 6 August 1996	CITV	6 January 2006	N/A (Same channel as original)
Jackanory	24 March 1996	BBC One; CBBC	27 November 2006	N/A (Same channel as original)
Family Fortunes as All Star Family Fortunes	31 May 1985; 30 December 2002	ITV	28 October 2006	N/A (Same channel as original)
Words and Pictures	2001	BBC One & BBC Two	2006	CBeebies

== Continuing television shows ==
=== 1920s ===
- BBC Wimbledon (1927–1939, 1946–2019, 2021–present)

=== 1930s ===
- Trooping the Colour (1937–1939, 1946–2019, 2023–present)
- The Boat Race (1938–1939, 1946–2019, 2021–present)

=== 1950s ===
- Panorama (1953–present)
- What the Papers Say (1956–2008)
- The Sky at Night (1957–present)
- Blue Peter (1958–present)
- Grandstand (1958–2007)

=== 1960s ===
- Coronation Street (1960–present)
- Songs of Praise (1961–present)
- Doctor Who (1963–1989, 1996, 2005–present)
- Top of the Pops (1964–2006)
- Match of the Day (1964–present)
- The Money Programme (1966–2010)

=== 1970s ===
- Emmerdale (1972–present)
- Newsround (1972–present)
- Last of the Summer Wine (1973–2010)
- Arena (1975–present)
- One Man and His Dog (1976–present)
- Grange Hill (1978–2008)
- Ski Sunday (1978–present)
- Antiques Roadshow (1979–present)
- Question Time (1979–present)

=== 1980s ===
- Children in Need (1980–present)
- Postman Pat (1981, 1991, 1994, 1996, 2004–2008)
- Timewatch (1982–present)
- Countdown (1982–present)
- The Bill (1984–2010)
- Channel 4 Racing (1984–2016)
- Thomas & Friends (1984–present)
- EastEnders (1985–present)
- Comic Relief (1985–present)
- Casualty (1986–present)
- ChuckleVision (1987–2009)
- Fireman Sam (1987–1994, 2005–2013)
- This Morning (1988–present)
- The Simpsons (1989–present)

=== 1990s ===
- Have I Got News for You (1990–present)
- Room 101 (1994–2007, 2012–2018)
- A Touch of Frost (1992–2010)
- Heartbeat (1992–2010)
- Time Team (1994–2013)
- The National Lottery Draws (1994–2017)
- Top of the Pops 2 (1994–2017)
- Hollyoaks (1995–present)
- Arthur (1996–present)
- Never Mind the Buzzcocks (1996–2015)
- Silent Witness (1996–present)
- King of the Hill (1997–2010)
- Midsomer Murders (1997–present)
- South Park (1997–present)
- Who Wants to Be a Millionaire? (1998–2014)
- Bob the Builder (1998–present).
- Bremner, Bird and Fortune (1999–2010)
- British Soap Awards (1999–2019, 2022–present)
- Family Guy (1999–2002, 2005–present)
- SpongeBob SquarePants (1999–present)
- Holby City (1999–2022)

=== 2000s ===
- The Weakest Link (2000–2012, 2017–present)
- Popworld (2001–2007)
- Real Crime (2001–2011)
- Flog It! (2002–2020)
- Foyle's War (2002–2015)
- I'm a Celebrity...Get Me Out of Here! (2002–present)
- Harry Hill's TV Burp (2002–2012)
- Spooks (2002–2011)
- River City (2002–2026)
- Top Gear (2002–present)
- Daily Politics (2003–2018)
- New Tricks (2003–2015)
- Peep Show (2003–2015)
- All Grown Up! (2003–2008)
- Tiny Pop (2003–2008)
- Politics Show (2003–2011)
- QI (2003–present)
- The Royal (2003–2011)
- PointlessBlog (2003–2007)
- This Week (2003–2019)
- Strictly Come Dancing (2004–present)
- Sea of Souls (2004–2007)
- Supernanny (2004–2008, 2010–2012)
- Shameless (2004–2013)
- Doc Martin (2004–2019)
- The X Factor (2004–2018)
- More4 News (2005—2009)
- Love Soup (2005–2008)
- Come Dine with Me (2005–present)
- Pocoyo (2005–2012, 2017–present)
- The Jeremy Kyle Show (2005–2019)
- It's Me or the Dog (2005–2012)
- Deal or No Deal (2005–2016)
- Sunday AM (2005–2021)

== Ending this year ==
Date(s)	Show	Channel(s)	Debut(s)
13 January	Muffin the Mule	CBeebies	1946 & 2005
13 January	ITV Day	ITV	2005
19 February	Rock School	Channel 4	2005
28 February	Love Lies Bleeding	ITV	2006
3 March	Pingu	CBeebies/BBC One	1986 & 2004
1 April	CD:UK	ITV	1998
6 April	The Family Man	BBC One	2006
14 April	Footballers' Wives	ITV	2002
14 April	Finders Keepers	CITV	1991 & 2006
2 May	That'll Teach 'Em	Channel 4	2003
9 June	They Think It's All Over	BBC One	1995
29 June	Cash Cab	ITV	2005
30 June	Coach Trip	Channel 4	2005
1 July	Saturday morning kids' programmes	CBBC & CITV	1968
30 July	Top of the Pops (weekly episodes)	BBC One & BBC Two	1964
17 August	Sugar Rush	Channel 4	2005
18 August	The Kumars	BBC One	2001
28 August	(Celebrity) Love Island	ITV	2005
29 August	Bad Lads' Army: Extreme	ITV	2002
10 September	Where the Heart Is	ITV	1997
10 September	My Hero	BBC One	2000
22 September	Bullseye	Challenge	1981 & 2006
15 October	Jane Eyre	BBC One	2006
22 October	Prime Suspect	ITV	1991
6 November	Vincent	ITV	2005
22 November	Afterlife	ITV	2005
7 December	The State Within	BBC One	2006
10 December	Byker Grove	BBC One	1989
16 December	Extinct	ITV	2006
18 December	My Parents Are Aliens	ITV	1999
19 December	Losing Gemma	ITV	2006
23 December	Stars in Their Eyes	ITV	1990
27 December	The Biggest Loser	Sky	2005

== Deaths ==
Date	Name	Age	Broadcast credibility
2 January	John Woodnutt	81	actor (Jeeves and Wooster, Doctor Who)
28 January	Henry McGee	76	actor (The Benny Hill Show)
5 February	Peter Philp	85	television presenter (Collectors' Club)
16 February	Dennis Kirkland	63	television director and producer (The Benny Hill Show)
20 February	Lou Gish	38	actress (Casualty, EastEnders, New Tricks)
27 February	Linda Smith	48	comedian
1 March	Jack Wild	53	actor (H. R. Pufnstuf, The Newcomers, George and the Dragon)
7 March	John Junkin	76	comic actor and screenwriter (The Sweeney, Only When I Laugh, Inspector Morse)
16 March	Moira Redmond	77	actress (Domitia in I, Claudius)
18 March	Michael Attwell	63	actor (Kenny Beale in EastEnders)
24 March	Lynne Perrie	74	actress (Ivy Tilsley in Coronation Street)
12 April	Richard Bebb	79	actor (Compact, Poirot)
13 April	John Read	85	television producer
17 April	Peter Cadbury	88	television executive
23 April	Jennifer Jayne	74	actress (The Adventures of William Tell)
19 May	Peter Bryant	82	actor (The Grove Family) and television producer
2 June	Ronald Cass	83	television scriptwriter
4 June	Alec Bregonzi	76	actor (Hancock's Half Hour, The Two Ronnies, Filthy Rich and Catflap)
25 June	Elkan Allan	83	television producer
25 June	Kenneth Griffith	84	actor and documentary film-maker (Minder, Lovejoy)
6 July	Tom Weir	91	mountaineer and television presenter (Weir's Way)
8 July	Peter Hawkins	82	actor and voice artist (Doctor Who, Rainbow, Captain Pugwash)
18 July	David Maloney	72	television director and producer (Doctor Who, Blake's 7)
25 July	Bob Simpson	61	BBC news correspondent
28 July	Patrick Allen	79	actor (The Saint, UFO, The Adventures of Sherlock Holmes)
6 August	Stella Moray	83	actress (Coronation Street, Crossroads, The Bill, Midsomer Murders, George and Mildred)
13 August	Tony Jay	73	actor, voice actor and singer (Mighty Ducks, ReBoot, The Hunchback of Notre Dame, The Jungle Book 2, Blood Omen: Legacy of Kain, Legacy of Kain: Soul Reaver, Beauty and the Beast)
19 August	Joyce Blair	73	actress (The Morecambe and Wise Show, The Benny Hill Show, The Adventures of Robin Hood)
24 August	David Plowright	75	television producer and executive
2 September	Charlie Williams	78	footballer, actor and comedian (The Comedians, Love Thy Neighbour)
5 September	Anne Gregg	66	travel writer and television presenter (Holiday)
5 September	Hilary Mason	89	actress (Maid Marian and her Merry Men)
8 September	Frank Middlemass	87	actor (As Time Goes By, To Serve Them All My Days, Heartbeat)
14 September	Peter Ling	80	television scriptwriter (Crossroads)
15 September	Raymond Baxter	84	television presenter (Tomorrow's World)
4 October	Tom Bell	73	actor (Prime Suspect)
5 October	Jennifer Moss	61	actress (Lucille Hewitt in Coronation Street)
15 October	Derek Bond	86	actor (Callan, Thriller)
16 October	Ross Davidson	57	actor (Andy O'Brien in EastEnders)
21 October	Peter Barkworth	77	actor (The Avengers, Manhunt, Winston Churchill: The Wilderness Years)
21 October	Paul Walters	59	television producer
22 October	Richard Mayes	83	actor
29 October	Nigel Kneale	84	television scriptwriter (The Quatermass Experiment)
10 November	Diana Coupland	78	actress (Bless This House)
10 November	Chubby Oates	63	comedian
11 November	Ronnie Stevens	81	actor (Goodnight Sweetheart, Only When I Laugh, Ever Decreasing Circles, Hi-de-Hi!, Yes, Prime Minister, As Time Goes By)
14 November	John Hallam	65	actor (EastEnders)
23 November	Nick Clarke	58	television presenter
26 November	Anthony Jackson	62	actor (Rentaghost, Bless This House)
27 November	Alan Freeman	79	radio DJ and presenter (Top of the Pops)
6 December	Mavis Pugh	92	actress (Are You Being Served?, Fawlty Towers, You Rang, M'Lord?)
7 December	Desmond Briscoe	81	television sound engineer
23 December	Charlie Drake	81	comic performer (The Worker)

== See also ==
- 2006 in British music
- 2006 in British radio
- 2006 in the United Kingdom
- List of British films of 2006
