= 2006 in British music =

This is a summary of 2006 in music in the United Kingdom.

== Events ==
- 18 February – The Rolling Stones give a free concert to two million people in Rio de Janeiro, Brazil.
- 22 February – The one billionth song is downloaded on iTunes; the song is "Speed of Sound" by Coldplay.
- 3 March – Disgraced glam rock singer Gary Glitter is convicted of sexually abusing two young girls at his villa in Vietnam and is sentenced to three years in jail.
- 10 March – David Gilmour begins his first world tour since Pink Floyd's 1994 world tour, in support of his On an Island album.
- 11 March – James Blunt, with his single "You're Beautiful", becomes the first British artist to top the US Billboard Hot 100 chart since Elton John with "Candle in the Wind 1997"
- 20 May – Finnish monster rock band Lordi win the Eurovision Song Contest 2006. The UK entry, "Teenage Life" by Daz Sampson, finishes in 19th place with 25 points.
- 30 July – The last weekly edition of the British television chart show, Top of the Pops, is broadcast.
- 2 August – Anthony Payne's reconstruction of Pomp and Circumstance March No. 6 by Edward Elgar from the composer's sketches, gets its world premiere at the Proms.
- 10 October – Justin Hawkins, lead singer of The Darkness announces he is leaving the band.
- 25 October – Guitarist Brian May announces on his website that Queen is returning to the studio for recording sessions. The new lineup, Queen + Paul Rodgers, features May, Paul Rodgers (the former lead vocalist of Free) and former Queen drummer Roger Taylor.
- 26 October – Duran Duran lead guitarist Andy Taylor once again leaves the band after a series of disagreements surrounding their latest album, which was still incomplete by the year's end. Reasons given are his disapproval of the usage of both Timbaland and Justin Timberlake in the creation of the band's album. The band hires an interim guitarist to supplant Taylor, with no real replacement being announced.
- 31 October – The Who release Endless Wire, their first studio album for 24 years.
- 16 November – Snow Patrol become the first British rock band in 13 years to reach the top five of the US Billboard Hot 100.
- 16 December – Leona Lewis is named winner of the third series of The X Factor UK. Ray Quinn is named runner-up, while Ben Mills and The MacDonald Brothers finish in third and fourth place respectively.

== Classical music ==
- Richard Rodney Bennett – The Garden – A Serenade to Glimmerglass
- Patrick Hawes – Towards the Light
- Alun Hoddinott – Towy Landscape for soprano, baritone and piano (4 hands)
- Martin Kennedy – Suite for string quartet
- Paul Mealor – Liturgy of Fire
- John Tavener – Lament for Jerusalem

== Opera ==
- Stephen Barlow – King
- Jonathan Dove – Man on the Moon (television opera)
- Stuart MacRae – The Assassin Tree (with libretto by Simon Armitage)

== Film and incidental music ==
- David Arnold
  - Amazing Grace
  - Casino Royale
- Patrick Doyle – As You Like It
- Laura Rossi – London to Brighton
- John Tavener – Children of Men

== Music awards ==
=== Brit Awards ===
- Best British Male Solo Artist: James Blunt
- Best British Female Solo Artist: KT Tunstall
- Best British Group: Kaiser Chiefs
- Best British Album: Coldplay – X&Y
- Best British Single: Coldplay – "Speed of Sound"
- Best British Rock Act: Kaiser Chiefs
- Best British Urban Act: Lemar
- Best British Live Act: Kaiser Chiefs
- British Breakthrough Artist: Arctic Monkeys
- Best Pop Act: James Blunt
- Best International Male Solo Artist: Kanye West
- Best International Female Solo Artist: Madonna
- Best International Group: Green Day
- Best International Album: Green Day – American Idiot
- International Breakthrough Artist: Jack Johnson
- Outstanding Contribution to Music: Paul Weller

=== British Composer Awards ===
- Orchestral: Simon Holt
- Stage Works: Brian Irvine
- BBC Radio 3 Listeners Award: Jonny Greenwood

=== Ivor Novello Awards ===
- Best Song Musically & Lyrically: KT Tunstall – 'Suddenly I See'
- Most Performed Work: James Blunt – 'You're Beautiful'
- Best Television Soundtrack: Rob Lane – Elizabeth I
- Outstanding Song Collection: New Order
- Best Selling UK Single: Shayne Ward – 'That's My Goal'
- Best Album: Kaiser Chiefs: 'Employment'
- Classical Music Award: Sir Harrison Birtwistle
- International Hit of the Year: James Blunt – 'You're Beautiful'
- Best Original Film Score: 'Evil'
- Best Contemporary Song: Athlete – 'Wires'
- International Achievement: Ian Anderson (Jethro Tull)
- Songwriters of the Year: Damon Albarn/Jamie Hewlett (Gorillaz)
- PRS Outstanding Contribution to British Music: Ray Davies
- The Special International Award: Kenny Gamble/Leon Huff
- The Academy Fellowship: Barry Gibb/Maurice Gibb (Posthumous)/Robin Gibb

=== Mercury Music Prize ===
- Arctic Monkeys – Whatever People Say I Am, That's What I'm Not

== Deaths ==
- 12 January – Jack Wilson, jazz pianist, 98
- 8 February – Elton Dean, saxophonist (Soft Machine), 60 (liver disease)
- 14 February – Lynden David Hall, English singer-songwriter and producer, 31 (Hodgkin's lymphoma)
- 15 February – Eric Shilling, opera singer and producer, 85
- 3 March – Ivor Cutler, poet, songwriter and humorist, 83
- 26 March – Nikki Sudden, singer-songwriter, 49 (heart attack).
- 3 April – Martin Gilks, drummer, (The Wonder Stuff), 41 (motorcycle accident)
- 9 April – Robin Orr, composer, 96
- 17 April – Calum Kennedy, singer, 77
- 18 April – John Burch, pianist, composer and bandleader, 74
- 19 May – Freddie Garrity, singer (Freddie and the Dreamers), 69
- 20 June – Maurice Bevan, operatic bass-baritone and composer, 85
- 29 June – Joyce Hatto, pianist and teacher, 77
- 5 July – Don Lusher, trombonist, 82
- 7 July – Syd Barrett, singer, songwriter, guitarist and founding-member of Pink Floyd, 60 (pancreatic cancer)
- 1 August – John Mole, bass guitarist, 57
- 8 August – Michael Hurd, composer and musicologist, 77
- 28 August – Pip Pyle, drummer (Hatfield and the North and Gong), 56
- 4 September – Clive Lythgoe, pianist, 79
- 21 September – Boz Burrell, bass guitarist of Bad Company and King Crimson, 60
- 23 September – Malcolm Arnold, composer, 84
- 18 October – Anna Russell, singer and comedian, 94
- 26 October – John Kentish, operatic tenor, 96
- 19 November – Emanuel Hurwitz, violinist, 87
- 6 December – Wiz, singer, guitarist, (Mega City Four), 44
- 7 December – Desmond Briscoe, composer, sound engineer and studio manager, 81
- 9 December – Freddie Marsden, drummer of Gerry & The Pacemakers
- 17 December – Denis Payton (The Dave Clark Five), 63
- 30 December – Robert Ashfield, organist, choirmaster and composer, 95

== See also ==
- 2006 in British radio
- 2006 in British television
- 2006 in the United Kingdom
- List of British films of 2006
- 2006 in Swiss music
