= A Good Year (novel) =

2004 novel by Peter Mayle

- First edition (UK)
- Author: Peter Mayle
- Language: English
- Published: 2004
- Publisher: Sphere Books
- Publication place: United Kingdom

A Good Year is a 2004 novel by English writer Peter Mayle, author of A Year in Provence and Chasing Cézanne. The story follows Max Skinner, a London stockbroker who loses his job before finding out that he inherited a vineyard in France from his late uncle Henry.

== Plot summary ==
Max Skinner is a moderately successful trader in a City finance company. After spending several months compiling a lucrative trade contract, only to have it taken over by his immediate superior, he resigns, losing his car, income, and expected bonus, leaving him in debt. The same day he receives a letter from a notary in France, telling him his uncle Henry has just died, bequeathing him his estate in Provence. This is Le Griffon, a house and vineyard where Max had spent much of his childhood. After discussing the matter with his friend Charlie Willis, an estate agent and wine enthusiast, and with a substantial loan from him, Max travels to France to investigate the inheritance with a view to becoming a wine producer.

After meeting the notary, the attractive Nathalie Auzet, Max discovers a large but derelict house, with 20 acres of vineyard. The house needs repair, the soil is thin and dry, especially a stony patch on the edge of the estate, and the wine a poor quality; "like gendarmes socks", as he tells Charlie later. He makes several excuses to spend time with Nathalie, taking her to lunch to discuss improving the wine, and later to an antique fair to check the possibilities of selling off some of the furniture. He meets Roussel, the vigneron, who laments the state of the wine, blaming lack of investment. Max proposes to call in an oenologue to advise on improving the wine, which disturbs Roussel. Max also finds a picture of Henry with an American woman who he doesn't recognise.

The story cuts to Bordeaux, where a wine merchant, Fitzgerald, is hosting an exclusive wine tasting for a specialist wine, Le Coin Perdu, a fine quality, but a small production (600 cases) to be sold at prices of 40,000 per case.

Back at Le Griffon, Max is visited by a young American woman, Christie Roberts, who tells him Henry was her father. Max confirms this by showing her a picture in which she identifies her mother. Max suggests the inheritance may be hers, not his, and they consult a lawyer, Maitre Bosc. He tells them it is a grey area, and could take months to resolve; in the meantime they should both stay at Le Griffon, to avoid abandoning their claim. Under the same roof Max and Christie are soon at loggerheads, ending when she hits him with a skillet during an argument, knocking him unconscious.

Walking round the estate Christie, who has some knowledge of viticulture, finds the stony patch and recognises its potential and the care lavished on the vines there. In the village Max meets Fanny Chenal, a restaurant owner who is attracted to him. Max and Christie are invited to dinner with Roussel, and Max is surprised at the opulence of Roussel's home, in contrast to his usual rough appearance.

The oenologue arrives, none other than Fitzgerald, who gives a damning assessment of the vines, even those on the stony patch. Christie is unconvinced, and suspicious of him, and later suggests a second opinion.

At this Roussel becomes worried and takes Max to the wine cave, where he confesses; the vines on the stony patch are an unofficial cross-bred planting of his own, yielding an excellent but illegal wine. Unsure of what to do with it, and fearing official sanction, Roussel had consulted the notary, who had arranged a buyer. For the last eight years Roussel had been selling the entire vintage, which was collected in secret at dead of night by unmarked truck, in exchange for E 100,000 per consignment.

Max remembers a wine label he had seen at Nathalie's house, and Charlie is able to identify it as Le Coin Perdu, sold by one JM Fitzgerald. Max realises the oenologue inspection had been a ruse, arranged by Nathalie to allay his suspicions, and they travel to Bordeaux to investigate. Charlie, masquerading as a client, is able to get a sample bottle of Le Coin Perdu and Roussel confirms it is his wine. However, when they return to confront Fitzgerald, they are met by the police.

On their return they find Nathalie has disappeared; seeking Roussel and Max on a matter she had become suspicious and warned Fitzgerald, and they had fled with their winnings.

At the village fete, Max and Fanny become enamoured with each other, while Charlie and Christie are already in love. Christie tells Max she has no interest in pursuing a claim to Le Griffon and resumes her travels, ending up in London with Charlie. Max settles into the role of a wine producer, planning improvements with Roussel. They realise the police at Fitzgerald's place were part of the scam, and no one knows of their connection with Le Coin Perdu.

The story ends with a party thrown by Max and Fanny, to celebrate the completion of a good year.

== Production ==
The idea for the book emerged from discussions Mayle had with his Provence neighbour, director Ridley Scott, who had interest in a cross-cultural fish-out-of-water comedy about an Englishman transplanted to Provence. In 2006 Scott adapted the book into a film starring Russell Crowe.
