= The Marseille Caper =

Peter Mayle novel (2012)

- Author: Peter Mayle
- Language: English
- Set in: Marseille
- Publisher: Knopf (US); Quercus Books (UK)
- Publication date: 2012
- Media type: Print
- Pages: 272
- ISBN: 9780307740953
- Dewey Decimal: 823.914

The Marseille Caper is a 2012 novel by Peter Mayle.

== Synopsis ==
Set in Marseille, and part of the Sam Levitt Capers series, The Marseille Caper follows Sam Lewitt a corporate lawyer turned "fixer" and his interactions with locals amidst a mysterious property deal.

== Reception ==
Writing in The Washington Post, John Wilwol praised the novel as "delightful" while in the Denver Post Tucker Shaw described the book as "like an excellent meal at a beloved restaurant, you’ll savor every morsel, and you’ll be sorry to see it end."
