= A Year in the Province =

2008 novel by Christopher Marsh

- Cover
- Author: Christopher Marsh
- Language: English
- Publisher: Beautiful Books
- Publication date: 2008
- Publication place: United Kingdom
- Media type: Print
- Pages: 352
- ISBN: 978-1-905636-67-9
- OCLC: 187294636

A Year in the Province is a comic novel by Christopher Marsh. The book tells the story of Jesus Sanchez Ventura, who persuades his wife Begona and his three daughters to leave Andalusia for Belfast. The book was well received by critics, with the BBC's Ian Sansom comparing Marsh to Flann O'Brien. The book's title references the bestselling memoir by Peter Mayle, A Year in Provence.

== The author ==
Christopher Marsh read history at Cambridge. He has since worked as an academic, publishing numerous historical titles, and is a Professor of History at Queen's University, Belfast.
