= A Good Year =

2006 film by Ridley Scott

- Theatrical release poster
- Directed by: Ridley Scott
- Screenplay by: Marc Klein
- Based on: A Good Year by Peter Mayle
- Produced by: Ridley Scott
- Starring: Russell Crowe; Albert Finney; Marion Cotillard; Tom Hollander; Freddie Highmore
- Cinematography: Philippe Le Sourd
- Edited by: Dody Dorn
- Music by: Marc Streitenfeld
- Production companies: Fox 2000 Pictures; Scott Free Productions; Dune Entertainment; Ingenious Film Partners; Major Studio Partners
- Distributed by: 20th Century Fox
- Release dates: 27 October 2006 (United Kingdom); 10 November 2006 (United States)
- Running time: 118 minutes
- Countries: United Kingdom; United States
- Language: English
- Budget: $35 million
- Box office: $42.3 million

A Good Year is a 2006 romantic comedy-drama film directed and produced by Ridley Scott, based on the 2004 novel by Peter Mayle. The film stars Russell Crowe, Marion Cotillard, Didier Bourdon, Abbie Cornish, Tom Hollander, Freddie Highmore and Albert Finney.

British investment broker Max Skinner discovers he is the only known relative of his uncle Henry, so inherits his Provence chateau and vineyard, where he spent many of his summers. As he spruces up the estate to be sold, he rediscovers what he had loved about the place.

The film was released theatrically in the United Kingdom on 27 October 2006 and in the United States on 10 November 2006 by 20th Century Fox. It received mixed reviews from critics and was a box office bomb, grossing $42.3 million against its $35 million budget and resulting in a $20 million loss for Fox, but it received nominations for the Critics Choice Award for Best Young Actor and the Satellite Award for Best Cinematography.

== Plot ==
Young Max Skinner, whose parents died in an accident, spends his childhood summer holidays learning to appreciate the finer things at his Uncle Henry's vineyard estate in Provence in southeastern France. Twenty-five years later, Max is a successful but arrogant workaholic trader in London with a cheeky persona.

Following his uncle's death, Max is the sole beneficiary of the French property. He travels to Provence to prepare a quick sale. Shortly after arriving, by driving while fumbling with a cell phone, he unknowingly causes a local café owner, Fanny Chenal, to crash her bicycle. Subsequently, he discovers that his latest City financial stunt has caused real trouble for the owners of the trading company he works for, and he is ordered to return to London as soon as possible.

To assist in his planned sale of the property, Max hurriedly snaps some photos and, in the process, falls into an empty and very dirty swimming pool. He is unable to escape until Fanny finds him and, in retaliation for his running her over, simply turns on the water so that the pool eventually fills and he is able to get himself out. This delay causes Max to miss his flight and, having failed to report to the directors in person, he is suspended from work and trading activities for one week.

On Henry's estate, Max must deal with the gruff, dedicated winemaker Francis Duflot, who fears being separated from his precious vines. Duflot pays a vineyard inspector to tell Max that the soil is bad and the vines worthless.

They are surprised by the arrival of young Napa Valley oenophile Christie Roberts, who is backpacking through Europe and claims to be Henry's previously unknown illegitimate daughter. Max learns, but does not tell her, that French law decrees that even though she is not his uncle's legitimate daughter, she still becomes the rightful heir to the estate and vineyards.

As Max did earlier, Christie finds the house wine unpalatable but is impressed by Max's casual offering of the boutique Le Coin Perdu ("The Lost Corner") vintage, noting some intriguing characteristics. During dinner at the Duflot house, while slightly inebriated, Max exposes his concern that she might lay claim to the estate and brusquely interrogates her.

Max's assistant Gemma warns him of the ambitious antics of other employees. To ensure he is not usurped by Kenny, his second-in-command in London, through whom Max continues to direct trades, he intentionally gives the ambitious young trader bad advice, getting him fired.

Max becomes enamoured with Fanny, who is rumoured to have sworn off men. He successfully woos her into his bed. She leaves him the next morning, expecting him to return to his life in London. A disillusioned Christie also decides to move on.

Max finds his uncle's memoirs, which contain proof of Christie's heritage. He bids her farewell while handing her an unexplained note inside a book she was reading. While informing Duflot of the pending estate sale, Max learns that the mysterious expensive Le Coin Perdu was made by Henry and Duflot with "illegal vines" from the estate, bypassing wine classification and appellation laws.

The estate is sold and Max returns to London where the company chairman Sir Nigel offers him a choice: either a large discharge settlement, or the partnership in the trading firm. Max asks about Nigel's art in the conference room, van Gogh's Road with Cypress and Star, which Fanny has a copy of in her restaurant. Upon hearing the dismissive comment that the real one is kept in a vault and the $200,000 copy in the office is for show, Max reconsiders whether he wants to still be like Nigel.

Max invalidates the estate's sale with the farewell letter he gave to Christie, which he forged, along with real photos confirming Christie as Henry's daughter with a valid claim to the entire estate. (As a child, Max signed cheques for his uncle and is able to replicate his handwriting.)

Putting his London residence up for sale, Max returns to Provence, entering into a relationship with Fanny, both of them remembering their connection as children. Christie also returns and she and Francis jointly run the vineyard while trying to reconcile their vastly different philosophies of wine production. This enables Max to focus his entire attention on Fanny.

== Cast ==
- Russell Crowe as Max Skinner
  - Freddie Highmore as young Max Skinner
- Albert Finney as Uncle Henry
- Marion Cotillard as Fanny Chenal
- Abbie Cornish as Christie Roberts
- Didier Bourdon as Francis Duflot
- Tom Hollander as Charlie Willis
- Isabelle Candelier as Ludivine Duflot
- Kenneth Cranham as Sir Nigel
- Archie Panjabi as Gemma
- Rafe Spall as Kenny
- Richard Coyle as Amis
- Daniel Mays as Bert, the doorman
- Valeria Bruni Tedeschi as notaire Nathalie Auzet
- Giannina Facio as maître d'

== Production ==
=== Development and writing ===
"As I go on, I'm very attracted to comedy. At the end of the day, because you've been having a good old laugh, you go home laughing—as opposed to dealing with blood all day and you go home and want to cut your wrists."

— Ridley Scott on breaking away from action movies

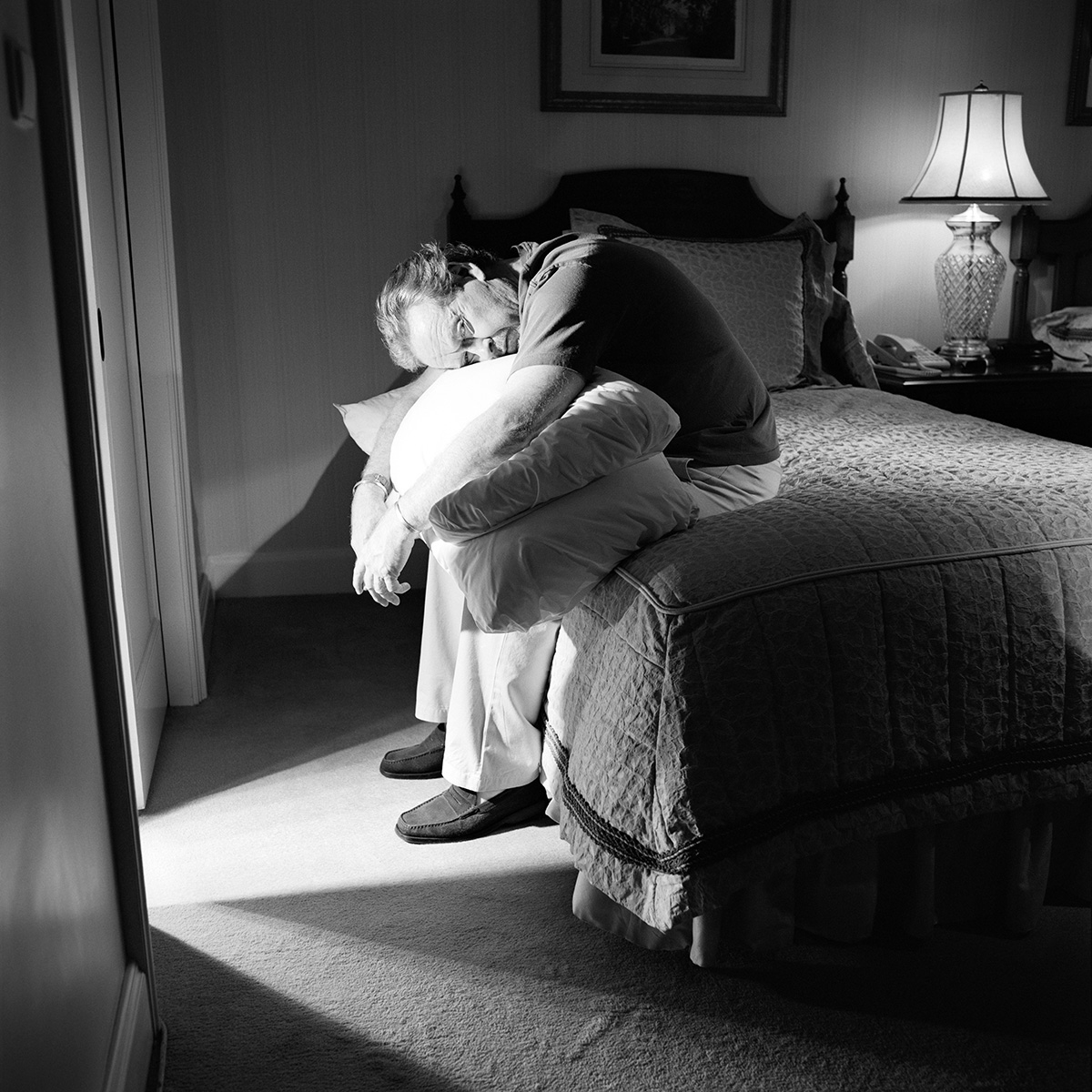
Director Ridley Scott in 2005

Ridley Scott had owned a house in Provence for fifteen years, and wanted to film a production there. Scott Free president Lisa Ellzey recommended the works of author Peter Mayle, who had written best-selling books set in the south of France. Scott and Mayle were acquaintances and neighbours, having worked together in advertising and commercials during the 1970s, but as the author did not want to write a screenplay, he instead wrote a new book after discussing a film plot with Scott. "Ridley arrived with a newspaper clipping which reported on new wines in Bordeaux – 'garage' wines – which commanded huge prices without a chateau or pedigree. Yet, people paid a fortune for them", Mayle said. "I saw this piece in the newspaper business section of the Times about a vineyard in France that was selling garage wine for over £30,000 a case," Scott recounted about the 1996 clipping, which he still keeps in his files in London. "I was looking for an excuse to come back to France to shoot a film, and this story idea offered the perfect opportunity. I bounced this idea off Peter Mayle, and he said, 'That would make a good novel'. "And I said, 'You write the book, then I'll get the film rights.' So, he wrote the book." Screenwriter Marc Klein was brought in after Scott read an adaptation he did of The Girls' Guide to Hunting and Fishing – eventually released in 2007 as Suburban Girl.

Klein had to expand and alter the story of the book to make the adaptation "more movie-like". A particular focus was to add conflict, with changes such as turning Fanny from a gentle character to a stubborn woman who starts without sympathy for Max. Another addition was the scene where Max falls in the swimming pool, which Scott said was to demonstrate "[that] the house had not let him go". The director wanted to portray Uncle Henry on screen instead of just describing him. While writer Marc Klein first suggested depicting him as a ghost, Scott's attempts at that did not work so he used flashbacks which "occur just as another scene" where it would depict "the grooming of Max as a child which will be used as payoffs for the three acts that follow".

=== Casting ===
Klein described Henry as "sounding like Albert Finney" so Scott hired the actor, with whom he had worked in The Duellists. Scott brought Russell Crowe as the protagonist Max. The actor stated that it was a good opportunity for them to reunite after 2000's Gladiator as "it just seemed more fun to go into this smaller place, where the problems weren't as vast." The character was considered a change from Crowe's usual roles, with some noting it may reflect "maturity" or "contentment", with Australia's Courier-Mail dubbing him "A Mellow Fellow". Crowe said of his life at the time: "[I'm] relaxed ... Work isn't the most important thing in my life now. It's not even in the top ten." The actor also stressed the importance of his family. Scott also stated one of the reasons for the project was that he had "not done much in the way of comedy" and it seemed to be a good opportunity to "keep challenging yourself".

Abbie Cornish did a videotaped audition for Ridley Scott only weeks before filming started. Eva Green and Vahina Giocante auditioned for the role of Fanny Chenal, which later went to Marion Cotillard.

=== Filming ===
The film was shot throughout nine weeks in 2005, mostly in locations Scott described as "eight minutes from my house". French locations were filmed at Bonnieux, Cucuron and Gordes in Vaucluse, Marseille Provence Airport, and the rail station in Avignon. London locations included Albion Riverside in Battersea, Broadgate, the Bluebird Cafe on King's Road in Chelsea, and Criterion Restaurant in Piccadilly Circus. The scene with the tennis match between Max and Duflot was added on the set, replacing an argument at the vines to provide "a battle scene". As the swimming pool on Château La Canorgue in Bonnieux did not fit the one Scott had envisioned from the scene, only the scenes outside the pool were filmed there. The one after Max had fallen was dug and concreted nearby, and the original one had its bottom replaced digitally to match. The production team could not film the wine cave from La Canorgue as they shot during the period where it was being used, so the wine cellar from a nearby hotel was turned into a cave. While southern France does not have clay courts as the weather makes them hard to maintain, Scott wanted one for its dirty and beaten-up aspect, so the tennis court was built from scratch, including posts straight from the Wimbledon courts. Fanny's cafe was shot in a Gordes restaurant, with designer Sonja Klaus decorating it with items bought from second-hand shops considering the character would have done the same. Klaus employed a kitsch decoration on Duflot's estate to show it was "a character keeping up with the Joneses – if it was in America, he would drive a golden Cadillac with leopard skin print seats" and decorated the large water basin of Cucuron with floating candles to "make it look like a fabulous event" for Max's dinner with Fanny.

=== Music ===
Marc Streitenfeld worked as a music editor on Hans Zimmer's Remote Control Productions and was invited by Scott to make his debut as a film score composer. The soundtrack includes "Moi Lolita" by Alizée, "Breezin' Along with the Breeze" by Josephine Baker, "Gotta Get Up", "Jump into the Fire", and "How Can I Be Sure of You" by Harry Nilsson, "Hey Joe" by Johnny Hallyday, "Vous, qui passez sans me voir" and "J'attendrai" by Jean Sablon, "Le chant du gardien" by Tino Rossi, "Je chante" by Charles Trenet, "Old Cape Cod" by Patti Page, "Walk Right Back" by the Everly Brothers, "Boum!" by Adrien Chevalier, and "Itsy Bitsy Petit Bikini" by Richard Anthony. The CD includes only 15 songs from the film; several are left out.

== Release ==
=== Theatrical release ===
A Good Year was theatrically released in the United Kingdom on 27 October 2006 and in the United States on 10 November 2006 by 20th Century Fox.

=== Home media ===
A Good Year was released on DVD on 27 February 2007 by 20th Century Fox Home Entertainment.

== Reception ==
=== Box office ===
A Good Year grossed $7.5 million in the United States and Canada, and $34.8 million in other territories, for a worldwide total of $42.3 million.

As of 2022, it has earned over $10 million in DVD sales in the United States.

=== Critical response ===
On the review aggregator website Rotten Tomatoes, the film holds an approval rating of 26% based on 137 reviews, with an average rating of 4.8/10. The website's critics consensus reads, "A Good Year is a fine example of a top-notch director and actor out of their elements, in a sappy romantic comedy lacking in charm and humor." Metacritic, which assigns a weighted average, gave it a score of 47 out of 100, based on reviews from 33 critics, indicating "mixed or average" reviews. Audiences polled by CinemaScore gave the film an average grade of "B+" on an A+ to F scale.

In Variety, Todd McCarthy wrote that the film is a "divertissement" that is easy to watch, but "doesn't amount to much". Stephen Holden of The New York Times called it "a three-P movie: pleasant, pretty and predictable. One might add piddling". Writing for the Los Angeles Times, Kenneth Turan said, "the fact that we know exactly what will happen [...] is not what's wrong with A Good Year. After all, we go to films like this precisely because the satisfaction of emotional certainty is what we're looking for. What we're not looking for is a romantic comedy made by individuals with no special feeling for the genre who stretch a half-hour's worth of story to nearly two hours". Comparing it to Under the Tuscan Sun, Love Actually, and Roman Holiday, Jessica Reaves of the Chicago Tribune said A Good Year was "unbearably sweet and emotionally lifeless". British film critic Peter Bradshaw wrote in The Guardian that it was "a humourless cinematic slice of tourist gastro-porn".

In a book-length study of Ridley Scott's film career, Adam Barkman summarized the general critical response to A Good Year as "lightweight as far as most critics were concerned" and that it "offer[ed] little in comparison to the combined commercial and critical success of the next venture, [American Gangster], the biopic of Harlem drug lord Frank Lucas".

In 2022, a retrospective review by Anees Aref in The Guardian said "A Good Year initially struggles to find its footing. Some early comic bits don't quite land as Scott tries to play things with a light touch, contrary to some of his more ruggedly serious output; we're not used to seeing Crowe channelling Cary Grant. But the film soon settles into a comfortable groove and becomes very entertaining – and beautiful, with southern France captured sumptuously by Scott and cinematographer Philippe Le Sourd's painterly imagery." Aref also highlights that "Scott has taken on more ambitious subjects of greater scope and weight than this, but A Good Year may be one of his most easily enjoyable and emotionally satisfying efforts, in a long career that has traversed so many times and places, in this world and others. He and Crowe have made five films together, but not since 2010. Hopefully, as rumours have periodically suggested, a sixth collaboration is in the works. For now, we have A Good Year."

=== Accolades ===
Award	Category	Recipient	Result
EDA Special Mention Award	Hall of Shame	A Good Year	Won
Critics Choice Awards	Best Young Actor	Freddie Highmore	Nominated
Satellite Awards	Best Cinematography	Philippe Le Sourd	Nominated
