= List of programmes broadcast by Cartoonito (UK and Ireland) =

The following is a partial list of programmes shown in the United Kingdom and Ireland by the TV channel, Cartoonito.

== Current programming ==
=== Acquired programming ===
==== Acquired from Warner Bros. Animation ====
- Batwheels (March 2023 – present)
- Bugs Bunny Builders (1 November 2022 – present)

==== Acquired from Cartoon Network Studios ====
- Jessica's Big Little World (18 July 2024 – present)

==== International co-productions ====
- Baby Lemmings (1 July 2026 – present)
- Grizzy & the Lemmings (5 February 2024 – present)
- Lucas the Spider (2 May 2022 – present)

==== Other ====
- Barney's World (14 October 2024 – present)
- Cocomelon (3 April 2021 – present)
- Fireman Sam (11 February 2008 – present)
- Interstellar Ella (6 November 2023 – present)
- Lu & the Bally Bunch (3 April 2023–present)
- Masha and the Bear (20 June 2016 – present)
- Mr. Bean: The Animated Series (5 February 2024 – present)
- Paddles! The Huggable Polar Bear (6 September 2021 – 24 July 2022; 1 June 2026 – present)
- Silly Sundays (2024 – present)
- Tulipop (17 June 2024 – present)

== Former programming ==
=== Original programming ===
- Ballooniville
- Cartoonito Karaoke (2008–2015)
- Cartoonito Tales (2010–2018)
- Go and Be a Grown-Up!
- Go and Get a Grown-Up!
- Ha Ha Hairies (2012–2015)
- The Happos Family (2018–2020, originally on Boomerang)
- LazyTown (series 3–4) (2012–2016)
- Make, Shake & Jake

=== Acquired programming ===
==== Acquired from Warner Bros./Hanna-Barbera ====
- Baby Looney Tunes (4 September 2006)
- Cave Kids
- Firehouse Tales (2007–2013)
- Krypto the Superdog
- A Pup Named Scooby-Doo
- The Smurfs
- Tiny Toon Adventures
- Tom & Jerry Kids

==== Other ====
- The Adventures of Chuck and Friends
- Animal Stories (4 September 2006)
- Bananas in Pyjamas (CGI series) (2011–2017)
- Barney & Friends (4 September 2006)
- Blanche (4 September 2006)
- Bob the Builder (2016–2022)
- Caillou (4 September 2006)
- Care Bears: Adventures in Care-a-lot
- Child's Farm
- Chloe's Closet
- Curious George (2018–2022)
- Daisy & Ollie (2017–2022)
- Daniel Tiger's Neighborhood
- Dive Olly, Dive
- The Doozers (2015–2017)
- Ellen's Acres (4 September 2006)
- Fluffy Gardens (4 September 2006)
- Frances (2007–09)
- Hi-5 (4 September 2006)
- Hi-5 UK
- Jelly Jamm (5 September 2011 – 17 May 2013)
- Julius Jr.
- The Land Before Time
- Legends of Spark (2022–2024)
- Little People
- Loopdidoo (season 3 only)
- Meteor and the Mighty Monster Trucks (4 September 2006)
- Miss BG
- Molang (2016–2022)
- Monkey See, Monkey Do
- Mush-Mush and the Mushables (1 March 2022 – 24 July 2022)
- Olly the Little White Van (2016–2017)
- Pip Ahoy!
- Popples (1 August 2017 – 2 March 2018)
- Pororo the Little Penguin (4 September 2006)
- Roobarb and Custard Too (4 September 2006)
- Robot Trains (2018–2022)
- Sesame Street (Autumn 2016–17)
- Simon in the Land of Chalk Drawings (January 1st 2007–2009)
- Strawberry Shortcake's Berry Bitty Adventures
- Super Wings (2016–2023) (now back on Tiny POP)
- Thomas & Friends (2017–2024)
