= Jack Wilson (pianist) =

- Born: Jack Wilson; 28 September 1907; Warwickshire, England
- Died: 12 January 2006 (aged 98)
- Occupation: jazz pianist

Jack Wilson (28 September 1907 – 12 January 2006) was a British jazz pianist. Born in Warwickshire, England, he was perhaps better known as bandleader of the Versatile Five, which he founded in 1933. Before that, he worked with Charles Shadwell and Jack Venables. Full biography page http://www.r2ok.co.uk/Jack_Wilson.htm
