= Lindsey Hill =

British television writer

Lindsey Hill is a British television writer.

Lindsey began her working life with a ten-year career as a solicitor, specialising in insolvency and fraud related litigation. Following the suicide of a man forced into bankruptcy by one of her clients in 1994, Lindsey gave up private practice in order to focus on her writing career. Since then she has written for series such as Follow The Money, Partner’s In Law, Silent Witness, Common Law, EastEnders and Madson II, all for the BBC; After Thomas, a TV drama about a boy with autism for ITV, Implicated for Channel 4, and Family Affairs and Wing & A Prayer II for FIVE.
