= A Year in Provence =

1989 memoir by Peter Mayle on life in Provence, France

- First edition
- Author: Peter Mayle
- Language: English
- Set in: Provence, France
- Publisher: Hamish Hamilton
- ISBN: 978-0-679-73114-6

A Year in Provence is a 1989 best-selling memoir by Peter Mayle about his first year in Provence, and the local events and customs. Reviewers praised the book's honest style, wit, and refreshing humour. It was adapted into a BBC Television series starring John Thaw and Lindsay Duncan.

== Plot ==
Peter Mayle and his wife move to Provence, and are soon met with unexpectedly fierce weather, underground truffle dealers and unruly workers, who work around their normalement schedule. Meals in Provençal restaurants and work on the Mayles' house, garden and vineyard are features of the book, whose chapters follow the months of the year.

== Adaptations ==
In 1991, a radio adaptation was broadcast on BBC Radio 4.

In 1993, BBC Television produced a series based on the book, starring John Thaw and Lindsay Duncan, with appearances from Alfred Molina and James Fleet. Unlike the book, the programme was not well received by critics and was later placed at number ten on a Radio Times list of the worst television programmes ever made, with John Naughton describing it as a "smugathon ... which achieved the near impossible – creating a John Thaw vehicle nobody liked".

== Sequels ==
- Toujours Provence (1991)
- Encore Provence (1999)
- French Lessons (2001)

== Cultural influence ==
Mayle's memoir provided inspiration for the 2008 satirical novel A Year in the Province by Christopher Marsh in which an Andalusian man persuades his wife and his three daughters to relocate to Belfast.
