= After Thomas =

2006 British television film

- Written by: Lindsey Hill
- Directed by: Simon Shore
- Starring: Keeley Hawes; Ben Miles; Andrew Byrne; Sheila Hancock; Duncan Preston
- Country of origin: United Kingdom
- Original language: English

Production
- Producers: Beryl Vertue; Elaine Cameron
- Running time: 93 minutes

Original release
- Network: ITV
- Release: 26 December 2006

After Thomas is a television drama film first broadcast in the United Kingdom on 26 December 2006 on ITV. It was produced by Beryl Vertue and Elaine Cameron, directed by Simon Shore, and written by Lindsey Hill. It follows a severely autistic child Kyle Graham and the progress he makes when his parents adopt Thomas, a Golden Retriever. It is based on the true story of Scottish child Dale Gardner and his dog Henry.

== Plot ==
Kyle Graham is a severely autistic child with limited communication skills, has intense meltdowns and is not toilet-trained. His condition tests the patience of his parents Nicola and Rob.

Nicola believes that the symptoms of Kyle's autism can be made less severe over time by attempting to integrate him with the world around him. Rob, however, believes that the best solution is to send Kyle to a specialist boarding school run by the charismatic and caring headteacher John Havers. Rob, who has not had sex with his wife for years, becomes more torn when family friend Rachel offers him casual sex. Nicola's only respite is the unwavering support of her mother Pat and father Jim, who dote on Kyle and provide practical support when needed.

Open–minded on autism therapies, Nicola reads about a child whose condition improved with the help of a therapy dog; Rob remains skeptical, believing that Kyle will either be terrified of the dog or oblivious to its existence. Kyle names his Golden Retriever puppy Thomas after Thomas the Tank Engine. Slowly, through Thomas, he learns about emotions and interpersonal relationships. Rob discovers that he can quell his son's tantrums by speaking in a different voice that Kyle believes is that of Thomas. Rob and Nicola's marriage improves and she becomes pregnant with her second child. Thomas falls ill and the couple fear that if the dog should die, their son will regress. However, he makes a full recovery. In the final scene of the film, Kyle acknowledges his parents for the first time and says that he loves them.

Before the credits, an epilogue shows what happened to the real-life counterparts portrayed as characters in the film. The real-life Kyle now plays in a pop punk band called Firing at Statues.

== Cast ==
- Keeley Hawes as Nicola Graham
- Ben Miles as Rob Graham
- Andrew Byrne as Kyle Graham
- Sheila Hancock as Grandma Pat
- Duncan Preston as Grandpa Jim
- Asa Butterfield as Andrew
- Clive Mantle as John Havers
- Lorraine Pilkington as Rachel
- Noma Dumezweni as Paula Murray
- Gill Hutley as a Class Teacher

== Reception ==
Moviemail called After Thomas "gritty, warm and funny, but above all else is a realistic insight into every parent's worst nightmare."

Dr Joyce Almeida wrote in a review on the website of the Royal College of Psychiatrists that the film "offers an excellent platform for anyone wanting to learn about the subject of autism and the spectrum of disorders associated with it" and noted its potential as a teaching tool.
