= Peter Mayle =

British businessman and writer (1939–2018)

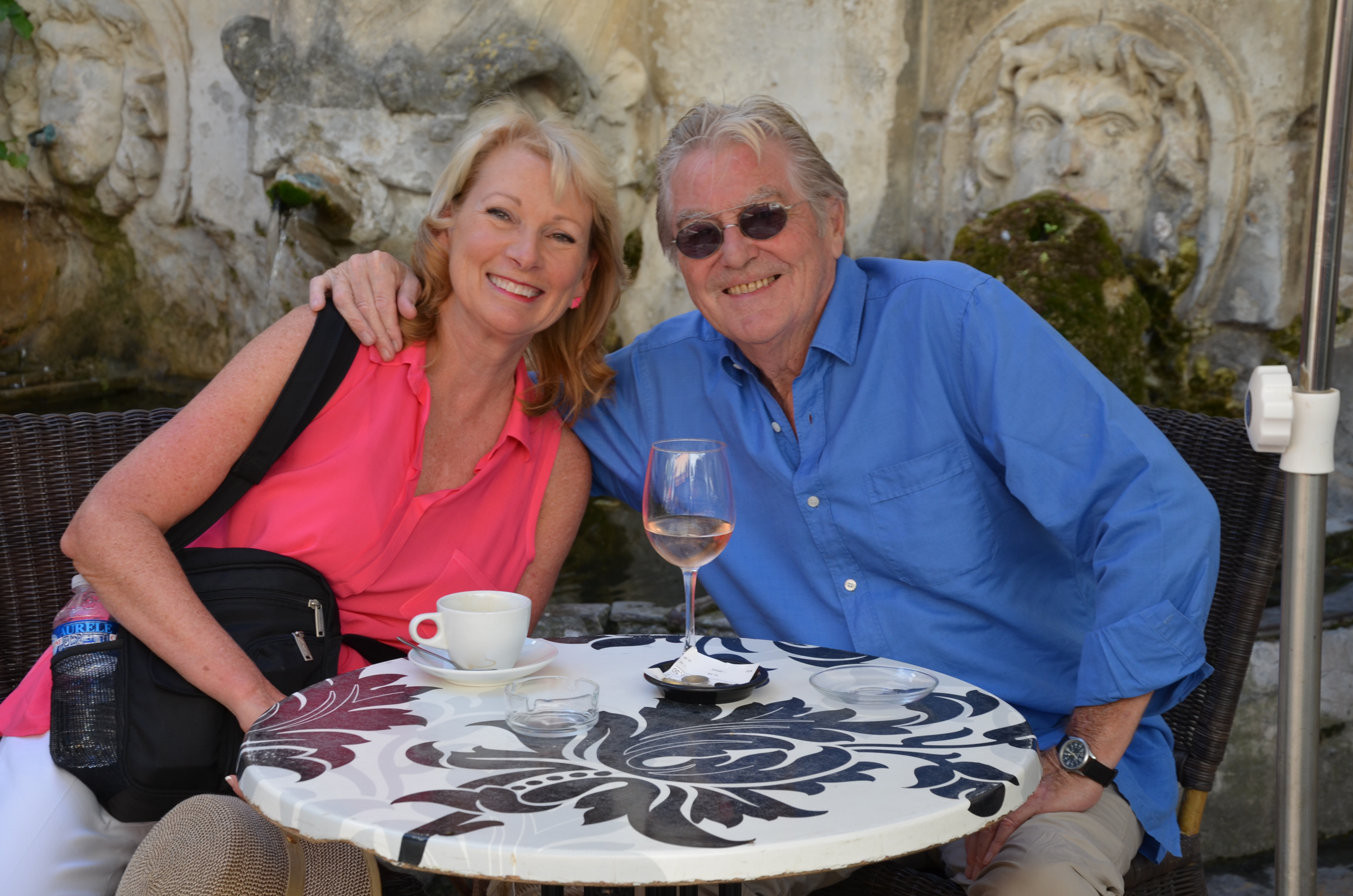
- Born: 14 June 1939; Brighton, England
- Died: 18 January 2018 (aged 78); Aix-en-Provence, France
- Occupations: Writer (advertising, travel, children's non-fiction)
- Known for: Memoirs
- Spouse: Jennie (third wife)
- Children: 3 sons from first marriage 2 daughters from second

Peter Mayle (/meɪl/ "mail"; 14 June 1939 – 18 January 2018) was a British businessman turned author who moved to France in the 1980s. He wrote a series of bestselling memoirs of his life there, beginning with A Year in Provence (1989).

== Early life ==
Born in Brighton, Sussex, the youngest of three children, Mayle and his parents moved to Barbados in the aftermath of World War II, where his father was transferred as a Colonial Office employee. Mayle returned to England after leaving school at 16 in Barbados.

== Advertising career ==
His first job in 1957 was as a trainee at Shell Oil, based in its London office. It was there that he discovered that he was more interested in advertising than oil and he wrote to David Ogilvy, the head of the advertising agency that had the Shell account at that time, asking for a job. Ogilvy offered him a job as a junior account executive, but Mayle's interest was more on the creative side of the business and he subsequently became a copywriter in 1961 based in its New York City office.

In due course another agency, Papert Koenig, Lois, poached him from Ogilvy and sent him back to London to head up the creative team in its UK office, where one of his colleagues was Alan Parker. When the US parent hit trouble in the mid-1960s, he and a colleague bought the London operation. They developed the business with accounts that included Watneys, Olivetti, and Sony and after five years, it was bought by BBDO, one of the top American agencies. He then commuted between the U.S. and the UK as its creative director.

A 1972 advertising slogan written by Mayle for Wonderloaf Bread was used as a football chant by supporters of Tottenham Hotspur, and became the basis of the song "Nice One Cyril".

By 1974, Mayle had had enough of advertising and transatlantic commuting, and quit the business to write full-time.

== Author ==
Mayle started off by writing educational books, including a series on sex education for children and young people. He also penned, in collaboration with illustrator Gray Jolliffe, a series of humorous books about the character Wicked Willie, based upon a personification of the penis. He relocated from Devon to the Luberon, southern France, in the late 80s but his plans to write a novel were overtaken by an account of life in his new environment. This resulted in his 1989 book A Year in Provence which became an international bestseller, chronicling his first year as a British expatriate in Ménerbes, a village in the southern département Vaucluse.

Several more books followed, which have been translated in more than twenty languages. He also wrote for magazines and newspapers. A Year in Provence was subsequently produced as a TV series starring John Thaw and screened in 1993. The novel A Good Year was the basis for the 2006 film of the same name directed by Ridley Scott and starring actors Russell Crowe and Marion Cotillard.

Mayle relocated to Amagansett on Long Island, New York, to get away from fans and sightseers at his home in Provence. He subsequently returned to France and at the time of his death in 2018 resided in Vaugines, also situated in the Luberon, in Provence. He died at the hospital near his home in January 2018. The last six years of his life were made difficult by a bad fall that injured his left hand, making it difficult for the left-handed Mayle to write his final books.

== Awards ==
British Book Awards named A Year in Provence Best Travel Book of the Year (1989) and him Author of the Year (1992). The French government made him a Chevalier de la Légion d'honneur (Knight of the Legion of Honor) in 2002, for coopération et francophonie.

== Bibliography ==
- Where Did I Come From? The Facts of Life Without Any Nonsense and with Illustrations, illustrated by Arthur Robins and Paul Walter, Carol Publishing Group (Secaucus, NJ), 1973.
- What's Happening to Me? The Answers to Some of the World's Most Embarrassing Questions, illustrated by Arthur Robins and Paul Walter, Carol Publishing Group (Secaucus, NJ), 1975.
- Will I Go to Heaven?, Corwin, 1976.
- "Will I Like It?": Your First Sexual Experience, What to Expect, What to Avoid, and How Both of You Can Get the Most Out of It, photographs by John Thornton, Corwin, 1977.
- How to Be a Pregnant Father: An Illustrated Survival Guide for the First-time Father, illustrated by Arthur Robins, Lyle Stuart, Inc. (Secaucus, NJ), 1977.
- Baby Taming, illustrated by Arthur Robins, Crown (New York), 1978.
- Divorce Can Happen to the Nicest People, illustrated by Arthur Robins, Macmillan (New York), 1979, revised edition published as Why Are We Getting a Divorce?, Crown (New York), 1988.
- (With Paul Rice) As Dead as a Dodo, illustrated by Shawn Rice, David Godine (Boston, MA), 1981.
- (With Arthur Robins) Congratulations! You're Not Pregnant: An Illustrated Guide to Birth Control, Macmillan Publishers (New York), 1981.
- (With Arthur Robins) Grown-ups and Other Problems: Help for Small People in a Big World, Macmillan (New York), 1982.
- The Honeymoon Book, illustrated by Gray Jolliffe, Ballantine Books (New York), 1983.
- Chilly Billy, illustrated by Arthur Robins, Crown (New York), 1980.
- Man's Best Friend: Introducing Wicked Willie in the Title Role, illustrated by Gray Jolliffe, Crown (New York), 1984.
- Anything but Rover—the Art and Science of Naming Your Dog: A Breed by Breed Guide, Including Mongrels, illustrated by Arthur Robins, A. Barker, 1985.
- Sweet Dreams and Monsters: A Beginner's Guide to Dreams and Nightmares and Things That Go Bump under the Bed, illustrated by Arthur Robins, Crown (New York), 1986.
- Wicked Willie's Guide to Women: A Worm's-Eye View of the Fair Sex, illustrated by Gray Jolliffe, Pan Books (London), 1986, Crown (New York), 1987.
- Wicked Willie's Low-Down on Men, illustrated by Gray Jolliffe, Pan Books (London), 1987.
- Wicked Willie's Guide to Women: The Further Adventures of Man's Best Friend, illustrated by Gray Jolliffe, Crown (New York), 1988.
- A Year in Provence, Hamish Hamilton (London, England), 1989, published with illustrations by Judith Clancy, Alfred A. Knopf (New York), 1990.
- (With Raffaella Fletcher) Dangerous Candy: A True Drug Story by Someone Who Did Them and Kicked Them, Sinclair-Stevenson (London, England), 1990, published as Dangerous Candy: A True Story about Drug Addiction, Trafalgar Square Publishing (Pomfret, Vermont), 1991.
- Toujours Provence, Knopf (New York), 1991.
- Acquired Tastes: A Beginner's Guide to Serious Pleasures, Bantam Books (New York), 1992.
- Up the Agency: The Funny Business of Advertising, St. Martin's Press (New York), 1993.
- Hotel Pastis: A Novel of Provence, Knopf (New York), 1993.
- Provence, photographs by Jason Hawkes, Random House (New York), 1994.
- A Dog's Life, with Ed Koren, Knopf (New York), 1995.
- Anything Considered, Knopf (New York), 1996.
- Chasing Cézanne, Knopf (New York), 1997.
- Where Did I Come From? The Facts of Life Without Any Nonsense and with Illustrations, illustrated by Arthur Robins and Paul Walter; African-American edition published with illustrations adapted by Zina Saunders, Carol Publishing Group (Secaucus, NJ), 1999.
- Encore Provence: New Adventures in the South of France, Knopf (New York), 1999.
- French Lessons: Adventures with Knife, Fork, and Corkscrew, Knopf (New York), 2001.
- A Good Year (novel), Knopf (New York), 2004.
- (With Gerard Auzet) Confessions of a French Baker: Breadmaking Secrets, Tips, and Recipes, Knopf (New York), 2005.
- Provence A–Z, Knopf (New York), 2006.
- The Vintage Caper, Knopf (New York), 2009
- The Marseille Caper, Knopf (New York) 2012
- The Corsican Caper, Knopf (New York), 2014
- The Diamond Caper, Knopf (New York), 2015
- Provence in Ten Easy Lessons, Random House, 2014 – adapted from Provence A–Z: A Francophile's Essential Handbook
- My Twenty-Five Years in Provence: Reflections on Then and Now, Knopf (New York), 2018

Contributions

- (Author of introduction, with Ridley Scott) A Good Year: Portrait of the Film Based on the Novel by Peter Mayle, Newmarket Press (New York), 2007.
- (with Gray Jolliffe), screenplay Wicked Willie
- Contributor of articles to periodicals, including
  - The Sunday Times
  - Financial Times
  - Independent
  - Esquire
- contributor to Adventures in Wine, edited by Thom Elkjer, Travelers' Tales (San Francisco, CA), 2002.
- column, "Expensive Habits", Gentleman's Quarterly
- Media adaptations:
  - A Year in Provence was adapted for audio cassette, Books on Tape, 1992, and for television by the British Broadcasting Corporation
  - French Lessons: Adventures with Knife, Fork, and Corkscrew was adapted for audio cassette
  - A Good Year was adapted to film
  - What's Happening to Me? adapted as animated video
  - Where Did I Come From? adapted as animated video
