= Daybreak presenters and reporters =

This article shows the on air team members for the ITV Breakfast programme Daybreak which began broadcasting in the United Kingdom on 6 September 2010.

On 9 July 2010 it was announced ITV would rebrand GMTV as Daybreak. On 31 August 2010 the new presenting line-up was announced. On 5 December 2011 original presenters Christine Bleakley and Adrian Chiles were "axed" from the programme. On 11 June 2012, it was announced the programme would undergo a new look and presenting team.

On 3 March 2014 it was announced that Sean Fletcher, Charlotte Hawkins, Susanna Reid and Ben Shephard would become presenters on the new ITV Breakfast programme Good Morning Britain.

Presenters
Role	Daybreak & The Daybreak NewsHour					
Role	2010	2011	2012 (January – August)	2012 (September – December)	2013	2014
Lead Presenter	Adrian Chiles	Adrian Chiles	Dan Lobb	Aled Jones	Aled Jones	Aled Jones
Lead Presenter	Christine Bleakley	Christine Bleakley	Kate Garraway	Lorraine Kelly	Lorraine Kelly	Lorraine Kelly
Main Presenter	John Stapleton	John Stapleton	John Stapleton	John Stapleton	John Stapleton	John Stapleton
Main Presenter	Kate Garraway	Kate Garraway		Kate Garraway	Kate Garraway	Kate Garraway
Main Presenter				Matt Barbet	Matt Barbet	Matt Barbet
Main Presenter				Ranvir Singh	Ranvir Singh	Ranvir Singh
Newsreader	Tasmin Lucia-Khan	Tasmin Lucia-Khan	Lucy Watson	Ranvir Singh	Ranvir Singh	Ranvir Singh
Health Editor	Dr Hilary Jones	Dr Hilary Jones	Dr Hilary Jones	Dr Hilary Jones	Dr Hilary Jones	Dr Hilary Jones
Weather	Lucy Verasamy	Lucy Verasamy	Lucy Verasamy	Laura Tobin	Laura Tobin	Laura Tobin
Weather	Kirsty McCabe (until February)	Kirsty McCabe (until February)	Kirsty McCabe (until February)	Laura Tobin	Laura Tobin	Laura Tobin
Weather	Alex Beresford (Relief)	Alex Beresford (Relief)	Alex Beresford (Relief)	Alex Beresford (Relief)	Alex Beresford (Relief)	Alex Beresford (Relief)
Entertainment Editor	Kate Garraway	Kate Garraway	Kate Garraway (until June)	Richard Arnold	Richard Arnold	Richard Arnold
Entertainment Editor	Kate Garraway	Kate Garraway	Richard Arnold (June onwards)	Richard Arnold	Richard Arnold	Richard Arnold
Entertainment Correspondent	Steve Hargrave	Steve Hargrave	Steve Hargrave			
Los Angeles Correspondent	Ross King	Ross King	Ross King	Ross King	Ross King	Ross King

Note: In addition to the dedicated Daybreak reporters and correspondents listed below, ITV News and regional ITV journalists appeared for supporting or relief purposes

Correspondents
Year	Correspondents	Title(s)	Note(s)
2012—14	Richard Arnold	Showbiz Editor	
2010—14	Carla Eberhardt	News Correspondent	Former New York Correspondent
2010—14	Nick Dixon	Features Correspondent	Former New York Correspondent
2010—13	Gregg Easteal	North of England Correspondent	
2013—14	Gamal Fahnbulleh	North of England Correspondent	
2012—14	Katy Fawcett	Midlands Correspondent	
2010—14	Richard Gaisford	Chief Correspondent	
2010—12	Steve Hargrave	Entertainment Correspondent	
2012—14	Louisa James	News Correspondent	Stand-in presenter/newsreader
2010—14	Sue Jameson	Political Editor	
2010—14	Dr. Hilary Jones	Health Editor	
2012—14	Gethin Jones	Features Reporter	
2010—14	Ross King	Los Angeles Correspondent	
2010—14	Cordelia Kretzschmar	Senior News Correspondent	Stand-in newsreader
2010—14	Michelle Morrison	North America Correspondent	
2013—14	Helen Carnell	News Correspondent	
2010—12	Gavin Ramjaun	Sports Correspondent	
2010—12	Phil Reay-Smith	Consumer Editor	
2010—14	Tiffany Royce	News Correspondent	
2010—11	Gráinne Seoige	Features Editor	Stand-in presenter
2010—14	John Stapleton	Special Correspondent	Stand-in presenter
2010—14	Jonathan Swain	Senior News Correspondent	
2013—14	Philippa Tomson	News Correspondent	
2010—11; 2012; 2012—14	Lucy Watson	News Correspondent; Interim newsreader New York Correspondent	

Guest on air staff
Year	Guest on air staff	Title(s)	Note(s)
2013	Natalie Anderson	Showbiz presenter	1 episode
2010	Andrea Byrne	Newsreader	5 episodes
2013	Keith Chegwin	Reporter	1 episode
2012	Rylan Clark	Showbiz presenter	
2012	Ali Douglas	Newsreader	1 episode
2010	Katy Hill	Presenter	
2013	Marvin Humes	Entertainment Correspondent	
2011	Gethin Jones	Features reporter	
2010	Lucy Kite	Weather presenter	1 episode
2010	John Prescott	Party Conference reporter	
2010	Adam Rickitt	Party Conference reporter	
2011	Keir Simmons	Relief presenter	4 episodes
2013	Louie Spence	Showbiz presenter	
2010, 2011	Fred Talbot	Weather presenter	2 episodes
2010	Philippa Tomson	Weather presenter	1 episode
2011	Anna Williamson	Entertainment reporter Showbiz presenter	

Presenters history

Years	Monday—Thursday	Friday
2010—11	Christine Bleakley and Adrian Chiles
2011	Christine Bleakley and Adrian Chiles	Kate Garraway and Dan Lobb
2011—12	Kate Garraway and Dan Lobb
2012—14	Matt Barbet and Ranvir Singh (0600—0700)
2012—14	Lorraine Kelly and Aled Jones (0700—0830)	Kate Garraway and Aled Jones (0700—0830)
