= List of Good Morning Britain presenters =

This is a list of the on-air team members for the ITV Breakfast programme Good Morning Britain which began broadcasting in the United Kingdom on 28 April 2014.

Good Morning Britain launched on 28 April 2014 following the cancellation of Daybreak with seven main presenters – Susanna Reid, Kate Garraway, Ben Shephard, Charlotte Hawkins, Ranvir Singh, Sean Fletcher and John Stapleton, with weather bulletins presented by Laura Tobin, entertainment news delivered by Richard Arnold and sports news presented by Fletcher.

Reid, Shephard and Hawkins all presented four days a week, with Fletcher presenting every day, Stapleton presenting every Wednesday, Garraway presenting every Thursday and Singh presenting every Friday. Garraway and Singh also acted as relief presenters.

In January 2015, the show's format changed to featuring just two main presenters with one newsreader. Shephard and Reid remained the main presenters with Reid continuing to present everyday except Friday and Shephard continuing to present everyday except Wednesday. Garraway began presenting on Wednesdays and Fridays while also taking the newsreader position on Mondays and Tuesdays. Stapleton read the news on Wednesdays with Singh taking the position on Thursdays and Fridays. Fletcher acted as a stand-in newsreader.

In June 2015, following a six-month absence due to maternity leave, Hawkins returned to the show as a newsreader Monday-Wednesday and also acts as a stand-in presenter in the absence of Reid, Shephard or Garraway.

In September 2015, Shephard reduced his weekly appearances to two, presenting on Thursdays and Fridays. Garraway then presented everyday except Thursday until Piers Morgan joined the show as a main presenter alongside Reid presenting Monday-Wednesday in November of the same year. This presenting line up of Morgan, Reid, Shephard and Garraway then remained the same until March 2021, when Morgan left the programme due to comments he made about Meghan Markle. He was initially replaced by a series of guest and stand-in presenters.

From March to July 2020, due to the COVID-19 pandemic, sister show Lorraine was cancelled so presenter Lorraine Kelly joined as the host of the new fourth hour of Good Morning Britain.

In January 2022, having not replaced Morgan with a permanent presenter ten months after his departure, it was announced that Reid would be head presenter of the show and would permanently be joined be a series of rotating presenters Monday-Wednesday. Richard Madeley signed a £300,000 contract the same month to become a permanent rotating presenter, having first appeared as a guest presenter in August 2017. In July 2022, Ed Balls became a permanent rotating presenter, having first appeared as a guest presenter in November 2021.

On 16 February 2024, it was announced that Shephard would be leaving the show to become the permanent presenter on This Morning. He presented his final show on 23 February 2024. After Shephard's departure, rotating presenters Madeley and Balls moved to a four day slot; they alternate fortnightly to present alongside Reid or Garraway Monday–Thursday. From March 2024 to December 2025, Adil Ray and Robert Rinder alternated to present the Friday shows alongside Garraway.

In January 2026, alongside the move of studio, Balls, hosting Monday to Wednesday, and Madeley, hosting on Thursdays, became main presenters. Alongside this, Friday shows would be presented by Garraway and Singh, giving the show five main presenters.

Reid acts as the lead presenter.

== Presenters ==
The show has five main presenters, with Susanna Reid acting as the lead.

Tenure	Person	Role
Main
2014–	Susanna Reid	Monday–Wednesday and Thursday (alternate)
2014–	Kate Garraway	Thursday (alternate) and Friday
2026–	Ed Balls	Monday–Wednesday
2026–	Richard Madeley	Thursday
2026–	Ranvir Singh	Friday
Stand-in
2015–	Charlotte Hawkins	Holiday cover

=== Former ===
Tenure	Person	Role
2014–2024	Ben Shephard	Thursday–Friday
2014–2022	Sean Fletcher	Monday–Friday
2014–2015	John Stapleton	Wednesday
2015–2021	Piers Morgan	Monday–Wednesday
2020	Lorraine Kelly	Monday–Friday 9am-10am (During the COVID-19 pandemic in the United Kingdom)
2024–2025	Adil Ray	Friday (rotating)
2024–2025	Robert Rinder	Friday (rotating)

=== Guest ===
Date(s)	Presenter	Episode(s)
13–17 April 2015	Piers Morgan	5
8 May 2015	Tom Bradby	1 (from 9am)
28–30 March 2016	Jeremy Kyle	3
4–5 April 2016	Jeremy Kyle	2
7–9 August 2017	Jeremy Kyle	3
14–16 August 2017	Jeremy Kyle	3
21–23 August 2017	Jeremy Kyle	3
12–14 February 2018	Jeremy Kyle	3
20–22 August 2018	Jeremy Kyle	3
27–28 August 2018	Jeremy Kyle	2
6 May 2019	Jeremy Kyle	1
6–8 April 2016	Mark Austin	3
31 May – 1 June 2016	Mark Austin	2
30 May 2016	Sean Fletcher	1
17 August 2018	Sean Fletcher	1
6 August 2019	Sean Fletcher	1
13–14 August 2020	Sean Fletcher	2
27–28 August 2020	Sean Fletcher	2
31 August 2020	Sean Fletcher	1
29–31 December 2020	Sean Fletcher	3
23 April 2021	Sean Fletcher	1
3 May 2021	Sean Fletcher	1
5–6 August 2021	Sean Fletcher	2
30–31 August 2021	Sean Fletcher	2
29 August 2022	Sean Fletcher	1
20 August 2024	Sean Fletcher	1
10–13 April 2017	Eamonn Holmes	4
31 July – 2 August 2017	Eamonn Holmes	3
31 August – 1 September 2017	Eamonn Holmes	2
9–12 April 2018	Eamonn Holmes	4
30 July–1 August 2018	Eamonn Holmes	3
15–16 August 2018	Eamonn Holmes	2
17–18 August 2017	Richard Madeley	2
24–25 August 2017	Richard Madeley	2
28–30 August 2017	Richard Madeley	3
18–20 October 2017	Richard Madeley	3
23–25 October 2017	Richard Madeley	3
30 October – 1 November 2017	Richard Madeley	3
15–16 February 2018	Richard Madeley	2
26–28 March 2018	Richard Madeley	3
28 May–1 June 2018	Richard Madeley	5
31 October – 1 November 2018	Richard Madeley	2
11–12 February 2019	Richard Madeley	2
18–20 February 2019	Richard Madeley	3
8–10 April 2019	Richard Madeley	3
15–17 April 2019	Richard Madeley	3
22–24 April 2019	Richard Madeley	3
27–29 May 2019	Richard Madeley	3
12–14 August 2019	Richard Madeley	3
22–23 August 2019	Richard Madeley	2
26–28 August 2019	Richard Madeley	3
17–18 February 2020	Richard Madeley	2
3–4 June 2021	Richard Madeley	2
7–9 June 2021	Richard Madeley	3
14–16 June 2021	Richard Madeley	3
5–6 July 2021	Richard Madeley	2
12–15 July 2021	Richard Madeley	4
22–23 July 2021	Richard Madeley	2
13–15 September 2021	Richard Madeley	3
20–22 September 2021	Richard Madeley	3
11–13 October 2021	Richard Madeley	3
18–20 October 2021	Richard Madeley	3
25–27 October 2021	Richard Madeley	3
1–3 November 2021	Richard Madeley	3
13–14 August 2018	Adil Ray	2
30–31 August 2018	Adil Ray	2
29–31 October 2018	Adil Ray	2
21–22 February 2019	Adil Ray	2
11–12 April 2019	Adil Ray	2
18–19 April 2019	Adil Ray	2
30–31 May 2019	Adil Ray	2
25–26 July 2019	Adil Ray	2
1–2 August 2019	Adil Ray	2
8–9 August 2019	Adil Ray	2
15–16 August 2019	Adil Ray	2
29–31 October 2019	Adil Ray	3
23–24 December 2019	Adil Ray	2
30–31 December 2019	Adil Ray	2
19–21 February 2020	Adil Ray	3
19 March 2020	Adil Ray	1
16–17 July 2020	Adil Ray	2
23–24 July 2020	Adil Ray	2
30–31 July 2020	Adil Ray	2
6–7 August 2020	Adil Ray	2
10–12 August 2020	Adil Ray	3
17–19 August 2020	Adil Ray	3
24–26 August 2020	Adil Ray	3
10 September 2020	Adil Ray	1
1–2 October 2020	Adil Ray	2
26–28 October 2020	Adil Ray	3
21–22 December 2020	Adil Ray	2
25 March 2021	Adil Ray	1
5–7 April 2021	Adil Ray	3
13–14 April 2021	Adil Ray	2
19–22 April 2021	Adil Ray	4
26–28 April 2021	Adil Ray	3
4–6 May 2021	Adil Ray	3
17–19 May 2021	Adil Ray	3
31 May–2 June 2021	Adil Ray	3
17–18 June 2021	Adil Ray	2
21–23 June 2021	Adil Ray	3
1–2 July 2021	Adil Ray	2
21–22 October 2021	Adil Ray	2
28–29 October 2021	Adil Ray	2
22–24 November	Adil Ray	3
8 December 2021	Adil Ray	1
13–15 December 2021	Adil Ray	3
20–21 December 2021	Adil Ray	2
19 January 2022	Adil Ray	1
26 January 2022	Adil Ray	1
2 February 2022	Adil Ray	1
28 February – 1 March 2022	Adil Ray	2
23 March 2022	Adil Ray	1
7–8 April 2022	Adil Ray	2
14–15 April 2022	Adil Ray	2
18–20 April 2022	Adil Ray	3
2–3 June 2022	Adil Ray	2
16–17 June 2022	Adil Ray	2
23–24 June 2022	Adil Ray	2
27–29 June 2022	Adil Ray	3
11–12 August 2022	Adil Ray	2
25–26 August 2022	Adil Ray	2
30–31 August 2022	Adil Ray	2
20–21 October 2022	Adil Ray	2
27–28 October 2022	Adil Ray	2
15 December 2022	Adil Ray	1
19–21 December 2022	Adil Ray	3
26–27 January 2023	Adil Ray	2
9–10 February 2023	Adil Ray	2
30 March 2023	Adil Ray	1
6–7 April 2023	Adil Ray	2
20–21 April 2023	Adil Ray	2
27–28 April 2023	Adil Ray	2
11–12 May 2023	Adil Ray	2
17–18 August 2023	Adil Ray	2
24–25 August 2023	Adil Ray	2
26–27 October 2023	Adil Ray	2
16 February 2024	Adil Ray	1
19 February 2026	Adil Ray	1
9 April 2026	Adil Ray	1
2 July 2026	Adil Ray	1
9 July 2026	Adil Ray	1
30–31 July 2026	Adil Ray	2
6–7 August 2026	Adil Ray	2
27–28 August 2026	Adil Ray	2
25–26 April 2019	Richard Bacon	2
8 July 2019	Richard Bacon	1
19–21 August 2019	Richard Bacon	3
29–30 August 2019	Richard Bacon	2
18–20 August 2021	Richard Bacon	3
23 August 2021	Richard Bacon	1
22–24 December 2021	Richard Bacon	3
4–5 January 2022	Richard Bacon	2
21–22 April 2022	Richard Bacon	2
24–26 February 2020	Bill Turnbull	3
24–26 May 2021	Bill Turnbull	3
20–21 August 2020	Alex Beresford	2
17–18 September 2020	Alex Beresford	2
23–24 December 2020	Alex Beresford	2
18–19 February 2021	Alex Beresford	2
26 March 2021	Alex Beresford	1
2 April 2021	Alex Beresford	1
7 May 2021	Alex Beresford	1
29–30 July 2021	Alex Beresford	2
27 August 2021	Alex Beresford	1
10–12 May 2021	Alastair Campbell	3
7–9 July 2021	Alastair Campbell	3
4–6 October 2021	Alastair Campbell	3
11–13 October 2021	Alastair Campbell	3
28–30 June 2021	Martin Lewis	3
9–10 September 2021	Martin Lewis	2
8–9 November 2021	Martin Lewis	2
6–7 December 2021	Martin Lewis	2
21–22 March 2022	Martin Lewis	2
30 March 2022	Martin Lewis	1
9 May 2022	Martin Lewis	1
5 September 2022	Martin Lewis	1
14 September 2022	Martin Lewis	1
21 September 2022	Martin Lewis	1
3 October 2022	Martin Lewis	1
10 October 2022	Martin Lewis	1
30 November 2022	Martin Lewis	1
7 December 2022	Martin Lewis	1
14 December 2022	Martin Lewis	1
29 March 2023	Martin Lewis	1
19 April 2023	Martin Lewis	1
3 May 2023	Martin Lewis	1
17 May 2023	Martin Lewis	1
25 May 2023	Martin Lewis	1
28 June 2023	Martin Lewis	1
19 July 2023	Martin Lewis	1
20 March 2024	Martin Lewis	1
8 May 2024	Martin Lewis	1
22 May 2024	Martin Lewis	1
5 June 2024	Martin Lewis	1
26 June 2024	Martin Lewis	1
26 September 2024	Martin Lewis	1
9 October 2024	Martin Lewis	1
1 April 2025	Martin Lewis	1
14 May 2025	Martin Lewis	1
25 June 2025	Martin Lewis	1
9 July 2025	Martin Lewis	1
15 October 2025	Martin Lewis	1
17 June 2026	Martin Lewis	1
10 November 2021	Robert Rinder	1
1 December 2021	Robert Rinder	1
2 March 2022	Robert Rinder	1
15–17 August 2022	Robert Rinder	3
22–24 August 2022	Robert Rinder	3
5–6 December 2022	Robert Rinder	2
28 December 2022	Robert Rinder	1
13 February 2023	Robert Rinder	1
31 August – 1 September 2023	Robert Rinder	2
2 February 2024	Robert Rinder	1
26 March 2026	Robert Rinder	1
4 May 2026	Robert Rinder	1
29 May 2026	Robert Rinder	1
16 July 2026	Robert Rinder	1
24 July 2026	Robert Rinder	1
15–17 November 2021	Ed Balls	3
24–25 January 2022	Ed Balls	2
31 January – 1 February 2022	Ed Balls	2
25–26 April 2022	Ed Balls	2
18–19 August 2022	Paul Brand	2
22 November 2024	Paul Brand	1
29 November 2024	Paul Brand	1
10 January 2025	Paul Brand	1
17–18 November 2025	Paul Brand	2
5 March 2026	Paul Brand	1
12 March 2026	Paul Brand	1
30 March–1 April 2026	Paul Brand	3
22 May 2026	Paul Brand	1
4 June 2026	Paul Brand	1
11 June 2026	Paul Brand	1
29–30 December 2022	Gordon Smart	2
13–15 August 2024	Trisha Goddard	3
25–27 May 2026	Tom Swarbrick	3
13 August 2026	Tom Swarbrick	1
20 August 2026	Tom Swarbrick	1

== Newsreaders ==
Tenure	Person	Role
Main
2014–	Kate Garraway	Monday, Tuesday (alternate) and Friday (alternate)
2014–	Ranvir Singh	Tuesday (alternate), Wednesday–Thursday and Friday (alternate)
Stand-in
2015–	Sean Fletcher	Holiday cover
2026–	Charlotte Hawkins	Holiday cover

== Other significant studio-based on-air staff ==
Tenure	Person	Role
Main
2014–	Laura Tobin	Metereologist
2014–	Andi Peters	Competition announcer
2014–	Richard Arnold	Entertainment presenter
2021–	Dr Amir Khan	Health editor
Stand-in
2014–	Alex Beresford	Meteorologist
2022–	Ruth Dodsworth	Meteorologist
2023–	Radzi Chinyanganya	Entertainment presenter
2026–	Chris Page	Meteorologist

== News correspondents and reporter producers ==
Tenure	Person	Role
2014–	Jonathan Swain	Senior news correspondent
2014–	Nick Dixon	News correspondent
2014–	Ross King	Los Angeles correspondent
2014–	Michelle Morrison	Reporter producer
2016–	Tom Barton	Reporter producer
2016–	Divya Kohli	Reporter producer
2017–	Lorna Shaddick	Reporter producer
2021–	Will Denselow	News correspondent
2022–	Louisa James	Political correspondent
2025–	Amelia Beckett	North of England correspondent
2026–	Ashna Hurynag	News correspondent

== Yearly presenter schedule ==
Years	Monday	Tuesday	Wednesday	Thursday	Friday
April–December 2014	Susanna Reid, Ben Shephard, Charlotte Hawkins and Sean Fletcher		Susanna Reid, John Stapleton, Charlotte Hawkins and Sean Fletcher	Susanna Reid, Ben Shephard, Kate Garraway and Sean Fletcher	Charlotte Hawkins, Ben Shephard, Ranvir Singh and Sean Fletcher
January–June 2015	Susanna Reid and Ben Shephard with Kate Garraway		Susanna Reid and Kate Garraway with John Stapleton	Susanna Reid and Ben Shephard with Ranvir Singh	Ben Shephard and Kate Garraway with Ranvir Singh
June–September 2015	Susanna Reid and Ben Shephard with Charlotte Hawkins		Susanna Reid and Kate Garraway with Charlotte Hawkins	Susanna Reid and Ben Shephard with Ranvir Singh	Ben Shephard and Kate Garraway with Ranvir Singh
September–November 2015	Susanna Reid and Kate Garraway with Charlotte Hawkins			Susanna Reid and Ben Shephard with Ranvir Singh	Ben Shephard and Kate Garraway with Ranvir Singh
November 2015 – January 2017	Susanna Reid and Piers Morgan with Charlotte Hawkins			Susanna Reid and Ben Shephard with Kate Garraway	Ben Shephard and Kate Garraway with Ranvir Singh
January 2017 – December 2019	Susanna Reid and Piers Morgan with Charlotte Hawkins			Susanna Reid and Ben Shephard with Kate Garraway	Ben Shephard and Kate Garraway with Charlotte Hawkins
January–March 2020	Susanna Reid and Piers Morgan with Charlotte Hawkins		Susanna Reid and Piers Morgan with Ranvir Singh	Susanna Reid and Ben Shephard with Kate Garraway	Ben Shephard and Kate Garraway with Charlotte Hawkins
March 2020 (Note: Reid was isolating from 17 March after someone in her household showed symptoms of COVID-19 and didn't present for the rest of March.)	Piers Morgan, Charlotte Hawkins and Lorraine Kelly		Piers Morgan, Ranvir Singh and Lorraine Kelly	Ben Shephard, Kate Garraway and Lorraine Kelly	
April–June 2020	Susanna Reid, Piers Morgan and Lorraine Kelly				Charlotte Hawkins or Ranvir Singh, Ben Shephard and Lorraine Kelly
June–July 2020	Susanna Reid, Piers Morgan and Lorraine Kelly			Susanna Reid, Ben Shephard and Lorraine Kelly	Charlotte Hawkins or Ranvir Singh, Ben Shephard and Lorraine Kelly
September 2020 – March 2021	Susanna Reid and Piers Morgan with Charlotte Hawkins		Susanna Reid and Piers Morgan with Ranvir Singh	Susanna Reid and Ben Shephard with Kate Garraway (Note: Garraway presented alongside Shephard on alternate Thursdays with Singh filling the newsreader slot when Garraway was presenting.)	Ben Shephard and Kate Garraway with Charlotte Hawkins
March–December 2021 (Note: After Morgan departed the show on 9 March 2021, a series of guest and stand-in presenters filled the seat alongside Reid. These included Ranvir Singh, Ben Shephard, Adil Ray, Alastair Campbell, Bill Turnbull, Richard Madeley, Martin Lewis, Robert Rinder, Ed Balls and Richard Bacon.) (Note: Shephard was absent from the show due to injury in July 2021 and was replaced by Adil Ray (1–2 July), Alastair Campbell (8–9 July), Richard Madeley (15 July) and Charlotte Hawkins (16 July).)	Susanna Reid and Guest/Stand-in Presenters with Charlotte Hawkins		Susanna Reid and Guest/Stand-in Presenters with Ranvir Singh	Susanna Reid and Ben Shephard with Kate Garraway	Ben Shephard and Kate Garraway with Charlotte Hawkins
January 2022 – February 2024 (Note: Richard Madeley and Ed Balls alternated fortnightly to present alongside Reid Monday–Wednesday.)	Susanna Reid and Rotating Presenters with Ranvir Singh		Susanna Reid and Rotating Presenters with Charlotte Hawkins	Susanna Reid and Ben Shephard with Kate Garraway	Ben Shephard and Kate Garraway with Charlotte Hawkins
March 2024 – December 2025 (Note: Ben Shephard departed from Good Morning Britain in February 2024. He was replaced by a series of rotating presenters.)	Susanna Reid and Rotating Presenters with Ranvir Singh		Susanna Reid and Rotating Presenters with Charlotte Hawkins	Susanna Reid and Rotating Presenters with Kate Garraway (Note: Garraway presented alongside Madeley or Balls on alternate Thursdays with Singh filling the newsreader slot when Garraway was presenting.)	Kate Garraway and Rotating Presenters with Charlotte Hawkins
January 2026– (Note: Garraway fills in for Reid on alternate Thursdays presenting alongside Madeley with Singh in turn filling the newsreader slot for Garraway on alternate Tuesdays.)	Susanna Reid and Ed Balls with Kate Garraway		Susanna Reid and Ed Balls with Ranvir Singh	Susanna Reid and Richard Madeley with Ranvir Singh	Kate Garraway and Ranvir Singh
