= List of ITV Weather on air staff =

This is a list of current and former on air staff (i.e. meteorologists and or weather presenters) for the ITV plc produced ITV Weather broadcasts which are transmitted on ITV.

== Current staff ==
- Alex Beresford
  - The West Tonight (2005 – 2009)
  - ITV National Weather (2007 – present)
  - ITV News West Country (2009 – 2022)
  - Daybreak (2012 – 2014)
  - Good Morning Britain (2014 – present)
- Jo Blythe
  - Granada Reports (2001 – present)
  - ITV National Weather (2006 – 2008, 2018, 2021 – present)
- Lily Carter
  - ITV News Channel TV (2024 – present)
  - ITV News Meridian (2026 – present)
  - ITV National Weather (2026 – present)
- Des Coleman
  - ITV News Central (2016 – present)
  - Good Morning Britain (2020 – present)
- Aisling Creevey
  - ITV News Anglia / UTV Live (2017 – present)
- Ruth Dodsworth
  - Wales at Six (2000 – present)
  - Good Morning Britain (2022 – present)
  - ITV National Weather (2023 – present)
- Philippa Drew
  - ITV News Meridian (2005 – present)
- Kerrie Gosney
  - Calendar (2002 – present)
- Holly Green
  - ITV News Meridian (2017 – present)
- Amanda Houston
  - ITV News Anglia (2008 – 2017)
  - ITV National Weather (2014 – present)
- Ross Hutchinson
  - ITV News Anglia (2010 – 2012)
  - ITV News Tyne Tees / Lookaround (2012 – present)
- Emma Jesson
  - (1992 – present)
- Tori Lacey
  - (2023 – present)
- Manali Lukha
  - ITV National Weather (2006 – present)
  - Head of ITV Weather (2014 – present)
- Becky Mantin
  - ITV News Anglia (2002 – 2005)
  - ITV National Weather (2004 – present)
- Nick Miller
  - (2024 – present)
- Chris Page
  - ITV News Anglia (2017 – present)
- Helen Plint
  - (2012 – present)
- Charlie Powell
  - ITV News West Country (2018 – present)
  - ITV National Weather (2026 – present)
- Louise Small
  - UTV Live (2021 – present)
- Laura Tobin
  - Daybreak (2012 – 2014)
  - Good Morning Britain (2012 – present)
- Lucy Verasamy
  - Daybreak (2010 – 2012)
  - ITV National Weather (2012 – present)
- Sally Williams
  - ITV News London (2019 – present)
- James Wright
  - (2002 – present)
- Georgie Palmer
  - (2026 – present)

== Former staff ==
- Genelle Aldred
  - ITV News Central (2014 – 2015)
- Louise Beale
  - ITV News Anglia
- Sophia Bird
  - ITV News Channel TV (2005 – 2022)
- Helen Carnell
  - ITV News Tyne Tees and Lookaround (2011)
- Luke Castiglione
  - ITV News Meridian (2012 – 2017)
- Anna Church
  - ITV News Central
- Bob Crampton
  - ITV News West Country (2008 – 2018)
- Gillian Davies
  - ITV News West Country (2006 – 2013)
- Martyn Davies
  - ITV National Weather (1989 – 2012)
  - ITV News Meridian (2004 – 2012)
- Dan Downs
  - ITV News West Country (1996 – 2012)
- Richard Edgar
  - ITV National Weather (1992 – 1993)
- Carl Edwards
  - Wales at Six (2013 – 2014)
- Sarah Farmer
  - ITV News Meridian (2009)
- Fiona Farrell
  - ITV National Weather (1995 – 1997)
- Nazaneen Ghaffar
  - The West Tonight
- Karin Giannone
  - ITV News Anglia (1999)
- Simon Gilbert
  - Calendar (2003)
- Laura Greene
  - ITV National Weather (1995 – 1998)
- Peter Griffin
  - ITV News West Country (1993 – 2013)
- Steve Hadley
  - Calendar (2004 – 2005)
- John Hammond
  - ITV National Weather (1997 – 2003)
- Kate Haskell
  - Westcountry Live (1998 – 2009)
  - ITV News West Country (2009 – 2025)
- Alex Hill
  - ITV National Weather (1989 – 1995)
- Lucy Holleron
  - ITV News Central (2009 – 2016)
- David Hughes
  - ITV News Anglia
- Gemma Humphries
  - ITV News Meridian (2000 – 2009)
- Wendy Hurrell
  - ITV News Anglia (2004 – 2008)
- Becky Jago
  - ITV News Anglia (1999 – 2001)
- Bob Johnson
  - ITV News Tyne Tees (1991 – 2008)
- Shireen Jordan
  - ITV News Channel TV (2022 – 2023)
- Lara Lewington
  - ITV News London (2010)
- Kate Lewis
  - Wales at Six (2014 – 2018)
- Debbie Lindley
  - Calendar (1996 – 2009)
- Siân Lloyd
  - ITV National Weather (1990 – 2014)
- Rachel Mackley
  - ITV News Anglia (2008 – 2010)
- Beki Mahon
  - ITV News Central (2008)
- Kirsty McCabe
  - Daybreak (2010 – 2012)
- Robin McCallum
  - ITV National Weather (2002 – 2005)
  - ITV News London (2005 – 2012)
- Adian McGivern
  - ITV News Anglia (2013 – 2016)
- Claire McGlasson
  - ITV News Anglia
- Frank Mitchell
  - UTV Live (1993 – 2021)
- Jon Mitchell
  - Calendar (1989 – 2022)
  - ITV National Weather (2006 – 2008)
- Clare Nasir
  - ITV News Anglia (1997 – 2000)
  - ITV News London (2010 – 2013)
- Charlie Neil
  - ITV News Central (1992 – 2009)
- Simon Parkin
  - ITV News Meridian (2006 – 2017)
- Angie Phillips
  - ITV National Weather (1993 – 1995)
- Alice Piper
  - ITV News Anglia (2010 – 2017)
- Amanda Piper
  - ITV News Meridian
- Kesley Redmore
  - Wales at Six (2017 – 2022)
- Chrissie Reidy
  - ITV National Weather (2001 – 2005)
  - ITV News London (2005 – 2009)
- Martin Stew
  - ITV News London (2012 – 2019)
- Fred Talbot
  - Granada Reports (2009 – 2012)
- Sara Thornton
  - ITV News Anglia (2002 – 2008)
- Pip Tomson
  - ITV News Tyne Tees / Lookaround (2009 – 2012)
- Alex Watson
  - ITV News Tyne Tees / Lookaround (2009 – 2010, 2012)
- Trish Williamson
  - ITV National Weather (1989 – 1990)

== Notes ==
- Most regional weather presenters sometimes provide the weather for more than one region.

== See also ==
- List of ITV News on air staff
