= List of ITV News on air staff =

This is a list of current and former on air staff for the ITN produced ITV News broadcasts which are transmitted on ITV and ITVX.

== Newscasters ==
=== Lead newscasters ===
- Tom Bradby
  - ITV News at Ten (2015–)
- Julie Etchingham
  - ITV News at Ten (2008–)
- Nina Hossain
  - ITV Lunchtime News (2004–)
  - ITV News at Ten (2009–)
- Mary Nightingale
  - ITV Evening News (2001–)

=== Other newscasters ===
- Sameena Ali-Khan
  - ITV Weekend News (2006, 2021–)
- Rebecca Barry
  - ITV Weekend News (2022–)
- Yasmin Bodalbhai
  - ITV Lunchtime News (2023-)
  - ITV Weekend News (2023–)
- Paul Brand
  - ITV News at Ten (2023-)
  - ITV Weekend News (2022–)
- Andrea Byrne
  - ITV Weekend News (2010–)
- Gamal Fahnbulleh
  - ITV Weekend News (2021–)
  - ITV Lunchtime News (2022-)
  - ITV Evening News (2022-)
  - ITV News at Ten (2022-)
- Duncan Golestani
  - ITV Weekend News (2019–)
  - ITV Lunchtime News (2021-)
- Jonathan Hill
  - ITV Weekend News (2022–)
- James Mates
  - ITV Weekend News (2002–)
- Lucrezia Millarini
  - ITV Evening News (2019–)
  - ITV Lunchtime News (2017–)
  - ITV News at Ten (2021–)
  - ITV Weekend News (2015–)
- Chris Ship
  - ITV Evening News (2021–)
  - ITV Lunchtime News (2019–)
  - ITV Weekend News (2009–)
  - ITV News at Ten (2022–)
- Geraint Vincent
  - ITV Lunchtime News (2006–2012, 2021–)
  - ITV Weekend News (2006–2012, 2021–)
  - ITV Evening News (2006–2012, 2018–)
  - ITV News at Ten (2012, 2024–)
- Lucy Watson
  - ITV Lunchtime News (2022–)
  - ITV Weekend News (2021–)
- Romilly Weeks
  - ITV Evening News (2006–2014, 2021–)
  - ITV Lunchtime News (2006–)
  - ITV Weekend News (2006–)
  - ITV News at Ten (2023–)
- Charlene White
  - ITV Evening News (2014–)
  - ITV Lunchtime News (2014–)
  - ITV News at Ten (2014–2015, 2020–)
- Charlotte Hawkins (2025–)
  - ITV Evening News (2025–)
  - ITV Weekend News (2025–)
  - ITV Lunchtime News (2026–)
  - ITV News at Ten (2026–)

=== Former newscasters ===
- Fiona Armstrong (1985–1993)
- Pamela Armstrong (1984–1986)
- Mark Austin (1998–2016)
- Matt Barbet (2013–2014)
- Faye Barker (2005–2012)
- Carol Barnes (1980–1999, 2003–2004)
- Felicity Barr (2002–2006)
- Reginald Bosanquet (1967–1979)
- Timothy Brinton (1959–1962)
- Sir Alastair Burnet (1963–1991)
- Sue Carpenter (1986–1992)
- Andrea Catherwood (2003–2006)
- Christopher Chataway (1955–1956)
- Steve Clamp (2009–2010, 2012)
- Sir Robin Day (1955–1959)
- Katie Derham (1998–2010)
- Ali Douglas (2010–2012)
- Mimi Fawaz
- Anna Ford (1977–1981)
- Sandy Gall (1963–1992)
- Andrew Gardner (1962–1977)
- Shiulie Ghosh (1998–2006)
- Jon Gilbert (2009–2012)
- Andrew Harvey (2000–2001)
- Gordon Honeycombe (1965–1977)
- Alex Hyndman (2009–2013)
- Gwyn Jones (1995-1997)
- Jackie Kabler (2008–2012)
- Natasha Kaplinsky (2011–2016)
- Robert Kee (1972–1976)
- Ludovic Kennedy (1956–1958)
- Martyn Lewis (1979–1986)
- Barbara Mandell (1955–1960)
- Daisy McAndrew (2006–2007, 2010–2011)
- Sir Trevor McDonald (1977–2005, 2008)
- Rachel McTavish (1997–2007, 2011–2012)
- Lucy Meacock (2007–2009, 2011–2015)
- Graham Miller (1993–1999)
- Ivor Mills (1965–1978)
- Saima Mohsin
- Dermot Murnaghan (1989–2002)
- Bill Neely (2004–2008)
- John Nicolson
- Michael Nicholson (1976–1986)
- Joyce Ohajah (2003–2005)
- Rageh Omaar (2015–2024)
- Nicholas Owen (1984–2006)
- Leonard Parkin (1967–1987)
- Kylie Pentelow (2014–2023)
- Sonia Ruseler (1992–1993)
- Selina Scott (1980–1983)
- Steve Scott (2005–2015)
- Ranvir Singh (2014–2020)
- Salma Siraj
- Peter Sissons (1967–1982)
- Richard Slee (1998-2002)
- Jon Snow (1987–1989)
- Julia Somerville (1987–2001)
- Alastair Stewart (1980–1992, 2003–2020)
- John Suchet (1980–2004)
- Matt Teale (2009–2014)
- Owen Thomas (2001–2005)
- Pip Tomson (2005)
- Denis Tuohy (1994–2000)
- Mark Webster (1982–2005)
- Tim Willcox (1998–2001)
- Sascha Williams (2009–2014)
- Kirsty Young (2000–2001)

== Correspondents/Editors ==
=== International ===
- Debi Edward: Asia Correspondent
- John Irvine: Senior International Correspondent
- Rageh Omaar: International Affairs Analyst
- James Mates: Europe Editor
- Robert Moore
- Emma Murphy: International Affairs Editor
- Dan Rivers: U.S. Correspondent

=== National ===
- Paul Brand: UK Editor
- Ben Chapman: Midlands Correspondent
- Stacey Foster: Midlands Correspondent
- Sangita Lal: West of England Reporter
- Louise Scott: Scotland Reporter
- Rachel Townsend: North of England Correspondent
- Amy Welch: North of England Reporter
- Jonathan Brown: North of England Reporter
- Rhys Williams: Wales Reporter
- Stewart Robson: Northern Ireland Reporter

=== Political ===
- Jasmine Cameron-Chileshe: Political Reporter
- Carl Dinnen: Political Correspondent
- Harry Horton: Political Correspondent
- Robert Peston: Political Editor
- Romilly Weeks: Political Correspondent
- Louisa James: Political Correspondent
- Chloe Keedy: Political Correspondent

=== Specialist ===
- Rebecca Barry: Health Correspondent
- Chris Choi: Consumer Editor
- Sarah Corker: Social Affairs Correspondent
- Rishi Davda: Entertainment Reporter
- Daniel Hewitt: Investigations Editor
- Joel Hills: Business/Economics Editor
- Rohit Kachroo: Global Security Editor
- Nina Nannar: Arts Editor
- Chris Ship: Royal Editor
- Martin Stew: Health/Science Correspondent

=== Sports ===
- Steve Scott: Sports Editor
- Chris Skudder: Sports Reporter

=== General News ===
- Faye Barker
- Neil Connery
- Cari Davies
- Amy Lewis:
- Charlie Frost
- Olivia Guthrie
- Sam Holder
- Sejal Karia
- Ellie Pitt
- John Ray
- Geraint Vincent
- Lucy Watson
- Rachel Younger
- Aisha Zahid
- Rosie Dowsing
- Sabah Choudhry
- Mahatir Pasha

== Notes ==
- Reporters from regional ITV News services (as well as from STV) and Good Morning Britain appear on national news bulletins (in particular, the ITV Lunchtime News) in the absence of any ITN correspondent or reporter.
- National Correspondents occasionally report from out-with their main coverage area.
- In addition, CNN correspondents are occasionally featured on the aforementioned programme to provide analysis and details of any breaking international stories.

== See also ==
- List of ITV Weather on air staff
