= List of Lorraine on air staff =

This article shows the on air team members for the ITV Breakfast programme Lorraine which began broadcasting in the United Kingdom on 6 September 2010.

The lead presenter is Lorraine Kelly, with Christine Lampard or Ranvir Singh filling in when Kelly is absent. Lampard is the show’s longest serving presenter, aside from Kelly herself.

From 2010 to 2012, the show was presented by Kelly from Monday–Thursday with a rotation of guest hosts presenting on Fridays. From 2012 to 2014, regular stand-in host Kate Garraway presented the Friday shows.

From 2014 to 2023, Kelly presented the Friday shows. As of 2024, the show is presented by Kelly from Monday–Thursday with Lampard and Singh alternating to present the Friday shows.

Following the changes to ITV Daytime commencing in January 2026, Kelly presents Monday-Friday with both Lampard and Singh leaving their alternate presenting duties on the show.

== Current on air team ==
Tenure	Person	Role
Presenters
2010–	Lorraine Kelly	Monday–Thursday (2010–2014, 2024-2025); Monday–Friday (2014–2024, 2026–)
Experts
2010–	Martin Lewis	Financial expert
2010–	Mark Heyes	Stylist
2010–	Ross King	Los Angeles correspondent
2010–	Hilary Jones	Health editor
2010–	Ria Hebden	Entertainment presenter
2010–	Kevin Maguire	News reviewer
2010–	Andrew Pierce	News reviewer
2010–	Martel Maxwell	News reviewer
2010–	Katie Nicholl	News reviewer
2022–	Tyler West	News reviewer

== Former on air team ==
Tenure	Person	Role
Presenters
2010–2014	Kate Garraway	Holiday cover (2010–2014); Friday (2012–2014)
2020–2025	Ranvir Singh	Holiday cover (2020–2025); Friday (alternate; 2024–2025)
2017–2025	Christine Lampard	Holiday cover (2017–2025); Friday (alternate; 2024–2025)
Segment presenters and experts
2010–2011	Ed Baines	Chef
2014–2017	Sally Bee	Chef
2010–2017	Dean Edwards	Chef
2010, 2017	Ainsley Harriott	Chef
2012–2015	Bill Granger	Chef
2016–2017	Ching He Huang	Chef
2013–2015	Nadia Sawalha	Chef
2010–2017	James Tanner	Chef
2011	Matt Tebbutt	Chef
2014–2017	John Whaite	Chef
2010–2014	Victoria Derbyshire	News reviewer
2010–2014	Mark Durden-Smith	News reviewer
2010–2012	Julia Hartley-Brewer	News reviewer
2010–2012	Kevin O'Sullivan	News reviewer
2010–2014	Aasmah Mir	News reviewer
2010–2013	Adil Ray	News reviewer
2010–2015	Celia Walden	News reviewer
2010	Andrew Clover	News reviewer
2011–2014	Samira Ahmed	News reviewer
2011	Yasmin Alibhai-Brown	News reviewer
2011	Oona King	News reviewer
2011–2012	Andy Jones	News reviewer
2011–2012	Natasha Courtenay-Smith	News reviewer
2011–2015	Michael Portillo	News reviewer
2011–2014	Olly Mann	News reviewer
2012–2014	Jayne Secker	News reviewer
2012–2015	Eleanor Mills	News reviewer
2010–2011	Craig Doyle	Lorraine Investigates reporter

== Guest presenters ==
Year	Presenter	Episodes
2010, 2011	Michael Ball	6 episodes
2026	Josie Gibson	1 episode
2026	Christine Lampard	6 episodes
2023, 2024	Louise Minchin	5 episodes
2010	Lynda Bellingham	1 episode
2010–2012	Jackie Brambles	16 episodes
2010–2011	Emma Bunton	3 episodes
2017	Fearne Cotton	3 episodes
2021	Cat Deeley	10 episodes
2024	Joel Dommett	2 episodes
2015	Jenni Falconer	5 episodes
2011	Gaynor Faye	2 episodes
2011–2014	Helen Fospero	32 episodes
2010, 2011	Kirsty Gallacher	2 episodes
2018, 2025	Kate Garraway	4 episodes
2012, 2016	Amanda Holden	7 episodes
2017–2018	Rochelle Humes	8 episodes
2011	Ross King	1 episode
2010, 2012	Myleene Klass	2 episodes
2010	Sharon Osbourne	2 episodes
2020–2021, 2024–2025	Andi Peters	17 episodes
2010–2011, 2015–2016	Fiona Phillips	70 episodes
2015–2016	Gaby Roslin	48 episodes
2011–2012, 2014	Nadia Sawalha	56 episodes
2016, 2017	Helen Skelton	7 episodes
2016	Lisa Snowdon	4 episodes
2012	Kate Thornton	6 episodes
2010, 2012	Denise van Outen	2 episodes
2011, 2018, 2019, 2022	Carol Vorderman	26 episodes
2010	Denise Welch	1 episode
2026	Ruth Langsford	1 episode
2026	Ben Shephard	1 episode
