= Lucy Verasamy =

British weather forecaster

- Born: 2 August 1980 (age 46); King's Lynn, Norfolk, England
- Education: Brunel University
- Occupation: TV presenter
- Years active: 2005-2026
- Known for: ITV Weather; ITV Racing; Good Morning Britain
- Website: Lucy Verasamy on X

Lucy Verasamy (born 2 August 1980) is a British weather forecaster formerly for ITV Weather, ITV Racing and ITV's Good Morning Britain.

== Early life and education ==
Verasamy was born in King's Lynn, Norfolk, and attended Silfield Primary School in Wymondham, Framlingham College Junior School in Suffolk and King Edward VII School in King's Lynn, where she studied A-level geography. She graduated with a BSc (Hons) degree in geography from Brunel University in 2001.

== Career ==
After graduation, Verasamy trained and worked as a meteorologist at the Press Association’s weather centre (Later renamed Meteogroup – Europe’s Largest private weather company) – writing national and international weather forecasts for TV, radio, and Newspapers.

Having previously completed a work experience placement at the Sky Weather Centre before becoming a weather forecaster, Verasamy joined Sky and became the regular weather presenter on the Sky News breakfast show Sunrise. In 2007, the Sky News website started a feature entitled Climate Clinic – Ask Lucy as part of their Green Britain campaign, where Verasamy answered questions put forward by members of the public regarding climate change. She also contributed to Sky News The Weather Girls blog.

On 6 September 2010, she joined the newly-launched ITV Breakfast programme Daybreak, as a weather forecaster and environment correspondent, alongside Kirsty McCabe. On 7 February 2012, McCabe left the programme, leaving Verasamy as the sole weather forecaster. On 2 August 2012, she too left the programme.

Since 2012, Verasamy has fronted the national weather forecasts for ITV.

In addition, as of 2017, Verasamy is part of the ITV Racing team as a weather expert. She also joined Good Morning Britain as a relief weather presenter from August. In 2019 she fronted the M & S Fresh Food Market promotions.

In March 2020, Verasamy was to co-present the then upcoming ITV travel show How to Spend It Well on Holiday with Phillip Schofield. The show was pulled from airing due to the COVID-19 pandemic in the United Kingdom, and with the expectation of being shown at a later date.

In November 2020, Verasamy began presenting on ITV's digital series Climate Crisis: Our Changing World, alongside fellow ITV weather presenters Laura Tobin and Alex Beresford.

In 2021, Verasamy fronted Marks & Spencer's "Fresh Market Update" advertising campaign, featuring cooked produce from Marks & Spencer's own growers and producers.

== Filmography ==
Year	Title	Role	Notes
2005–2010	Sky News	Weather presenter	
2010–2012	Daybreak	Weather presenter	
2012–2026	ITV Weather	Weather presenter	
2017–2026	ITV Racing	Weather presenter	
2017–2026	Good Morning Britain	Weather presenter	
2020–present	Climate Crisis: Our Changing World	Presenter	
2021–present	How to Spend It Well on Holiday	Co-presenter	
