= Drive (2016 TV series) =

2016 British game show

- Genre: Reality Game show
- Presented by: Vernon Kay; Jason Plato
- Voices of: James Allen
- Country of origin: United Kingdom
- Original language: English
- No. of series: 1
- No. of episodes: 5

Production
- Running time: 60 minutes (inc. adverts)
- Production company: Twofour

Original release
- Network: ITV
- Release: 5 April – 3 May 2016

Drive is a British reality game show that aired on ITV from 5 April to 3 May 2016. It is hosted by Vernon Kay with Jason Plato as the pundit and James Allen as the commentator.

== Celebrities ==
Celebrity	Known for	Position
Louis Walsh	TV personality	Eighth
Mariella Frostrup	Journalist and TV presenter	Seventh; Withdrew on 19 April 2016
Ella Eyre	Singer	Sixth
Colin Jackson	Olympian	Fifth
Johnny Vegas	Actor and comedian	Fourth
Laura Tobin	GMB weather presenter	Third
Angus Deayton	Actor	Second
Professor Green	Rapper and TV presenter	First

== Episodes ==
Episode	Date	Discipline	Celebrities In Night Race	Celebrity Eliminated
1	5 April 2016	Banger Racing	Louis Walsh and Colin Jackson	Louis Walsh
2	12 April 2016	Buggy Racing	Angus Deayton and Johnny Vegas	Angus Deayton†
3	19 April 2016	4X4 Racing	Ella Eyre and Laura Tobin	Laura Tobin
4	26 April 2016	Rallycross	Ella Eyre and Angus Deayton	Ella Eyre
5	3 May 2016	Banger Wildcard Race	None	Louis Walsh; Mariella Frostrup; Ella Eyre; Laura Tobin (Winner)
5	3 May 2016	Formula 4	None	Colin Jackson; Johnny Vegas; Laura Tobin; Angus Deayton; Professor Green (Winner)

† Deayton was eliminated second, but returned following the withdrawal of Mariella Frostup.
