= Lucy Watson =

Lucy Watson may refer to:

- Lucy Seton-Watson, British daughter of historian and political scientist Hugh Seton-Watson
- Lucy Watson (journalist), English journalist and newsreader
- Lucy Watson (footballer) (born 2003), English professional footballer
- Lucy Watson, British cast member in the UK structured-reality TV series Made in Chelsea
- Lucy Watson (1722–1785), English wife of philanthropist John Thornton
