= Nick Dixon =

Scottish journalist, presenter and producer

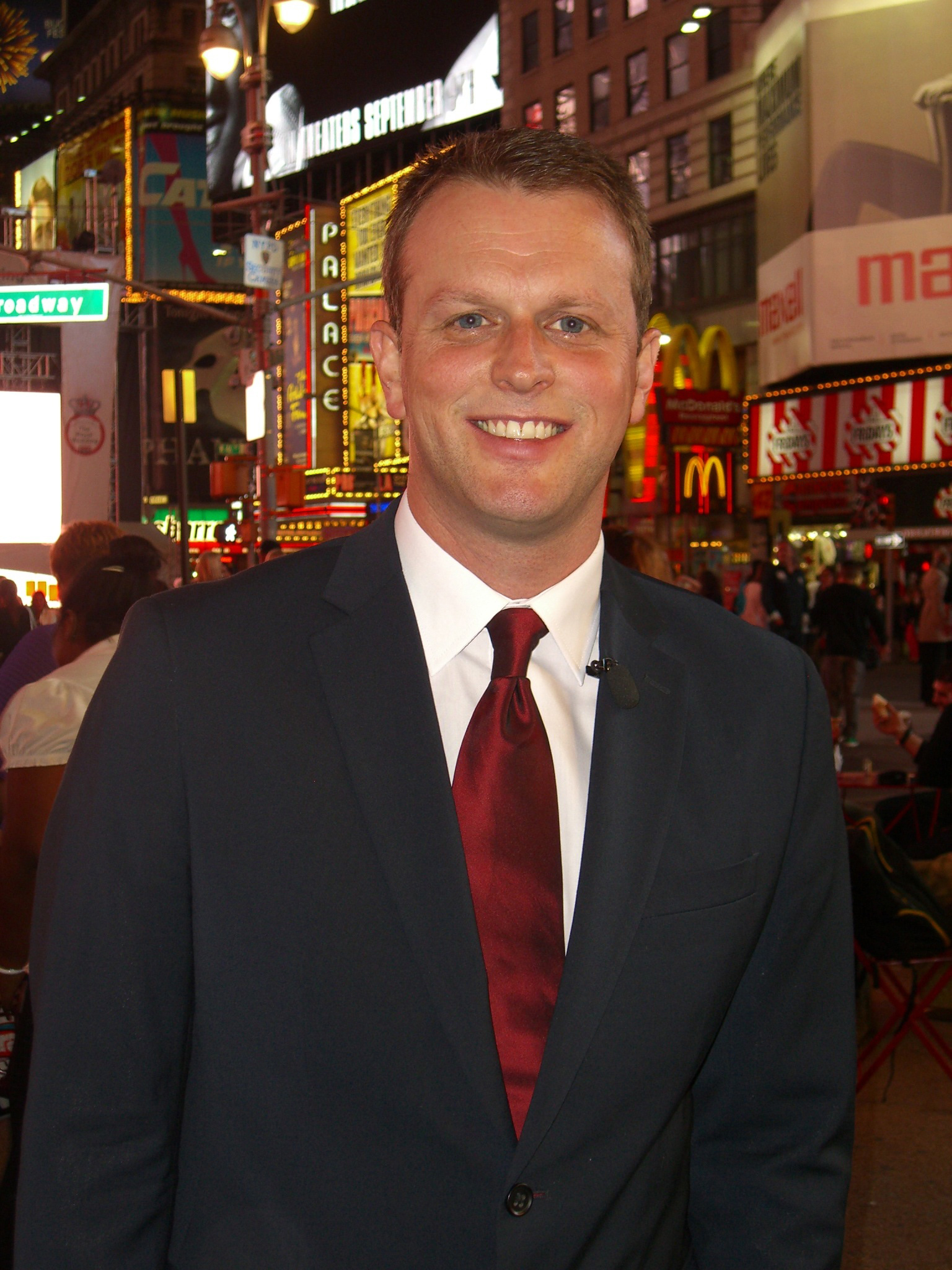
- Dixon reporting on Daybreak from Times Square on 28 April 2011
- Born: Nick Dixon; 26 September 1971 (age 54); Scotland, United Kingdom
- Occupations: Correspondent, Journalist, Television producer
- Years active: 2005-present
- Television: Good Morning Britain (2014—); Daybreak (2010-14); GMTV (2005-10)
- Children: 1 (b. 2012)

Nick Dixon is a Scottish journalist, television presenter and former television producer, best known for his roles on ITV Breakfast programmes GMTV, Daybreak and Good Morning Britain. In 2005, Dixon joined breakfast programme GMTV as a news correspondent and a stand-in news presenter on the programme. When GMTV closed in 2010, he was transferred to the show's successor Daybreak where he worked as their New York City correspondent. He is now based in London working as a News Correspondent for the current ITV Breakfast show Good Morning Britain. He has two children.

== Career ==
Nick Dixon left school at the age of 16 and went to work for BBC Scotland delivering the mail.

In 1991, Dixon started as a copy boy in the newsroom of BBC Radio Scotland, moving onto typing up stories from reporters and correspondents and helping out on location.

Dixon joined Radio Clyde in Glasgow as a Production Assistant in 1993 and in the same year worked as a researcher on the BBC quiz show Catchword.

Dixon started with Scottish Television (STV) as a Promotions Director in 1995.

1999 marked the beginning of Dixon's time with Scottish Television's flagship news programme Scotland Today, starting as a production journalist. Dixon reported on news items such as the Maryhill gas explosion, the Tsunami appeal, the opening of the Scottish Parliament and the Edinburgh Festival.

Dixon has also produced and presented a documentary on STV entitled Archie McLean: The Forgotten Father of Brazilian Football.

Moving to London in July 2005, Dixon joined GMTV as a news producer. He was promoted to reporter in November 2005 and during his first week on the job reported live from the Paris riots on the Champs-Élysées. Dixon reported live from Times Square, New York City on David Blaine's world record attempt in May 2006. He was also a relief newsreader on GMTV.

In September 2010, Dixon transferred to ITV Breakfast programme Daybreak as New York correspondent. From July 2011 until April 2014, he was a Features correspondent, based in London. In April 2014, Daybreak was axed to make way for a new ITV Breakfast programme called Good Morning Britain for which Dixon is a news correspondent.

== Filmography ==
Year	Title	Role	Notes	Reference(s)
1999-2005	Scotland Today	News presenter	Stand-in news presenter on 28 April 2006 and 20 February 2007	
2005-2010	GMTV	News Correspondent	Stand-in news presenter on 28 April 2006 and 20 February 2007	
2006	Archie McLean: The Forgotten Father of Brazilian Football	Narrator and Producer	One-off documentary for STV	
2010-11	Daybreak	New York Correspondent	Replaced by Lucy Watson in July 2011	
2011-14	Daybreak	News Correspondent	Based in London since 2011	
2014—	Good Morning Britain	News Correspondent	Moved from Daybreak in April 2014	
