= ITV Lunchtime News =

British TV news programme (since 1972)

- ITV News opening sequence
- Presented by: Nina Hossain
- Voices of: Gayanne Potter (intro)
- Theme music composer: Dave Hewson
- Opening theme: "Global Broadcast"
- Country of origin: United Kingdom
- Original language: English

Production
- Production locations: ITN headquarters, London, England, UK
- Editors: Rachel Corp (Editor, ITV News)
- Camera setup: Multi-camera
- Running time: 25 minutes
- Production company: ITN

Original release
- Network: ITV
- Release: 16 October 1972 – present

Related
- News at One; ITV Evening News; ITV News at Ten; ITV Weekend News

The ITV Lunchtime News is the afternoon news programme produced by ITN on the British television network ITV. It airs Monday to Friday from 12:30pm or 1:30pm, covering British national and international news stories and is presented by various ITV News presenters, most commonly Nina Hossain.

== History ==
Television broadcasting hours in the United Kingdom had been tightly regulated and controlled by the British government until 1972, when the then Conservative government under Prime Minister Edward Heath decided to end all limits and restrictions on the broadcasting hours of television.

ITV had been campaigning for the end of the restrictions since the mid-1960s, and finally on 19 January 1972, the government announced the lifting of all restrictions, allowing proper daytime television to launch on both the BBC and ITV.

ITN had provided a short lunchtime news summary to start the ITV schedules on a Saturday since 1959, with an afternoon news summary on a Sunday starting in the mid-1960s, however it was the lifting of the restrictions on 16 October 1972 which helped ITN to launch a codified, more solid weekday lunchtime news programme as part of a raft of new programming which would now take up broadcasting hours which were up to 1972 restricted to schools programming and adult education.

The programme was first broadcast on 16 October 1972 as First Report, a twenty-minute bulletin presented by Robert Kee at 12:40pm. The bulletin was moved to 1:00pm on 30 September 1974 and retitled as News at One on 13 September 1976. Leonard Parkin and Peter Sissons alternated as the programme's lead presenters in the same year after Kee's departure.

On 20 July 1987, the bulletin was relaunched as News at 12:30. Jon Snow and former BBC newsreader Julia Somerville fronted alternate editions of the programme. On 7 March 1988, ITV's daytime programming was rejigged and the bulletin was moved back to its 1:00pm timeslot. News at One later relaunched on 16 October 1989 with John Suchet as its lead presenter. On 7 January 1991, the programme moved this time to 12:30pm.

On 2 March 1992, News at 12:30 was relaunched as the Lunchtime News with a dual-presenting team, comprising Nicholas Owen, Sonia Ruseler (who left in 1993) and Carol Barnes, with Dermot Murnaghan joining later in 1992 and Julia Somerville in early 1993. On 13 March 1995, ITN's news bulletins were relaunched with a cohesive identity.

On 8 March 1999, coinciding with a relaunch of all bulletins which included the controversial axing of News at Ten, John Suchet returned to the newly named ITV Lunchtime News to replace Murnaghan, now lead presenter of the new ITV Nightly News, to co-present with Somerville. Somerville left ITN in 2001, and Suchet became sole anchor. Nicholas Owen would later return as lead presenter of the bulletin in 2003.

On 2 February 2004, ITV News was relaunched and the 12:30pm bulletin was restructured: Owen was joined by Katie Derham in a return to a dual-presenting team; then, on 11 April 2005, to coincide with the launch of the new ITV Day strand, the programme was extended to 60 minutes. The 15-minute regional news bulletin at 3:00pm was axed and incorporated into the new 60-minute ITV Lunchtime News. On 4 September 2006, the 60-minute format was axed, returning to its shorter length and at a new broadcast time of 1:30pm. On 5 February 2007, Owen left to join BBC News and was replaced by Alastair Stewart.

In April 2007 ITN announced that ITV had awarded it a 6-year contract to produce ITV News, at a cost of £250 million.

ITV Lunchtime News switched from the traditional 4:3 format to 16:9 widescreen since 3 December 2007.

On 27 July 2009, the ITV Lunchtime News returned to a single presenter, with Stewart and Katie Derham alternating. Derham later left ITV News in June 2010 and was replaced by Nina Hossain.

On 2 November 2009, the bulletin was retitled as ITV News at 1:30 (though never announced on screen, where it was simply referred to as the ITV News, in contrast to other bulletins) as part of a rebrand of the channel's news programmes. Since 12 October 2015, the programme was again being referred to as the ITV Lunchtime News.

On 24 May 2019 it was announced Hossain would become the sole presenter of the programme.

The ITV Lunchtime News presenter also fronts the impending ITV News London lunchtime bulletin from 13:55.

== On air staff ==
=== Main newscaster ===
- Nina Hossain (2004–present)

=== Other newscasters ===
- Yasmin Bodalbahi (2023–present)
- Gamal Fahnbulleh (2022–present)
- Charlotte Hawkins (2026–present)
- Lucrezia Millarini (2017–present)
- Geraint Vincent (2006–2012, 2021–present)
- Lucy Watson (2022–present)
- Romilly Weeks (2006–present)
- Charlene White (2014–present)

=== Former newscasters ===
- Mark Austin (1998–2002, 2009–2010)
- Carol Barnes (1980–2001)
- Felicity Barr (2001–2005)
- Sally Biddulph (2009)
- Andrea Byrne (2010–2012)
- Andrea Catherwood (2003–2006)
- Katie Derham (1998–2010)
- Shiulie Ghosh (2000–2004)
- Andrew Harvey (2001–2004)
- Alex Hyndman (2009)
- Natasha Kaplinsky (2011–2013)
- Robert Kee (1972–1976)
- Daisy McAndrew (2006–2011)
- Lucy Meacock (2007–2009)
- Dermot Murnaghan (1993–2001)
- Mary Nightingale (2000–2002, 2009–2015)
- Rageh Omaar (2013–2015, 2020–2024)
- Nicholas Owen (1992–2007)
- Leonard Parkin (1976–1987)
- Kylie Pentelow (2021, 2023)
- Sonia Ruseler (1992–1993)
- Steve Scott (2005–2015)
- Ranvir Singh (2014–2020)
- Peter Sissons (1976–1983)
- Jon Snow (1987–1988)
- Julia Somerville (1987–2000)
- Alastair Stewart (1983–1987, 2005–2020)
- John Suchet (1989–2004)
- Kirsty Young (2000–2001)

Preceded by Newsnight, Jeremy Paxman interviews Michael Howard	RTS: Television Journalism; Interview (Dermot Murnaghan Interviews Peter Mandelson); 1999	Succeeded by BBC News, Tim Sebastian
