= Pink Paper =

Weekly UK newspaper serving the LGBT+ community

- Founder(s): Stephen Burton; Stephen Burn
- Publisher: Mindmaster Ltd. Chronos Publishing; Millivres Prowler
- Editor: Alistair Pegg; David Bridle; Tris Reid-Smith
- Founded: 1987
- Ceased publication: September 2012
- Language: English
- City: London
- Country: United Kingdom
- ISSN: 1472-3662
- OCLC number: 30618725

The Pink Paper was a UK publication covering gay and lesbian issues published by Millivres Prowler Limited. Founded in 1987 as a newspaper, it switched to internet-only publication in June 2009. The decision to go online-only was announced in June 2009 and attributed to economic conditions, and at the time management said a printed version might reappear in the future.

A decision to close the website – again citing poor economic conditions – was taken in June 2012, with the site finally being shuttered in September 2012. The brand and assets remain in the ownership of Millivres Prowler.

As a tabloid newspaper, it had a circulation of over 40,000 in Britain (2006). It was distributed free in bars, clubs, libraries, community centres, businesses and other places.

Pink Paper had regional correspondents around the country who filed stories from their area. They also covered national news stories. Comment, lifestyle, culture, celebrity interviews and gossip, travel, property and finance were also included in the Pink Paper.

Past staff members include Phil Reay-Smith, now of ITN; Ben Summerskill, former chief executive of Stonewall; SFX editor Darren Scott; author Peter Lloyd; writer Adam Lowe; and Tim Teeman of The Times.
