= Phil Reay-Smith =

Phil Reay-Smith is a senior Amazon corporate communications leader. Previously he was a director at the London PR and communications agency 3 Monkeys Zeno, part of the global Zeno Communications group, a Daniel J. Edelman company.

He began his career as a journalist, working for EuroNews and ITN as a correspondent and as consumer editor on ITV breakfast show Daybreak.

He moved into communications when he was appointed Head of Media at the London branch of the PR and Marketing agency Ogilvy.

== Broadcasting career ==
Reay-Smith joined ITN as a news correspondent in 2000. Initially working for the broadcaster's 24-hour news channel, he went on to cover such events as the 2001 earthquake in Gujarat and the Boxing Day tsunami in 2004. In 2003, he was embedded with the British army during the Iraq war, becoming the first British journalist to cross into Iraqi territory.

Reay-Smith was regarded as a multi-skilled journalist, often filming and editing his own packages. This style of journalism was evident in his investigative coverage of the 2005 UK General Election in reports known as the Outsider. He often specialised in reporting on adventure stories, such as Sir Ranulph Fiennes' summiting of the north face of the Eiger in 2007. Phil also reported on Sir Ranulph Fiennes' second failed attempt at summiting Mount Everest in May 2008. In August and September 2008, he reported live from the Arctic Circle where adventurer Lewis Gordon Pugh attempted to become the first person to kayak to the North Pole. His reporting documented how cracks in the ice have made it possible to travel through what used to be permafrost.

In August 2010 Reay-Smith left ITN to join the launch team of ITV's new flagship breakfast show Daybreak as consumer editor. He reported on a variety of consumer issues and occasionally joined the main presenting team to discuss the day's newspapers and top stories. However, following the poor ratings performance of the show in its first year on air, a new editorial team was appointed at the end of 2011 and Phil was one of several members of the Daybreak team to be dropped from the show in early 2012.

== Media career ==
In May 2012, Reay-Smith was appointed Head of Media at Ogilvy PR/London – a move he stated as being "a long-term career goal".

Reay-Smith is also a freelance writer. He has written for Attitude, The Times, The Daily Telegraph and the Independent on Sunday. Before working for ITN, Reay-Smith was an assistant editor for the Pink Paper.

== Personal life ==
Reay-Smith married his boyfriend Michael in Toronto, Canada in 2005. He spoke about his marriage on air when reporting on the introduction of civil partnerships to the UK. He is also an advocate for gay adoption and has frequently discussed the couple's adoption of his son.
