= Steve Hargrave =

English journalist (born 1978)

- Born: Dorchester, Dorset, United Kingdom
- Occupations: Broadcast journalist, TV presenter and writer
- Years active: 15
- Notable credit(s): Sunrise – Channel 7 Sky News; ITV Daybreak; London Tonight; ITV News; BBC 6 Music

Steve Hargrave is an English broadcast journalist, presenter, writer and content creator known for his unique celebrity interviews and red-carpet reports.

== Broadcasting career ==
Hargrave began his career presenting and producing news for 2CR Radio in Bournemouth before hosting Entertainment News for Independent Radio News. He then joined ITN produced services London Tonight and ITV News as an Entertainment Correspondent, where he also created and presented ITV2's daily showbiz news bulletin. He was subsequently named one of Broadcast magazine's under-30 UK Media Hotshots.

In 2008, he joined Sky News as its Entertainment Correspondent, regularly reporting live from red carpets at events such as the Oscars the Cannes Film Festival and reporting live on major breaking news stories such as Michael Jackson's death.

On 6 September 2010, he joined ITV's Flagship Breakfast Show Daybreak as an entertainment correspondent. He became known for his irreverent, unique and humorous interviews, such as playing ukulele with Dolly Parton backstage with Usher. and interviewing Britney Spears.

Hargrave went on to join Australian breakfast show Sunrise as their UK Correspondent, where he reported on national news items as well as continuing his celebrity interviews, chatting to the likes of Cher and Ryan Gosling He also returned to Sky News for showbiz updates and newspaper reviews alongside Eamonn Holmes. He currently also reports for 5 News on both news and entertainment stories, including a chat with Tom Cruise.

Hargrave has presented the music news on BBC 6 Music, a weekly gig guide for LBC Radio and hosted numerous podcasts. He has written for US music magazine Paste and has had articles published for Total Film.
