= Dan Lobb =

British sports broadcaster

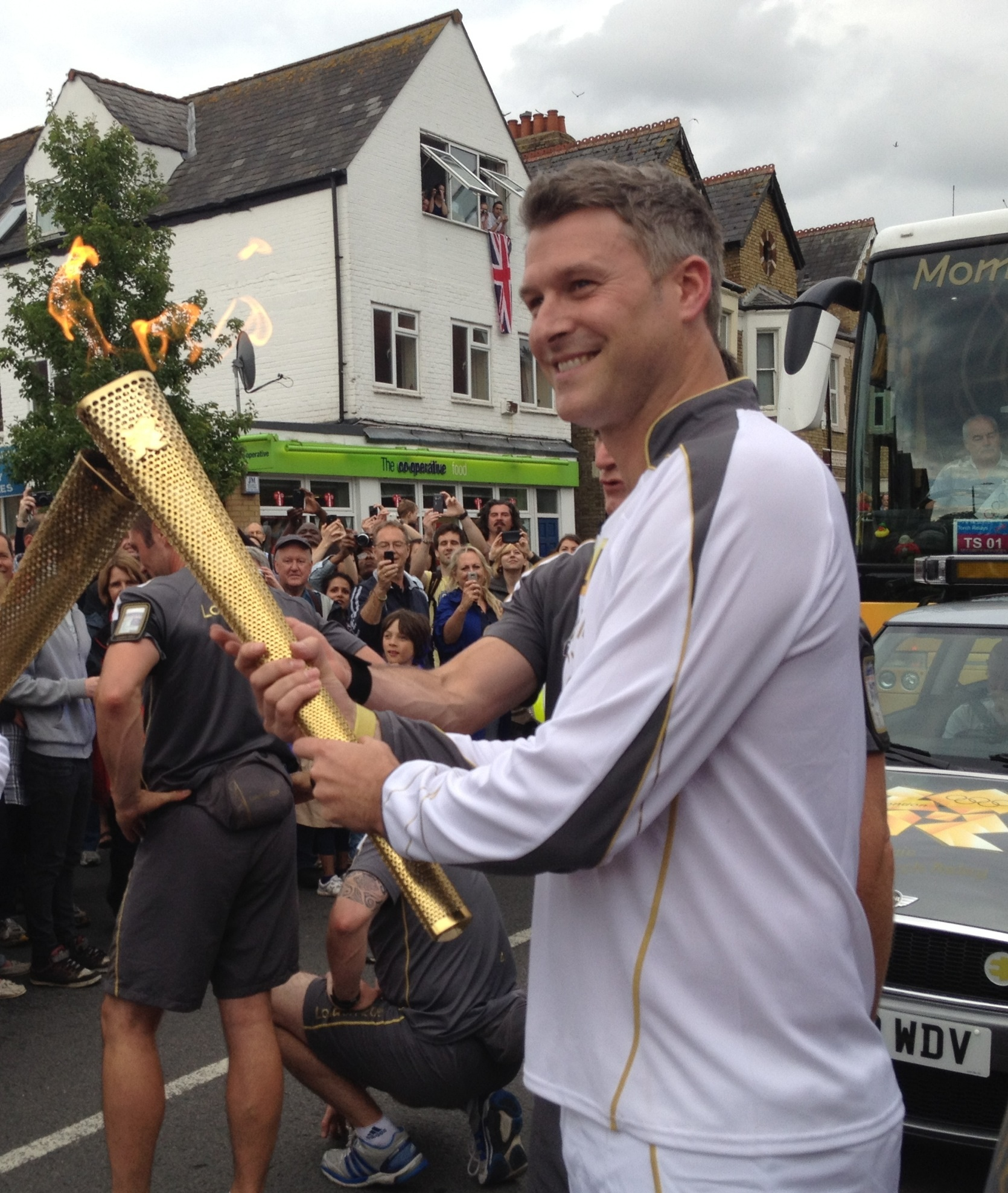
- Dan Lobb carrying the Olympic Torch in Oxford
- Born: Daniel Jonathon Lobb; 7 January 1972 (age 54); Colden Common, Hampshire, England
- Occupations: Tennis player, TV presenter
- Years active: 2001–2013, 2015-2016
- Notable credit(s): Daybreak; GMTV; Sky Sports; Strictly Come Dancing; Cowboy Builders

Daniel Jonathon Lobb (born 7 January 1972) is a British retired tennis player and television presenter, best known for co-presenting the ITV Breakfast programme Daybreak from 2010 until 2012. Between 2015 and 2016, he co-presented Cowboy Builders on Channel 5.

== Early life ==
Lobb grew up in Colden Common near Winchester, Hampshire. He attended Peter Symonds College in Winchester, where he studied Biology, Chemistry and Economics.

== Tennis career ==
Lobb was assisted by College Prospects of America to gain a tennis scholarship to the University of Tennessee at Martin in the USA. He was named as an All-American (for tennis) and graduated from the school of Business with high honours. After coaching at various tennis clubs in London, Lobb played professionally for three years reaching a British ranking of 18 in 1997. After retiring in 1998 he combined coaching and modelling for three years as well as getting involved in sports PR and marketing in London.

== Broadcasting career ==
In 2001, Lobb started part-time work at a local cable station assisting the sports producer before being given the opportunity to present a live show. From there he moved on to 5 News and was offered a contract by Sky Sports in January 2002, presenting mostly on Sky Sports News. In October 2007, he began presenting The Club on Sky Poker, a humorous magazine show based around Poker. He presented with Matt Broughton. On 30 December 2008 during a live Sky Sports News programme, Lobb was co-presenting with Simon Thomas when it was revealed that this would be Lobb's final appearance on the channel. Thomas thanked Lobb for his seven-year service and joked that he was "still the only presenter to have beat Tim Henman - as he has liked to remind us over 400 times!" (This was in reference to Lobb's professional tennis career). In May 2009, Lobb became a sports presenter on Sky News.

Lobb moved to GMTV as the sports correspondent in January 2010. He transferred to the replacement programme Daybreak on 6 September 2010, appointed sports editor, and stand-in presenter. On 2 September, he took over from Adrian Chiles as the Friday co-presenter of Daybreak and on 6 December 2011 he took over from Chiles full-time on an interim basis. Aled Jones was appointed as Chiles' permanent replacement with Lobb leaving the programme on 31 August 2012.

On 6 September 2011, it was announced that Lobb would take part in the 2011 series of Strictly Come Dancing on BBC One. He was partnered with Katya Virshilas. He was the second person to be voted off the show. In January 2013 he presented a one-off Ping pong event for Sky Sports.

In 2015, Lobb returned to television as a co-presenter of Cowboy Builders on Channel 5. The show ended in 2016.

Lobb has been a commentator on Wimbledon television broadcasts for Wimbledon Broadcasting Services.

In 2023, he released his first documentary, Silver Servers, about super senior tennis players, including Kingdon Van Nostrand and John Powless.

== Filmography ==
Television
Year	Title	Role
2002–08	Sky Sports; Sky Sports News	Presenter
2009	Sky News	Sports presenter
2009	Most Annoying People	Himself
2010	GMTV	Sports presenter
2010–12	Daybreak	Sports editor (2010–11), Acting main presenter (2011–12)
2011	Strictly Come Dancing	Contestant
2012	Britain's Secret Treasures	Contributor
2012	The Chase: Celebrity Chase	Contestant
2015—2016	Cowboy Builders	Co-presenter
2023	Silver Servers (documentary)	Director and writer
