= Tonight (1999 TV programme) =

British current affairs programme

- Also known as: The Tonight Programme; Tonight with Trevor McDonald (1999–2007, 2008)
- Genre: News, current affairs, human interest
- Presented by: Trevor McDonald (1999–2007, 2008); Julie Etchingham (2010–2022); Paul Brand (2022–present)
- Country of origin: United Kingdom
- Original language: English

Production
- Running time: 25 minutes
- Production companies: ITV Studios, ITN or Multistory Media for ITV News & Current Affairs

Original release
- Network: ITV
- Release: 8 April 1999 – present

Related
- World in Action (1963–1998); ITV News; Exposure; Peston

Tonight (often referred to as The Tonight Programme and formerly known as Tonight with Trevor McDonald) is a British current affairs programme, produced by ITV Studios (formerly Granada Television), ITN and Multistory Media for the ITV network, replacing the long-running investigative series World in Action on 8 April 1999. Previously airing twice-weekly, on Monday and Friday evenings at 8.00pm (ITV Wales, STV and UTV would often air the programme at different times or different days, to make way for regional programming), the show runs the gamut from human interest-led current affairs to investigative journalism.

Tonight has conducted interviews with a plethora of political and public figures, including U.S. President George W. Bush, Prime Minister Tony Blair and former U.S First Lady Hillary Clinton.

From 1999 to 2007 and briefly in 2008, the programme was known as Tonight with Trevor McDonald. The programme currently airs on Thursdays, usually at 7.30pm on ITV1 and 10.45pm on STV, with Paul Brand as host from March 2022.

== Format ==
The format of Tonight consists of a long-form news story which present an angle on a major development, often following up on an investigation instigated by a national newspaper or news network.

Many topics centre on allegations of wrongdoing and corruption on the part of corporations, politicians, and other public officials. The show also features profiles. The profiles are occasionally of celebrities and offer a biography of the figure, followed by a sit-down interview. Rather than offering a simple publicity platform, a celebrity will often feature after a period of intense media scrutiny, such was the case when the model Naomi Campbell appeared after there were claims she had a substance abuse problem. Non-celebrity profiles usually feature a person who has accomplished an heroic action.

The programme's format differs significantly to the BBC's newsmagazine Panorama as it often remains focused on human interest-led agenda, rather than political or world affairs. Many of the topics are follow-ups to stories from tabloid newspapers, chosen for their level of public interest.

The show gained greater public attention for its high-profile interviews, such as with the parents of murdered schoolboy Damilola Taylor, the five suspects in the Stephen Lawrence murder case and Trevor Rees-Jones, the sole survivor of the crash which killed Princess Diana.

Following the September 11 attacks in New York City in 2001, the show shifted its focus to more "heavyweight" topics such as the impending war and featured numerous reports from Afghanistan and Washington respectively, with Trevor McDonald interviewing U.S. Secretary of State Colin Powell in December of the same year.

In an emotionally charged and highly controversial episode, airing on 30 October 2001, Martin Bashir interviewed the television star Michael Barrymore for the first time about the events that led to a man dying in the swimming pool at his home. The entertainer said he felt remorse and responsibility, igniting a tabloid backlash. The edition was the most-watched in Tonight's history.

Tonight will often react to major news stories as they happen, with scheduled ITV shows pre-empted. Notable major events in recent times have been "Terror in London – A Tonight Special" after the terrorist attack in London (2017 Westminster attack) and "The Manchester Attack – A Tonight Special" after the Manchester Arena bombing.

Reacting to the shock announcement of the 2017 United Kingdom general election two months earlier, Tonight programmed special "Leader Interview" specials – which gave each of the major political parties their own respective programmes via an interview with Julie Etchingham. Family and friends of the party leaders were also interviewed.

It was after "The Leader Interviews: Theresa May" programme when the Prime Minister Theresa May went viral for revealing the naughtiest thing she had ever done was "running through fields of wheat" as a child in her interview with Etchingham.

On 24 February 2022, Russia launched a large-scale invasion of Ukraine. War in Europe - A Tonight Special was broadcast across the ITV network on the same night, reacting to the developing story. Julie Etchingham presented the live programme from the ITV News studio, with reports from correspondents in Ukraine, Russia and in the studio.

In 2024, an edition with new host Paul Brand interviewing Rishi Sunak during the general election campaign aired, for which Sunak had controversially left the Normandy landings early. During the interview, he appeared to suggest that there were "many things I would have wanted as a kid that I couldn't have", including Sky TV, in an effort to suggest he understood the problems facing ordinary people. Sunak was widely mocked for the remark, and the interview received significant coverage and attracted memes after ITV released parts of the interview a week prior to broadcast.

== Controversies ==
While the show often features interviews with global newsmakers, Tonight sometimes makes global headlines itself.

Living with Michael Jackson
A 3 February 2003 episode featuring Martin Bashir interviewing Michael Jackson led to the singer being charged for sexual molestation. An interview with Jackson was very special, for it had been extremely rare for Jackson to allow such access to his personal life, or indeed to talk so freely about his childhood. The special two-hour episode was heavily criticised, with numerous claims that the documentary had presented the singer in an unfavourable light. After the episode aired on U.S. network ABC, a follow-up "rebuttal" interview with Jackson was broadcast, featuring a surplus of material Bashir had omitted from his film.

Charles Ingram (Major Fraud)
In the same year (21 April 2003), the magazine aired segments from the 2001 Who Wants to Be a Millionaire? episode in which Major Charles Ingram was accused of cheating. It was the first time outside of court that the clips had aired and the edition was heavily promoted throughout the week, airing immediately after a highly rated episode of Coronation Street. Again, the programme was criticised for its bias, with Charles Ingram claiming in an interview with Diane Sawyer for US network ABC that Tonight refused to allow him to defend the allegations on air. This episode would later air in the US as a special episode of Primetime Thursday with Charles Gibson and Diane Sawyer on 8 May 2003, using some of the footage from this episode. While Bashir hosted this episode from the set in London, in place of McDonald, Sawyer solely hosted this episode, also from the set in London, upon Charles Gibson's night off.

The above episodes attracted 15.32 and 16.1 million viewers respectively.

== On-air team ==
=== Presenters ===
Sir Trevor McDonald presented links for the programme. During this time the programme was known as Tonight with Trevor McDonald. He left in late 2007, with the return of News at Ten on Monday, 14 January 2008, which McDonald co-presented, along with Julie Etchingham, until 20 November 2008.

However, on 6 November 2008 McDonald presented links again for the programme, though this is thought to be a one-off as it was a high-profile 9pm slot. Trevor would stay with the programme, to report on high-profile stories until 2009. When he was not presenting links, he was an interviewer talking to people in some places, for example he interviewing tenor Russell Watson on the 30 May 2008 edition of the programme.

In October 2009, it was announced that Etchingham would present the relaunched programme on 7 January 2010 – with the show airing once a week on Thursdays at 7:30pm, or later in some regions.

Julie presented the programme for the final time on 3 February 2022, announcing that she would now be reporting for the show.

On 9 March 2022, Paul Brand was confirmed to be the new presenter of the programme.

=== Reporters ===
The programme's reporters have included:

- Antoine Allen (2026)
- Fiona Foster
- Martin Lewis
- Jonathan Maitland (1999—)
- Aasmah Mir
- Adam Shaw
- Ranvir Singh (2014–2016, 2018)
- Helen Skelton (2016, 2018—)
- Martin Bashir
- Ginny Buckley
- Chris Choi (2017—)
- Vanessa Collingridge
- Laura Kuenssberg
- Michael Nicholson
- Melissa Porter
- Chris Rogers
- Geraint Vincent
- Quentin Willson
- Kirsty Young
- Morland Sanders
- Mark Williams-Thomas
- Carol Barnes
- Mark Jordan

=== Guest reporters ===
- Mark Austin (2010, 2014; 3 episodes)
- Mary Nightingale (2010; 1 episode)
- Joel Hills (2014; 1 episode)
- Charlene White (2014, 2016; 2 episodes)
- Catherine Tyldesley (2015–2017; 3 episodes)
- Alex Beresford (2015–2016; 2 episodes)
- Robert Moore (2016–2017; 3 episodes)
- Janet Street-Porter (2016; 1 episode)
- Robert Peston (2016; 2 episodes)
- Tom Bradby (2016; 1 episode)
- Rageh Omaar (2017; 1 episode)
- Kylie Pentelow (2017; 1 episode)
- Georgie Barrat (2017; 1 episode)
- Noreena Hertz (2017; 2 episodes)
- Hayley Hassall (2017; 1 episode)
- Dan Clark-Neal (2017; 1 episode)
- Ruth Dodsworth (2022; 1 episode)
- Susanna Reid (2023; 1 episode)

== See also ==
- Murder of Deborah Linsley – high-profile unsolved murder case which Tonight appealed for information on in 2002
- Murder of Billie-Jo Jenkins – the alleged murderer in the case, Siôn Jenkins, was interviewed for an episode of Tonight in 2006

Preceded by ITV News at Ten	RTS: Television Journalism; Programme of the Year (The Prime Suspects); 2000	Succeeded by ITV Evening News
Preceded by Dispatches: Beneath The Veil	RTS: Television Journalism; Programme of the Year; 2003	Succeeded by Living with Michael Jackson: A Tonight Special
