= Lucy Holleron =

English journalist and presenter

Lucy Holleron (née Kite) (born 1 April 1977) is an English journalist and presenter. She is originally from Breaston, Derbyshire.

== Career ==
Holleron graduated from Nottingham Trent University in 1998 with a degree in Broadcast Journalism.

In January 2002, she became a news presenter and producer on Central Tonight for ITV Central.

In January 2006, she was appointed the entertainment correspondent, conducting celebrity interviews and reporting for a weekly feature Entertainment Tonight. Holleron also presented Sky High, a regional programme covering views of the Midlands from a helicopter, until she was replaced by Ruth England.

On 3 November 2008, she was appointed as a fill-in presenter on the now defunct West Midlands edition of Central Tonight for the following three months.

From 23 February 2009 until 24 May 2016, she was the weather presenter in the East and West Midlands, whilst also deputising as a news presenter.

In August 2010, she presented the weather forecasts on London Tonight for ITV London. On 28 December 2010, she guest presented the weather forecasts on Daybreak for ITV Breakfast.

Holleron is also an events host, qualified yoga teacher and writer.
