= Sonia Ruseler =

Argentine news anchor

Sonia Ruseler (born 28 November 1963 in Buenos Aires, Argentina), studied social and political sciences at Cambridge University.

Once graduating from the University, Sonia joined ITN, and worked for Channel 4 News 1989 - 1992, and ITV news from 1992-1993 which included the weekday lunchtime news. Around the same time Sonia also worked for the BBC as a producer In May 1993 Sonia CNN International An Argentine and Dutch national, she worked as a senior vice president at The McGinn Group, and Chlopak Leonard and Schechter, both strategic communications consultancy based in Washington D.C. She was senior director, corporate communications for Arcos Dorados, the largest McDonald's franchisee in the world, with operations in Latin America and the Caribbean.
