= Ross King (presenter) =

Television presenter, actor, and writer

Ross King MBE
- Born: Derek Ross King; 21 February 1962 (age 64); Glasgow, Scotland
- Occupations: Television and radio presenter, actor, producer, writer
- Years active: 1966–present
- Employer: ITV
- Agent(s): Castle Place; Lizzie Barroll Brown
- Television: The 8:15 from Manchester; Pebble Mill; KTLA; GMTV; This Morning; Daybreak; Lorraine; Good Morning Britain
- Spouses: Helen Way (m. 1999; div. 2006); Brianna Deutsch (m. 2015; div. 2019)
- Website: www.rossking.com

Derek Ross King (born 21 February 1962) is a Scottish television presenter, actor and writer, best known for being the LA Correspondent for ITV Breakfast programmes Lorraine and Good Morning Britain. In the 2018 New Year Honours, King was appointed an MBE for services to broadcasting, the arts and charity.

== Life ==
King made his first stage appearance in 1966 at the age of four. At the age of 17, he appeared on Radio Clyde, presenting the Saturday morning flagship "King's Clyde Countdown" and “The Lunchtime Show”. Two years later, he made his television debut. King presented Young Krypton in 1988 on CITV, a show based on The Krypton Factor, aimed towards younger audiences.

From 1993 to 2010, King was the LA correspondent on GMTV. From September 2010, he has been the LA correspondent for GMTV's replacement shows Daybreak and Lorraine. When Daybreak was replaced by Good Morning Britain in 2014, King continued his role as LA correspondent. After moving to Los Angeles in 2000, he secured roles in a film with Steven Seagal and in the 2004 release The Day After Tomorrow before entering a reality TV competition run by local television station KTLA to find a new weather presenter. After beating the other 5,000 entrants to the competition, King was offered a five-year contract. However, King did not want to commit to being a weather presenter for that length of time and agreed to present the weather for a year before becoming KTLA's entertainment anchor.

King has been on national American television, hosting The Hollywood Christmas Parade and The Critics' Choice Movie Awards Red Carpet for VH1. For five years, King was the entertainment anchor on KTLA/The CW Channel 5's Prime News, winning four Emmys and a Golden Mic award. He is also seen on Australia's Channel 9.

King's film credits include The Day After Tomorrow, Half Past Dead, Cruel Game, Do It For Uncle Manny, Abruptio, and Trust Me in which he played US talk show host Ray Lunge. He played himself in the movies Young Hercules and Who's Your Caddy. He voiced the role of Jinkins in Star Wars Jedi Fighter 2 for Lucas Arts and hosted for British TV, ITV's This Morning and Living TV specials on Will and Grace, CSI, According to Jim and Charmed. Before leaving London, he played one of the leading roles in Dick Whittington at Sadler's Wells Theatre in London's West End. This production was directed by Gillian Lynne and was nominated for a Laurence Olivier Award.

King played Frank n Furter in The Rocky Horror Show and starred in and hosted Night of the Stars at London's Palladium Theatre. He also created the role of Wallace in the musical Summer Holiday, from the world premiere in Blackpool through the national tour to London's Apollo Theatre. Other theatre lead roles include in Charley's Aunt, Joseph and the Amazing Technicolor Dreamcoat, Butterfly Children and Guys and Dolls.

King has appeared on Holiday, The Ross King Show, Hot Chefs, The 8.15 from Manchester, King of the Road, Quiz Night, and Pebble Mill.

On radio, he has hosted shows, including on London's Capital Radio, and the Euro Chart for the UK. On BBC's National Radio 5 Live, he hosted different shows, including Fantasy Football, and received another Sony Award for coverage of the Olympic Games. On the UK's national Talk Radio, he hosted OK to Talk and Ross King's Sports Stars. He also achieved a lifelong ambition by co-hosting the American Weekly Top 40 countdown alongside the DJ Rick Dees. He was appointed an MBE in the 2018 New Year Honours.

In August 2025, King was announced as a contestant on the twenty-third series of Strictly Come Dancing. He was paired with Jowita Przystał. They were the second couple to be eliminated from the competition in the third week, placing 14th.
