= Hilary Jones (doctor) =

British GP and media personality

Hilary Jones MBE
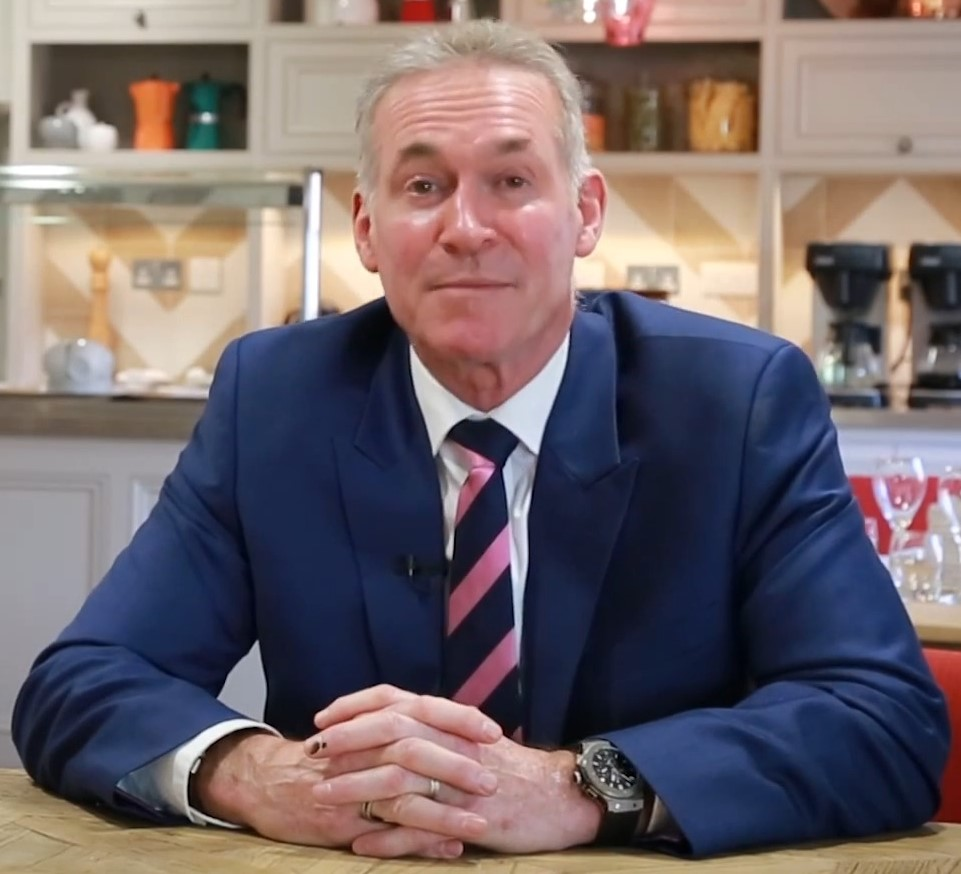
- Jones in 2016
- Born: Hilary Robert Jones; 19 June 1953 (age 73); Hammersmith, London, England
- Years active: 1976-present (medical) 1989-present (media)
- Television: TV-AM; GMTV; Lorraine; Dancing on Ice; Good Morning Britain
- Spouses: Anne Marie Vives (m. 1977–1987); Sarah Harvey (m. 1990–2009); Dee Jones (m. 2016)
- Children: 5
- Website: www.drhilaryjones.com

Hilary Robert Jones MBE (born 19 June 1953) is an English general practitioner, presenter and writer on medical issues, known for his media appearances, most often on television. He has written for News of the World and The Sun on Sunday magazines.

== Medical career ==
Jones was born in Hammersmith, London. He attended Latymer Upper School before qualifying as a medical doctor at the Royal Free Hospital, London in 1976. He then held various positions, including being the only medical officer on Tristan da Cunha in the South Atlantic in 1978. Returning to the UK, he became a junior doctor at Basingstoke Hospital, and from 1982, became a full-time Principal General Practitioner in the Basingstoke area. Jones became a GP Trainer in 1987 and as of 2010 still practised part-time as a National Health Service (NHS) general practitioner.

== Media career ==
=== Television ===
Jones became the TV-am doctor from May 1989 and has featured regularly on GMTV since 1993, where he was the health and medical adviser. In 2010, GMTV was replaced by Daybreak and Lorraine, where Jones continued to work as Health Editor. In 2014, Daybreak was replaced by Good Morning Britain, with Jones transferring to the show. As part of this role, he reports on emerging medical news stories as well as informing the public about various medical problems such as weight issues, contraception, surgery and cancer. Jones has been appearing on the programme throughout each morning during the coronavirus pandemic.

Jones also co-presented The Health Show with Terry Wogan and presented weekly social action programme Loud & Clear for three years for Meridian Television. He appeared as a panellist on the 2002 docucomedy series Dave Gorman's Important Astrology Experiment.

Jones participated in the fifth series of Dancing on Ice, partnered with Alexandra Schauman, but was voted off on Valentine's Day (Week 6) after Danny Young was saved by the judges in the skate off.

In 2013, Jones appeared on The Chase Celebrity Special (series 3, episode 3). He and the other members of the team, including Charlotte Jackson, defeated "The Chaser", Paul Sinha, and won £100,000 for charity.

=== Radio ===
Jones has had a regular guest slot on Steve Wright's BBC Radio 2 programme since 2000 discussing medical matters.

=== Online ===
Jones previously worked as a medical adviser for online clinic HealthExpress where he featured in a number of health advice videos and hosted live ‘Twitter Clinics.’ As part of these Twitter clinics, Jones offered tailor-made information on various health-related questions posed by the public. He is also actively involved in brand radio sessions, exhibitions and events.

Jones is the official ambassador for the UK telecare provider Telecare24, supporting their 24/7 monitoring service. He contributes regular expert health articles covering key wellness and medical topics, such as epilepsy, cancer and dementia, exclusively for the Telecare24 blog.

Jones featured in a supportive film for WaterAid’s social media channels.

=== Writing ===
Jones wrote a weekly column for the News of the World dealing with medical problems and health issues until the newspaper closed in July 2011. He also answered readers' health questions in the newspaper's Sunday Magazine, and did the same in Rosemary Conley's Diet and Fitness magazine. He edits and contributes to his own magazine Family Healthcare with Dr Hilary Jones.

Jones has also written a number of health-related books. His first novel A Day In Your Life, published in August 2009, reached number six in the top ten hardback non-fiction bestseller list. His WWI novel, Frontline, was published in September 2021.

A full list of Jones' written works can be found below:

- I'm Too Busy to be Stressed: How to Recognise and Relieve the Symptoms of Stress (1997)
- Total Wellbeing: The Whole Treatment for the Whole You - An Integrated Approach to Health (Co authored with Brenda Davies, 1999)
- Doctor, What's the Alternative? All You Need to Know About Complementary Therapies (1999)
- A Change for the Better: How to Survive and Thrive During the Menopause (2000)
- What’s Up Doc? (2010)
- A Day in Your Life: 24 Hours Inside the Human Body (2013)
- Frontline (2021)

== Paid directorships ==
In 2019, Jones joined London-based nutraceutical company MedTate as a non-executive director to support pharmacies across the United Kingdom.

== Personal life ==
Jones is the son of a GP. His elder son, Tristan, named after Tristan da Cunha, where Jones was working while married to his French-born wife, Anne Marie Vives, is also a GP. Their younger son, Sebastian, is a lawyer.

He has three children, (including twins) from his second marriage, to Sarah Harvey, which ended after his affair with a colleague was made public. He married a third time, to fitness coach Dee Thresher, in 2016.

Jones was appointed Member of the Order of the British Empire (MBE) in the 2020 Birthday Honours for services to broadcasting, public health information and charity.

Jones is a patron of The Meningitis Research Foundation, The Lauren Currie Twilight Foundation, and the Pancreatic Cancer Action.

Jones has been a spokesperson for the School and Nursery Milk Alliance since 2016.
