= Daybreak (2010 TV programme) =

British breakfast TV programme

- Daybreak final logo used from 2012
- Created by: ITV Breakfast (2010–2014)
- Presented by: See full list of Daybreak presenters and reporters
- Country of origin: United Kingdom
- Original language: English

Production
- Production locations: Studio 7, The London Studios (2010–12); Studio 3, The London Studios (2012–14)
- Running time: 150 minutes (includes adverts)
- Production company: ITV Breakfast Limited – part of ITV Studios

Original release
- Network: ITV
- Release: 6 September 2010 – 25 April 2014

Related
- GMTV (1993–2010); Good Morning Britain (2014–present)

Daybreak is a British breakfast television programme that was broadcast on ITV from 6 September 2010 to 25 April 2014. Daybreak replaced GMTV, which aired its last weekday edition on 3 September 2010. Daybreak launched three days later.

In March 2014, ITV announced that the show would end later in 2014 to be replaced by the launch of Good Morning Britain on 28 April 2014.

== History ==
Daybreak logo (January–September 2012)

The decision to replace GMTV with Daybreak followed the full takeover of GMTV by ITV. Daybreak and Lorraine made up the weekday output of ITV Breakfast. At weekends, children's programming filled this slot. An advertising campaign, promoting the new franchise, started on 23 August, with short break-bumpers in between the start and end of an advertisement break, broadcast during the evening schedule of ITV.

=== Pre-launch ===
Chiles and Bleakley presented The One Show on BBC One together for nearly three years before leaving to join ITV.

=== First edition ===
The first edition of Daybreak was broadcast on 6 September 2010 with ex-hosts Chiles and Bleakley introducing viewers to the new set and admiring the view from the window. It included an interview with Tony Blair and a lead story by John Stapleton on the collapse of the Farepak Christmas savings club in 2006. Views of regional locations around the United Kingdom were broadcast as well as a tour of the studio. The press offered a mixed reception to the first edition.

=== Transition from ITV Breakfast to ITV Studios ===
In March 2011, ITV announced that it was incorporating Daybreak into its ITV News operation as part of a management restructure. In July of that year, it was announced that production of the slot, along with that of sister programme Lorraine, would be taken over by ITV Studios.

In August, This Morning executive Karl Newton was being charged with the transition to ITV Studios and was revamping the slot to give it 'one last throw of the dice' to boost its ratings. On 2 September, ITV announced that former BBC Breakfast Chief, David Kermode (formerly editor of 5 News) was to take over as editor of the programme from 1 December, heralding a major revamp to the presenting team and the format. On 6 September, Daybreak celebrated its first anniversary on air. Two days later, Paul Connolly (the deputy editor) had departed from Daybreak.

=== Relaunch ===
On 12 December 2011, it was reported that Daybreak would target 'hassled mums' as part of its refreshed focus and format changes, and a new presenting team were expected to be introduced in April 2012; however, these plans were delayed. On 26 April, it was reported that ITV was to move Daybreak to the studio currently used by sister programme Lorraine.

On 19 November 2011, it was reported that original presenters Adrian Chiles and Christine Bleakley had been axed. Chiles confirmed that they were to depart from Daybreak in the New Year; however, they left on 5 December, stating that 'we were assured we could go with our dignity intact'. Dan Lobb and Kate Garraway took over on an interim basis, until new presenters were announced. On 8 December, ITV chief executive Adam Crozier defended the decision of hiring Chiles and Bleakley, saying it was necessary to 'take a risk'.

On 4 May 2012, Aled Jones and Lorraine Kelly were confirmed by ITV as the new permanent presenters. Jones said 'I am thoroughly looking forward to sharing the sofa every morning with such a consummate professional as Lorraine Kelly.'

On 28 May, Ranvir Singh announced she was leaving BBC North West Tonight to join Daybreak, where she would present the first hour of the slot. On 11 June, 5 News presenter Matt Barbet was confirmed as Singh's co-presenter.

On 28 August, it was confirmed Singh would become the newsreader following the first hour of Daybreak, and that BBC Weather presenter Laura Tobin was joining the slot. Garraway would present Daybreak on Fridays and cover for full-time host Lorraine Kelly in a new two-year contract.

On 28 August, the new Daybreak logo was unveiled. The revamped format was launched on 3 September; this was greeted with a mixed reaction from viewers on social media, with some newspapers reporting that viewers reacted negatively to the 'old fashioned' garish set. However, some viewers liked the change and praised the step back to the original format of GMTV which the core audience had asked to return. Despite the changes to the ailing format, the first edition of the new-look Daybreak drew only 600,000 viewers. Throughout September, the programme averaged around 700,000 viewers, as viewers begun to warm to the original GMTV-style format and new presenters. In October, ratings continued to average at 700,000 viewers, occasionally peaking at 800,000 viewers.

On 15 February 2014, Kelly announced she was to leave Daybreak later in the year. She had signed a new contract to now present Lorraine each Monday to Friday.

On 4 April (three weeks before the final edition of Daybreak), Barbet co-presented for the final time, which made him the fourth presenter to leave after Chiles, Bleakley and Lobb. On 10 April, Kelly presented her final Daybreak before her Easter break, to concentrate on Lorraine, as part of a new contract she was offered. On 25 April, Daybreak officially came to an end, hosted by Jones and Garraway.

== Presenters ==
Role	Daybreak & The Daybreak NewsHour					
Role	2010	2011	2012 (January – August)	2012 (September – December)	2013	2014
Lead Presenter	Adrian Chiles	Adrian Chiles	Dan Lobb	Aled Jones	Aled Jones	Aled Jones
Lead Presenter	Christine Bleakley	Christine Bleakley	Kate Garraway	Lorraine Kelly	Lorraine Kelly	Lorraine Kelly
Main Presenter	John Stapleton	John Stapleton	John Stapleton	John Stapleton	John Stapleton	John Stapleton
Main Presenter	Kate Garraway	Kate Garraway		Kate Garraway	Kate Garraway	Kate Garraway
Main Presenter				Matt Barbet	Matt Barbet	Matt Barbet
Main Presenter				Ranvir Singh	Ranvir Singh	Ranvir Singh
Newsreader	Tasmin Lucia-Khan	Tasmin Lucia-Khan	Lucy Watson	Ranvir Singh	Ranvir Singh	Ranvir Singh
Health Editor	Dr Hilary Jones	Dr Hilary Jones	Dr Hilary Jones	Dr Hilary Jones	Dr Hilary Jones	Dr Hilary Jones
Weather	Lucy Verasamy	Lucy Verasamy	Lucy Verasamy	Laura Tobin	Laura Tobin	Laura Tobin
Weather	Kirsty McCabe (until February)	Kirsty McCabe (until February)	Kirsty McCabe (until February)	Laura Tobin	Laura Tobin	Laura Tobin
Weather	Alex Beresford (Relief)	Alex Beresford (Relief)	Alex Beresford (Relief)	Alex Beresford (Relief)	Alex Beresford (Relief)	Alex Beresford (Relief)
Entertainment Editor	Kate Garraway	Kate Garraway	Kate Garraway (until June)	Richard Arnold	Richard Arnold	Richard Arnold
Entertainment Editor	Kate Garraway	Kate Garraway	Richard Arnold (June onwards)	Richard Arnold	Richard Arnold	Richard Arnold
Entertainment Correspondent	Steve Hargrave	Steve Hargrave	Steve Hargrave			
Los Angeles Correspondent	Ross King	Ross King	Ross King	Ross King	Ross King	Ross King

== Format ==
Daybreak was a news, lifestyle and entertainment magazine programme interspersed with celebrity interviews, consumer and health items and reports from locations around the UK.

=== 6 am – 7 am (The Daybreak News-Hour) ===
Matt Barbet and Ranvir Singh presented 'The 'Daybreak News-Hour'. The presenters also talked to guests and reviewed the front pages of the newspapers throughout the hour. John Stapleton, Helen Fospero or Louisa James act as stand-in presenters for this section of the programme.

=== 7 am – 8:30 am (Daybreak) ===
Aled Jones and Lorraine Kelly presented the main part of the slot from 7 am until 8:30 am, focusing on human interest stories, showbiz gossip and lifestyle features. News, Sport and Weather updates were presented by Ranvir Singh and Laura Tobin, along with a team of correspondents and experts. Kate Garraway, Matt Barbet or John Stapleton were stand-in presenters for this section, with Barbet occasionally presenting the whole slot from 6 am until 8:30 am. Helen Fospero occasionally presented the show on a stand-in basis.

=== News ===
The news bulletins were presented by Ranvir Singh (or Helen Fospero or Louisa James, if Singh was not present) from the 'Daybreak News-Desk' at 7 am and 8 am with headlines at 7:30 am and again at 9 am on sister programme Lorraine Reports are presented by members of the programme's news team.

=== News Review ===
On some mornings, the main headlines on the front pages and articles from the inside of the morning newspapers were discussed with two guests on the programme. This was a regular feature between September 2012 and the Summer of 2013, but later became an occasional feature, although the front pages were always shown by Matt Barbet. Victoria Derbyshire, Kevin Maguire, Martel Maxwell and Michael Portillo were occasional newspaper reviewers; they often featured on sister programme Lorraine to discuss the main newspaper headlines at 8:35 am.

=== National weather ===
The national Daybreak weather forecast by Laura Tobin was presented at around 6:08 am, 6:25 am, 6:55 am, 7:25 am, 7:55 am and 8:25 am. In December 2010, Daybreak featured extensive coverage of the severe winter weather affecting much of the UK. (Previously, the forecast was presented outdoors via a terrace.) A news ticker was introduced to provide updates on transport information during the blizzards that affected much of the country's transport infrastructure at the time. Sometimes the forecasts are shot from an outside location, such as Leeds Castle or Epsom Downs Racecourse.

=== Entertainment ===
Los Angeles correspondent Ross King presented all the latest news from Hollywood. Showbiz editor Richard Arnold presented the showbiz updates on Daybreak at 7:50 am weekdays. Items ranged from music news, celebrity gossip and interviews.

=== Politics ===
Political editor Sue Jameson presented the political news on Daybreak often as part of the news updates at the top of the hour. She also appeared on the Daybreak sofa and went live to Westminster or Downing Street for the Breaking News stories.

=== Financial ===
Martin Lewis is a money-saving expert who gave financial advice to viewers ranging from Gas, Electricity, Credit Cards, Insurance, Holidays, Savings, etc. He usually appeared on Daybreak on Thursdays.

=== Health ===
Daybreak health editor Dr. Hilary Jones presented the health articles and gave viewers advice on medical problems such as weight issues, contraception, surgery and cancer.

== Reception ==
Daybreak was nominated for a National Television Award in the "Magazine Programme of the Year" category for 2011, but failed to make the final shortlist.
