= Alex Beresford =

English weather presenter

- Born: Alexander Beresford; 17 October 1980 (age 45); Bristol, England
- Occupation: Weather presenter
- Years active: 2004–present
- Employer: ITV
- Notable credit(s): Good Morning Britain, ITV Evening News, ITV Weather
- Children: 2

Alexander Beresford (born 17 October 1980) is an English weather presenter employed by ITV.

== Early life ==
Beresford was born in Bristol, England. His mother is English and his father is Guyanese. He grew up in the Eastville area of Bristol and went to the St Thomas More RC School (now Fairfield High School) in Eastville.

== Career ==
Beresford primarily worked for The West Tonight on ITV West based in Bristol, originally as a teleprompter operator in August 2004, but later retrained as a weather presenter in 2005.

He has also presented the national ITV Weather since 26 November 2007.

In February 2009 he transferred to The West Country Tonight on ITV West Country following the demise of ITV West.

He was set to join the ITV Breakfast programme Daybreak as its weather presenter on a permanent basis, this after he made a guest appearance, presenting on 16 March 2012. However, he quit for personal reasons, but still continued to present on a stand-in basis for Laura Tobin. Daybreak was axed on 25 April 2014; it was replaced by a new show, Good Morning Britain where Beresford has continued to provide cover for Tobin. He appears both in the studio and on location at events elsewhere.

Beginning on 30 April 2013, Beresford presented a three-part series for Channel 4 called The World's Weirdest Weather. The following year, he hosted four-part Channel 4 series Britain's Most Extreme Weather which began airing on 28 April 2014.

In June 2015, January 2016, April 2019, June 2020 and October 2020 Beresford presented five episodes of ITV's Tonight programme.

On 20 August 2020, Beresford made his debut as a guest presenter of ITV's Good Morning Britain.

On 9 March 2021, the morning after the UK airing of the Oprah with Meghan and Harry interview, Piers Morgan walked off the Good Morning Britain show, following weather presenter Beresford's alternative narrative for Morgan's behaviour.

"Piers Morgan's comments about the Duchess of Sussex on Good Morning Britain have attracted a record number of complaints to TV regulator Ofcom."

From 6 September 2020, Beresford co-presents ITV's All Around Britain, a new weekly topical magazine series.

In March 2022, Alex left his position at ITV West Country to take up the newly created role of live weather presenter on the extended ITV Evening News. Alex presents from the main studios in London, as well as occasionally reporting on the weather from other locations across the UK.

=== Dancing on Ice ===
Beresford took part in the tenth series of Dancing on Ice in 2018, partnered with Brianne Delcourt. He was the eighth celebrity to be eliminated from the show following a skate off with Kem Cetinay and his partner Alex Murphy

=== Other projects ===
Beresford runs a Diversity School Tour Project where he visits inner-city schools to talk about media careers. He was also chosen for the national role model programme for young black men by Hazel Blears.

== Personal life ==
Beresford married Imogen McKay in Mallorca in 2022. They had a daughter, Camille, in February 2025. Beresford also has a son, born c. 2010, from a previous marriage.

== Filmography ==
Year	Title	Role	Notes
2005–2009	The West Tonight	Weather presenter	Started at ITV West in 2004 as an autocue operative
2007–present	ITV Weather	Weather presenter	
2009–2022	ITV News West Country	Weather presenter	
2012–2014	Daybreak	Weather presenter	Stand-in presenter
2013–2014	The World's Weirdest Weather	Presenter	2 series, 11 episodes
2014	Britain's Most Extreme Weather	Presenter	1 series, 4 episodes
2014–present	Good Morning Britain	Weather presenter (2014–present) and guest presenter (2020–2021)	
2015–present	Tonight	Reporter	Episodes: "Alien Invaders", "Floods: Are We Ready for the Future", "Knife Crime and Me", "Car Crime: Is My Car Safe?", "Black and British"
2018	Dancing on Ice	Contestant	Eliminated 8th
2018	Saturday Morning with James Martin	Guest	1 episode
2018	The Chase: Celebrity Special	Contestant	1 episode
2019	Ninja Warrior UK	Contestant	1 episode
2020	Living On The Veg	Guest	1 episode
2020–2021	All Around Britain	Presenter	2 series
2021	Celebrity Catchphrase	Contestant	1 episode
2021	Who Wants to Be a Millionaire? Celebrity Special	Contestant	1 episode
2022	All Star Musicals	Contestant	Won
2022–present	ITV Evening News	Weather presenter	
2023	Celebrity Race Across the World	Contestant	Won with his father Noel
