= Louisa James =

British journalist

Louisa James is an English journalist and newsreader employed by ITV Breakfast, on the Good Morning Britain and Lorraine programmes.
