= Ranvir Singh =

British television presenter (born 1977)

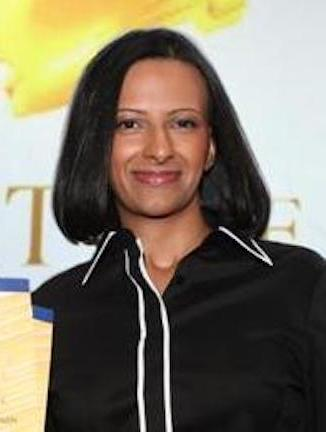
- Singh in 2010
- Born: 11 August 1977 (age 49); Fulwood, Lancashire, England
- Education: Lancaster University, University of Central Lancashire
- Occupations: Journalist; television presenter
- Years active: 2002–present
- Employer: ITV
- Notable credits: BBC North West Tonight (2005–2012); Daybreak (2012–2014); Lorraine (2020–present); Good Morning Britain (2014–present); ITV News (2014–2020); Strictly Come Dancing (2020); Riddiculous (2022–present)
- Spouse: Ranjeet Singh Dehal (m. 2012, divorced)
- Partner: Louis Church (2020–present)
- Children: 1

Ranvir Singh (born 11 August 1977) is a British journalist and television presenter. She is a newsreader and presenter for Good Morning Britain, presenter of Riddiculous and an occasional relief presenter of Lorraine.

== Early life ==
Singh was born in 1977 in Fulwood, Lancashire and grew up in Ribbleton, into a Sikh family. She has two older sisters. Her parents emigrated from the Punjab in India in the 1960s. Her father came over first and her mother followed five years later by which time she already had Singh's eldest sister. Her father died when she was nine years old from a heart attack at the age of 42. Educated at Kirkham Grammar School, an independent school in Kirkham, Lancashire, she graduated from Lancaster University with a degree in English and Philosophy. She then gained a postgraduate qualification in journalism at the School of Journalism, Media and Communication, University of Central Lancashire in Preston.

== Career ==
Singh joined BBC Radio Lancashire in 2002, initially on work experience before being given a six-month contract. She then moved to BBC GMR, covering the 2002 Commonwealth Games in Manchester. Singh joined the BBC North West regional news programme North West Tonight in 2005 as a journalist and bulletin presenter. Her first national presenting role came on Good Friday, 2006 when she co-presented Manchester Passion, a live BBC Three play that retold the last hours of Jesus Christ.

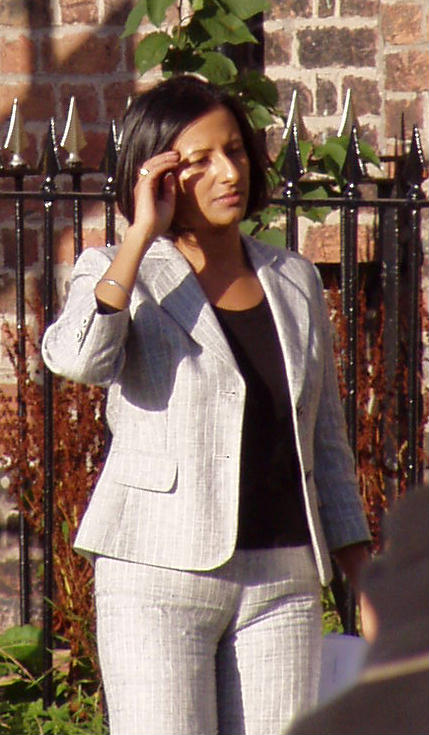
Singh in 2009

On 10 September 2007, Singh joined BBC North West Tonight as a co-presenter. Former BBC South Today sports editor Roger Johnson became Singh's co-presenter in October 2011 following Burns' departure. While working on North West Tonight, Singh was also a regular presenter for late night and weekend breakfast shows on BBC Radio 5 Live. Singh went on maternity leave from North West Tonight on 18 May 2012. Ten days later it was announced that she would not be returning to the BBC but would be joining the ITV Breakfast programme Daybreak. She made her first appearance on Daybreak on 3 September 2012.

In 2012, Singh occasionally reviewed the newspapers on This Morning. In May 2014, Singh joined Good Morning Britain as a features correspondent and news presenter. Since May 2014, Singh has been a relief newscaster on various ITV News bulletins. On 25 September 2014, Singh joined the factual ITV programme Tonight as a reporter. Since March 2015, she has guest presented numerous Exposure specials. From 2015 until 2016, Ranvir presented two primetime series for ITV called Real Stories with Ranvir Singh.

In 2016 and 2017, Singh co-presented The Martin Lewis Money Show alongside Martin Lewis. In January 2017, it was announced that Ranvir had been promoted to Good Morning Britain's Political Editor. Since the summer of 2017, Singh presented Eat, Shop, Save for ITV. In 2017, Singh was presenting Good Morning Britain the day of the 2017 Westminster attack and garnered much praise for her ability to respond and react quickly to the developing story. The Good Morning Britain Team then went on to win a Golden Nymph Award in the ‘Live Breaking News’ category at the 59th Monte-Carlo Television Festival in 2019, beating CNN and Al Jazeera.

Singh's highlights at Good Morning Britain also include travelling around the world on board the RAF Voyager with the Prime Minister, with visits including China, Canada and inside the White House with President Trump, and live reporting from the ground as the Grenfell Tower fire unfolded. Since 2020, Singh has been a guest presenter on Loose Women. On 2 September 2020, it was announced that Singh would be taking part in the eighteenth series of Strictly Come Dancing. She was partnered with Giovanni Pernice. They reached the Semi-Final so were fifth place overall behind the four finalists Jamie Laing, HRVY, Maisie Smith and champion Bill Bailey.

From 6 September 2020, Singh co-presented ten episodes of ITV's All Around Britain, a new weekly topical magazine series. She was replaced with Lorraine entertainment presenter, Ria Hebden, while participating in the 18th series of Strictly Come Dancing. On 16 December 2020, it was announced that Singh would be presenting Lorraine on 21, 22 and 23 December while main presenter, Lorraine Kelly, was on a Christmas Break. In 2021, Singh continued to guest present on Lorraine, and she continues to regularly present in Kelly's absence.

In 2025, Singh was one of the judges of the 'Published Novel' category of the Comedy Women in Print Prize.

== Awards and honours ==
- December 2023: awarded an Honorary Doctorate by Lancaster University
- October 2015: won Media Personality of the Year at the Asian Media Awards
- August 2014: received the Alumni Award from Lancaster University.
- November 2010: awarded 'Best On Screen Talent' at the Royal Television Society's North West Awards

=== Scholastic ===
Chancellor, visitor, governor, rector and fellowships

Location	Date	School	Position
England	13 December 2023 – present	Lancaster University	Honorary Graduate
England	10 July 2013 – present	University of Central Lancashire	Honorary Fellow
England	20 January 2017 – present	University of Central Lancashire	Chancellor

=== Honorary degrees ===
Location	Date	School	Degree	Gave Commencement Address
England	9 December 2015	Edge Hill University	Doctor of Arts (D.Arts)	Yes

== Personal life ==
Singh married Ranjeet Singh Dehal in January 2012. Together, the couple have one son, born in July of that year. They separated when Singh was seven months pregnant. After the birth of her son, she moved from the North West to the Chilterns, following her move from BBC North West to ITV in London.

In December 2021, Singh announced that she was in a relationship with Louis Church, whom she met on Strictly Come Dancing in 2020 when he was working on the show's production team.

== Filmography ==
Television

Year	Title	Role	Notes
2005–2012	North West Tonight	Presenter	
2012	This Morning	Newspaper reviewer	Occasional episodes
2012–2014	Daybreak	Co-presenter	Also newsreader
2012–2014	Lorraine	Newsreader	
2012, 2015	All Star Family Fortunes	Participant	2 episodes
2013	University Challenge	Participant	1 episode
2014–2016, 2018	Tonight	Reporter	Occasional episodes
2014–2015, 2020	ITV News at Ten	Presenter	
2014–2020	ITV Lunchtime News	Presenter	
2014–2020	ITV Evening News	Presenter	
2014–2016, 2022	ITV Weekend News	Presenter	
2014–present	Good Morning Britain	Political Editor	Also relief presenter
2015	Exposure: When Pregnant Women Drink	Reporter	1 episode
2015	The Chase	Participant	1 episode
2015–2016	Real Stories with Ranvir Singh	Presenter	
2016–2017	The Martin Lewis Money Show	Co-presenter	3 episodes
2017–present	Eat, Shop, Save	Presenter	
2020	All Around Britain	Presenter	1 series, 10 episodes, succeeded by Ria Hebden
2020	Tipping Point: Lucky Stars	Participant	Contestant; 1 episode
2020	Strictly Come Dancing	Participant	Contestant; series 18
2020–2021	Loose Women	Guest presenter	9 episodes
2020–present	Lorraine	School holidays presenter	32 episodes
2021	Catchphrase Celebrity Special	Contestant	Series 5, Episode 7; 13 February 2021
2021	Save Money: My Beautiful Green Home	Co-presenter	Three-part ITV series
2021	Michael McIntyre's The Wheel	Celebrity expert	Series 2, Episode 6; 27 November 2021
2021	Rolling In It: Christmas Special	Contestant	Series 2, Christamas special; 18 December 2021
2022	Ghislaine, Prince Andrew and the Paedophile	Presenter	ITV documentary
2022	Today at the Great Yorkshire Show	Co-presenter	Channel 5 series
2022	Alan Carr's Epic Gameshow	Contestant	Series 3, Episode 6
2022	Riddiculous	Host	ITV quiz show
2023	Scam Britain: How to Stay Safe	Presenter	Tonight Series 25, Episode 18
2024	Jason Atherton’s Dubai Dishes	Co-presenter	Series 2
2026	The Box	Contestant	ITV game show
