= Laura Tobin =

English weather presenter

Laura Tobin FRMetS
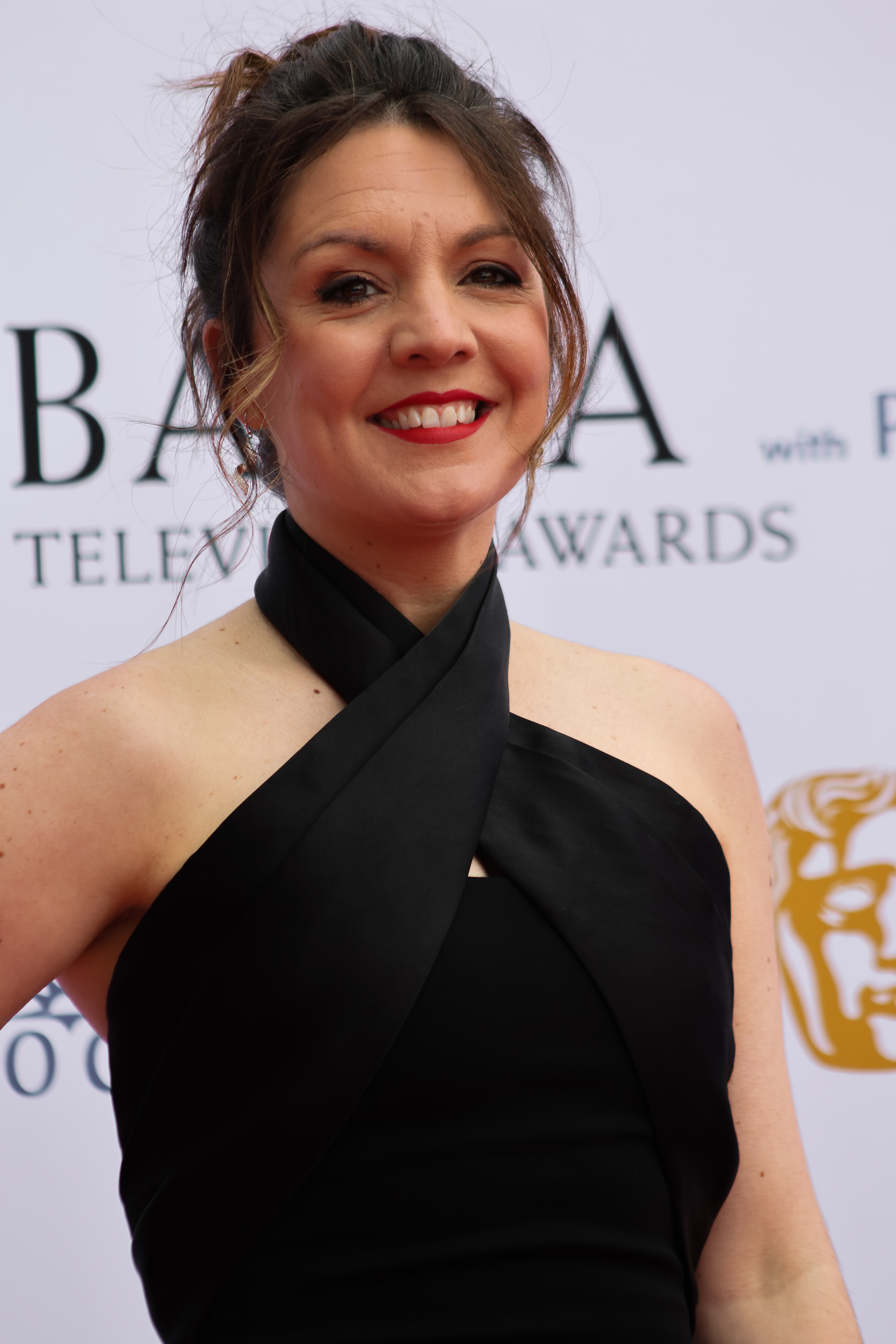
- Tobin at the BAFTA Television Awards 2026
- Born: Laura Elizabeth Tobin; 10 October 1981 (age 45); Northampton, Northamptonshire, England
- Education: University of Reading
- Occupation: Meteorologist
- Years active: 2007–present
- Employers: BBC (2007–2012); ITV (2012–present)
- Spouse: Dean Brown (m. 2010)
- Children: 1

Laura Elizabeth Tobin (born 10 October 1982) is an English broadcast meteorologist and scientist. She worked for the BBC before moving to the ITV Breakfast programme Daybreak in 2012. Daybreak was later replaced by Good Morning Britain in early 2014. Tobin currently presents the weather bulletins for the programme.

== Early life and education ==
Tobin was born and raised in Northampton. She attended Duston Upper School, gaining A-Levels in mathematics, physics and art. Thereafter, she obtained a degree in physics and meteorology at the University of Reading, graduating in 2003. Tobin also completed a World Meteorological Organization course on climate.

== Career ==
After graduation in 2003, she joined the Met Office. On completing her training, she was assigned in October 2004 to the Cardiff Weather Centre, where she gained experience of broadcasting on BBC Radio Wales. In 2005, Tobin moved to RAF Brize Norton, providing aeronautical meteorology reports and briefings to Royal Air Force transport crews and to the British Forces Broadcasting Service (BFBS).

Tobin joined the team of BBC Weather Centre forecasters at the end of 2007, eventually regularly appearing on the BBC News channel, BBC World News, BBC Radio 5 Live and the on-demand interactive services of BBC Red Button found on digital terrestrial and digital satellite TV. She also regularly presented the weather for the BBC News at One on the BBC.

On 3 September 2012, she joined the newly relaunched breakfast programme Daybreak as the weather presenter. On 18 July 2013, she appeared on BBC Radio 1's Innuendo Bingo. In April 2014, Daybreak was replaced by Good Morning Britain. Her first show was on 28 April 2014. She continues to front the weather updates on the programme. In November 2015, she was a contestant on a celebrity episode of The Chase. In 2016, she took part in the celebrity driving show Drive, hosted by Vernon Kay.

In February 2017, Tobin broke the Guinness World Record for filling and folding 11 pancakes in 60 seconds.

In 2018, Tobin joined 26 other celebrities and performed an original Christmas song called "Rock With Rudolph", written and produced by Grahame and Jack Corbyn. The song was recorded in aid of Great Ormond Street Hospital and was released digitally by the independent record label Saga Entertainment on 30 November 2018 under the artist name the Celebs. In 2020, during the COVID-19 crisis, Tobin rejoined the Celebs and sang the opening lyrics on the charity Christmas song called "Merry Christmas Everyone", which was released digitally on 11 December 2020 by Saga Entertainment. She performed with 31 other celebrities on the song to raise money for the Alzheimer's Society and Action for Children charities.

On 28 January 2021, Tobin reported for ITV's Tonight programme.

On 14 March 2022, Laura Tobin appeared on Polsat.

Tobin believes in educating climate deniers about the science of climate change rather than ignoring or confronting them. "Unlike many who face abuse and complaints on Twitter, Tobin makes a point of replying to climate deniers and even replies to their tweets live on air, answering their questions."

== Awards ==
In 2015, she was nominated for a TRIC Award in the "Weather Presenter" category, but lost out to Carol Kirkwood. She was nominated for the same award in 2017.

In 2021, Tobin was awarded the Fellowship of the Royal Meteorological Society, "In recognition of substantial contributions to meteorology in professional work".

== Personal life ==
Laura Tobin's husband is Dean Brown. The couple got married on August 13, 2010, after meeting during their student days at the University of Reading. She gave birth to their first child, a daughter named Charlotte, in July 2017. Tobin has a twin brother called Mark.

== Filmography ==
Television

| Year | Program | Role | Notes |
|---|---|---|---|
| 2007–2012 | BBC Weather | Weather presenter | |
| 2012–2014 | Daybreak | Weather presenter | |
| 2014— | Good Morning Britain | Lead weather presenter | |
| 2015, 2022 | The Chase: Celebrity Special | Contestant | 1 episode |
| 2016 | Drive | Contestant | 1 episode |
| 2017 | Pointless Celebrities | Contestant | 1 episode |
| 2020 | Tipping Point: Lucky Stars | Contestant | 1 episode |
| 2021 | Tonight | Reporter | Episode: "Going Green: Save Money?" |
| 2021 | Celebrity Mastermind | Contestant | Specialist subject: Bon Jovi |
| 2022 | Tonight | Meteorological expert | Episode: Heatwave Britain: How Hot Will It Get? |
| 2022 | Celebrity Lingo | Contestant | With Andi Peters |
| 2023 | James Martin's Saturday Morning | Guest | Saturday 21 January |
| 2023 | Britain Get Singing | Contestant | One episode |
| 2024 | Richard Osman's House of Games | Contestant | Five Episodes |

Film

| Year | Title | Role | Notes |
|---|---|---|---|
| 2017 | Sharknado 5: Global Swarming | Herself | Cameo role |
| 2018 | "Rock With Rudolph" | Herself | Music Video |
| 2020 | "Merry Christmas Everyone" | Herself | Music Video |
| 2023 | "So Delicious" | Herself | Music Video |

=== Books ===
- Tobin, Laura (2022). Everyday Ways to Save Our Planet. London: Mirror Books. ISBN 9781913406738.
- Tobin, Laura (2026). Come Rain or Shine. London: New River Books. ISBN 9781915780942.
