= Lucy Watson (journalist) =

English journalist and newsreader

- Born: Lucy Watson; Wirral, England
- Occupation: Journalist
- Employer: ITN (2007–present)
- Website: ITV Page

Lucy Watson is an English journalist and newsreader, who was employed by ITN for ITV News as a general news correspondent.

== Career history ==
Watson left Daybreak to join ITN in February 2014 under the title of China Correspondent for ITV News based in Beijing.

In a report covering the conflict in Ukraine, she commented that "Now the unthinkable has happened to them. This is not a developing third world nation. This is Europe." This was criticised as offensive.
