= Good Morning Britain =

Breakfast television

- Genre: Breakfast television; News and current affairs
- Directed by: Sam Gunnion
- Presented by: Susanna Reid; Kate Garraway; Ranvir Singh; Richard Madeley; Ed Balls
- Theme music composer: Henry Gorman; Simon Hill; Rob May
- Country of origin: United Kingdom
- Original language: English

Production
- Production locations: Studio 5, The London Studios (2014–18); Studio TC3, Television Centre (2018–2025); Studio 1, ITN headquarters (2026–)
- Editor: Neil Thompson
- Running time: 150 minutes (2014–2020); 180 minutes (2020–2025); 210 minutes (2026–) (inc. adverts)
- Production companies: ITV Studios Daytime (2014–2025); ITN (2026–)

Original release
- Network: ITV
- Release: 28 April 2014 – present

Related
- Daybreak (2010–14); ITV News Lorraine

Good Morning Britain (often abbreviated to GMB) is a British breakfast television programme that is broadcast on ITV. It first aired on 28 April 2014 and is broadcast live every weekday from 6:00 am to 9:30 am across the United Kingdom. The programme features a wide variety of news, interviews, politics, sport, entertainment, competitions and weather as well as local news bulletins delivered by the ITV regions. The programme is currently presented by Susanna Reid, Kate Garraway, Ranvir Singh, Richard Madeley and Ed Balls.

== Format ==
The magazine-style show includes headline updates at the beginning of the programme and at the top of each hour thereafter, then three short three-minute regional bulletins at quarter past the hour featuring news, travel/transit advisories, and weather. From 6 January 2020, the first half-hour features Hawkins, Garraway or Singh reading the day's headlines, joined at 6:30 am by two of the main anchors, and although this format was suspended during the early part of the COVID-19 pandemic in the United Kingdom, it later returned on 31 August 2020. The show features interviews with celebrities and politicians as well as discussion of topical issues, with a reputation for often heated debates. Viewers are encouraged to engage with the show through digital platforms such as Facebook and Twitter, and there are regular competitions that the audience can enter, usually presented by Andi Peters.

Weather bulletins are presented by Laura Tobin, with entertainment and health being presented by Richard Arnold and Dr Hilary Jones, respectively.

== History ==
A programme of the same name aired as part of TV-am between 1983 and 1992 each weekday between 7:00 am and 9:00 am, alongside a Saturday morning edition.

=== 2014–2015 ===
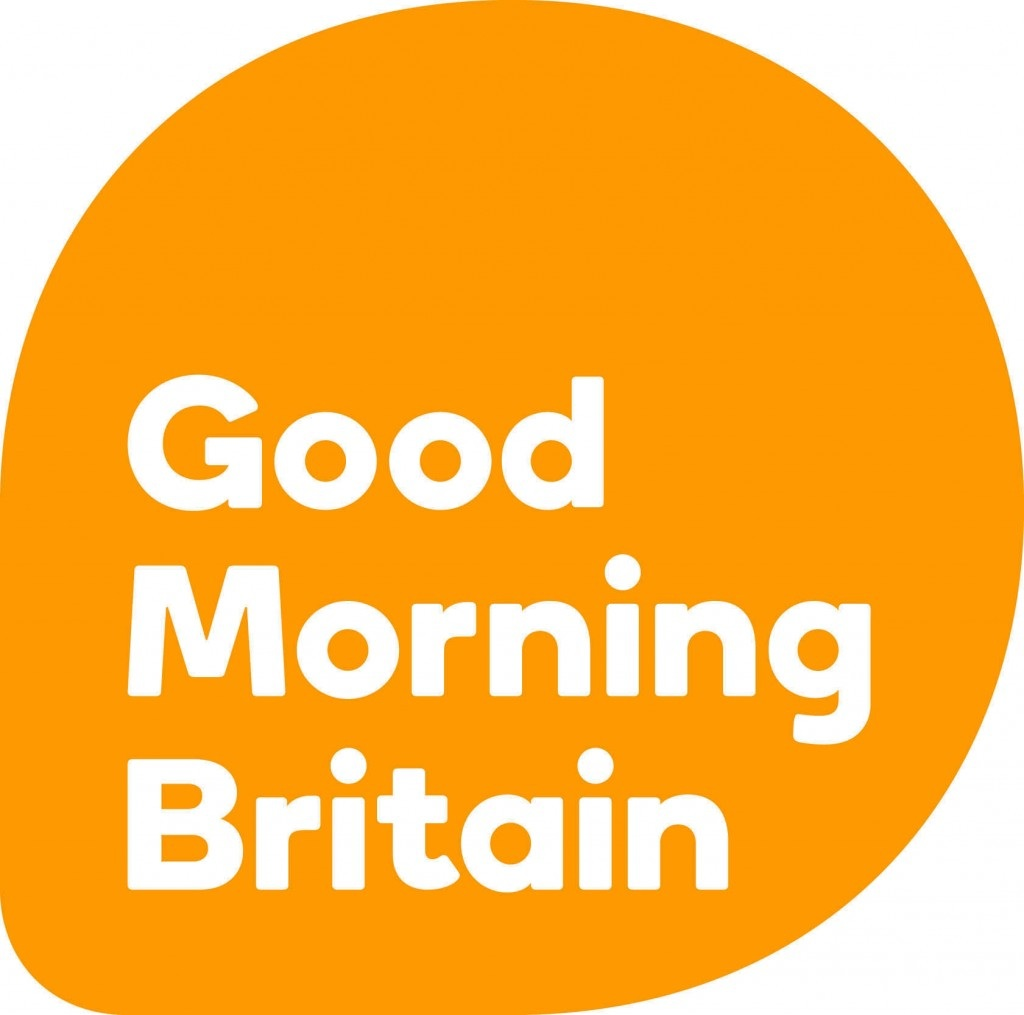
Logo used from 2014 to 2017

Good Morning Britain launched on 28 April 2014 following the cancellation of Daybreak with four main presenters – Susanna Reid, Ben Shephard, Charlotte Hawkins and Sean Fletcher, with weather bulletins presented by Laura Tobin, entertainment news delivered by Richard Arnold and sports news presented by Fletcher.

The programme was directed by Erron Gordon from its inception in 2014 to 2021. Stuart Earl took over as director following Erron's departure in 2021.

Reid, Shephard and Hawkins all presented four days a week, with Fletcher presenting every day. When Reid was absent, Hawkins took her place and was in turn, substituted by Kate Garraway or Ranvir Singh.

Between 13 June and 11 July, the show reported on the 2014 FIFA World Cup, with Fletcher presenting highlights and reactions live from Brazil. They also utilised graphics and music adapted specifically for the event.

On 19 September 2014, the show was extended to 10:00 am to provide coverage on the 2014 Scottish independence referendum, with Reid and Shephard presenting live from Edinburgh.

On 24 July 2015, the show was presented live from Buckingham Palace by Shephard, Garraway and Tobin.

On 13 October 2015, ITV announced that Piers Morgan would join the programme three days a week as a permanent presenter following a week as a guest presenter in April.

=== 2016–2017 ===
On 22 March 2016, the show was extended to 10:30 am to cover the breaking news of the Brussels bombings, meaning that sister show Lorraine and The Jeremy Kyle Show were cancelled. The following day, Reid presented coverage of the aftermath live from Brussels, while Morgan and Hawkins presented from the studio.

On 25 March 2016, a fire occurred in an ITV production office, causing the presenters and crew to evacuate shortly before the programme went on air. A standby tape was played as a substitute for the first 30 minutes of the programme and Dinner Date was then shown for the remainder of Good Morning Britain's airtime.

On 24 June 2016, the show was extended to 9:25 am to cover the result of the United Kingdom European Union membership referendum.

On 22 July 2016, a second royal special was broadcast live from Buckingham Palace with Garraway and Singh. Laura Tobin presented the weather live from the Palace Gardens.

On 9 November, the show was extended to 9:25 am again to cover the results of the 2016 United States presidential election, with Reid and Morgan live in New York City, Singh in Washington, D.C., and Hawkins in the studio.

On 26 January 2017, newsreader and relief presenter Ranvir Singh was announced as the programme's new Political Editor.

On 20 March 2017, a new look was launched featuring an updated logo, music and graphics.

=== 2018–2019 ===
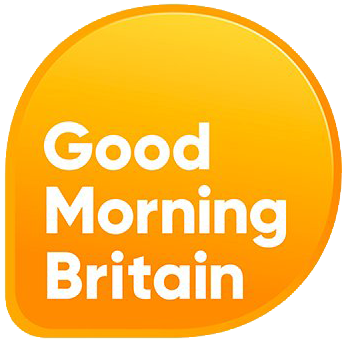
Logo used from 2017 to 2025

On 26 January 2018, a special edition of the programme was broadcast, focused on a worldwide exclusive interview with US President Donald Trump. Shephard and Garraway presented the majority of the programme from the studio in London, while Morgan presented parts of the show live from Davos, Switzerland.

On 13 April 2018, the final edition of Good Morning Britain from The London Studios was broadcast. Morgan and Reid returned on 16 April, broadcasting live from Television Centre for the first time, with a new studio and updated opening titles.

On 18 May 2018, Garraway and Shephard presented a special edition of the programme in celebration of the wedding of Prince Harry and Meghan Markle, with Hawkins and Tobin presenting live from Windsor.

On 28 June 2018, ITV aired a special edition of the programme entitled Good Evening Britain following the England vs. Belgium World Cup football match, with live reactions, debates and analysis, presented by Morgan and Reid. Guests included Pamela Anderson, David Ginola, Danny Dyer and Jeremy Corbyn.

On 24 September 2018, the show began airing in the United States, on the BritBox streaming service. The version seen on BritBox, is a specially edited version featuring the highlights of that day's edition. It is available at 7:00 am ET.

On 13 December 2018, Reid presented parts of the show live from Westminster following Theresa May's survival in a vote of no confidence, with Shephard and Garraway presenting in the studio.

=== 2020 ===
On 6 January 2020, ITV Daytime announced that Good Morning Britain would be broadcast for an additional half an hour, with a new finishing time of 9:00 am, owing to the cancellation of The Jeremy Kyle Show. The first half-hour features Hawkins, Garraway or Singh reading the day's main headlines, joined at 6:30 am by the main anchors. The show received updated titles that were reverted during the COVID-19 pandemic, featuring the presenters' names.

On 21 January 2020, the show was accused of racism and received more than 1,500 Ofcom complaints after Morgan made comments relating to a Chinese dairy advert, in which he said, "He's using ching chang chong milk". Morgan also spoke over the advert saying, "ching chang cho jo". He was accused by some viewers as using racist language that is used to antagonise Chinese people, and for mocking the Chinese language. Both Morgan and Good Morning Britain denied the accusations. This led to several public figures including footballer John Barnes and politician Sarah Owen, separately criticising both Morgan and the show for ignoring racism. The episode was later taken down from the ITV Hub on the day it aired, although ITV claimed it was removed for "a totally unrelated reason".

On 17 March 2020, Reid was forced to self-isolate at home after one of her children displayed symptoms of COVID-19, which, under government guidelines at the time, required the whole household to self-isolate. Reid continued to make appearances on the programme via video link, and returned to the studio on 31 March.

On 22 March 2020, in response to the COVID-19 pandemic in the United Kingdom, ITV announced that production of both Lorraine and Loose Women would be suspended owing to the lower number of production staff able to work. As a result, Good Morning Britain was extended by an hour to finish at the later time of 10:00 am, with the final hour co‑hosted by Morgan and Lorraine Kelly. From April 2020, however, Kelly hosted the final hour on her own, with regular input from health editor Hilary Jones.

From 4 May 2020, Morgan was absent from the programme all week, displaying COVID-19 symptoms. Shephard instead co-hosted alongside Reid. He returned on 11 May 2020.

On 8 July 2020, Morgan and Reid announced they would be taking an extended break of six weeks over the summer, with Shephard, Ray, Hawkins, Singh and Garraway (who had been absent from the show owing to her husband Derek Draper being admitted to intensive care with COVID-19) presenting in their place. Morgan and Reid returned on Tuesday 1 September.

On 12 July 2020, it was announced that Lorraine would start production again, meaning that Kelly would no longer present the final hour of Good Morning Britain, and the show would subsequently return to its previous finish time of 9:00 am.

On 13 and 14 August 2020, Sean Fletcher returned to present two editions of the programme (for the first time since March) with Charlotte Hawkins, and on 20 and 21 August, Alex Beresford co-hosted two episodes alongside Kate Garraway.

On 31 August 2020, the format from January–March 2020 was returned, with Morgan and Reid (from 6:30 am) and Hawkins (from 6:00 am) all in the studio together for the first time in 6 months.

During the week beginning on 2 November 2020, Morgan and Reid presented the show for the whole week because of the 2020 United States presidential election, including a results programme on Wednesday 4 November, as well as the second lockdown in England owing to the COVID-19 pandemic.

=== 2021 ===
On 20 January 2021, Hawkins was forced to isolate for 10 days, starting the following day. Sean Fletcher covered her absence. She returned on 1 February 2021.

On 3 February 2021, Morgan and Reid hosted a special edition of the programme in memory of Captain Sir Tom Moore who died the day before from pneumonia and COVID-19.

On 8 March 2021, the programme came under fire for remarks made by Morgan following the US broadcast of the Oprah with Meghan and Harry interview. In the interview, Meghan, Duchess of Sussex stated that there were periods of time that she "didn't want to be alive anymore". Morgan did not believe this, stating "I don't believe a word she says, Meghan Markle. I wouldn't believe her if she read me a weather report."

On 9 March, the morning after the UK airing of the interview, Morgan walked off the show, following weather presenter Alex Beresford's alternative narrative for Morgan's behaviour. An Ofcom investigation was also announced the same day, for a potential breach of their harm and offence rules. It had received 57,121 complaints as of 17 March 2021, making it the most complained about programme since the formation of Ofcom in 2003.

Later the same day, it was announced by ITV plc that Morgan had "decided it was the time to leave" Good Morning Britain and would be doing so immediately. Morgan stated the following day that he had "had time to reflect" on his comments on the programme and still didn't believe what Meghan had said, citing his right to "freedom of speech".

In June 2021, Shephard suffered a major injury that forced him to have emergency leg surgery the following month. After three weeks of recovery, he was declared fit to return to his presenting duties.

On 13 and 27 September 2021, new graphics and titles were launched incorporating the "blocks" on the screens in the studio.

On 25 November 2021, series director Erron Gordon left the programme to join TalkTV. He was replaced by stand-in director Stuart Earl.

On 19 December 2021, ITV confirmed that, in an effort to keep presenters and staff safe amidst growing concern about the Omicron variant, Good Morning Britain was extended by an hour to finish at the later time of 10:00 am, with the final hour hosted by Andi Peters (stand in for Lorraine Kelly) and titled Good Morning Britain with Lorraine.

On 20 December 2021, ITV confirmed that the programme will go on hiatus after the Christmas period as a result of rapid increase in the COVID-19 cases.

=== 2022 ===
From January 2022, the format to the show changed between 6:00 am and 7:00 am. The two main presenters start at 6:00 am (previously 6:30 am) and present the main story and then the day's newsreader (who used to present solely from 6:00 am to 6:30 am) presents the rest of the day's news. Following the weather forecast and an overview of the local news, the morning's papers are then reviewed by guests.

Good Morning Britain aired two special episodes on Saturday 10 and Sunday 11 September 2022, in reflection of the death of Queen Elizabeth II.

=== 2023 ===
On 6 May 2023, Reid and Shephard presented a special Saturday edition of the show to mark the build up to the coronation of King Charles, live from Westminster Abbey. Garraway, Hawkins and Singh all acted as reporters on location.

On 4 September 2023, GMB received a slight refresh with its on screen graphics. The opening titles and music remained as before. The 2017 GMB logo no longer features as part of the on screen graphics, but was still used on the overall branding of the programme until the end of 2025.

=== 2024 ===
On 16 February 2024, it was announced that Ben Shephard would be leaving Good Morning Britain in March to become the permanent presenter on This Morning.

=== 2025 ===
In May 2025, it was announced that as part of a reorganization of ITV Breakfast to take effect in January 2026, production duties for Good Morning Britain will be brought under the ITV News division within ITN. On 31 December 2025, the final edition of Good Morning Britain from Television Centre was broadcast.

=== 2026 ===
On 5 January 2026, Good Morning Britain moved to the ITN headquarters, while Lorraine, This Morning and Loose Women would all move to The H Club Studio. The programme relaunched with a new set (shared with ITV News bulletins and ITV News London) and using the 2023 GMB logo as a main logo, with the remaining of the opening titles, music and graphics from before.

On 9 March 2026, a fire alarm went off 20 minutes before it was supposed to end, meaning that This Morning went on early at 9:40am.

== Studio ==
=== 2014–2018 ===
Good Morning Britain was broadcast from Studio 5 at The London Studios, the same studio where GMTV was broadcast from during its seventeen-year run. In February 2017, it was announced that The London Studios, where Good Morning Britain is broadcast, would be closed for some years beginning in 2018, as ITV decided to demolish the building and have it rebuilt. It was also announced that ITV's daytime shows, including Good Morning Britain, Lorraine, This Morning and Loose Women, would be moving to studio space at BBC Studioworks' Television Centre, previously used by the BBC before moving in March 2013. The last programme from The London Studios was broadcast on 13 April 2018.

=== 2018–2025 ===
ITV's daytime shows moved to Television Centre on 16 April 2018, with Good Morning Britain using Studio TC3. This 6,390 sq ft (594 m^{2}) studio is split in two, with half of it being used for Good Morning Britain and half for This Morning. They share the same cameras and gallery. In October 2018, it was announced that ITV would not be returning to the South Bank.

=== 2026–present ===
From 5 January 2026, Good Morning Britain would be produced by ITN, under the ITV News banner. It comes as part of the renewed agreement with ITN to produce national, international, London and digital news for ITV for the next five years. It also sees ITV conduct a wider review of its daytime scheduling and production to find cost savings and efficiencies. The programme would be broadcast from Studio 1 at ITN's Central London headquarters on Gray's Inn Road, shared with the ITV News bulletins and ITV News London. The programme would also be extended to run from 6:00 am to 10:00 am daily for 22 weeks of the year, and 6:00 am to 9:30 am for 30 weeks of the year, continuing to be available on ITVX after broadcast.

== GMB Today ==
GMB Today was a temporary replacement for Lorraine while it was on summer break. Broadcast 21 August to 1 September 2017.

GMB Today
Date	Presenter
21 August 2017	Jeremy Kyle; Kate Garraway
22 August 2017	Jeremy Kyle; Kate Garraway
23 August 2017	Jeremy Kyle; Kate Garraway
24 August 2017	Richard Madeley; Kate Garraway
25 August 2017	Richard Madeley; Charlotte Hawkins
28 August 2017	Richard Madeley; Ranvir Singh
29 August 2017	Richard Madeley; Ranvir Singh
30 August 2017	Richard Madeley; Ranvir Singh; Charlotte Hawkins
31 August 2017	Eamonn Holmes; Ranvir Singh
1 September 2017	Eamonn Holmes; Ranvir Singh

== Reception ==
Good Morning Britain competes with BBC Breakfast, Sky News Breakfast and GB News Breakfast in the early morning TV timeslot.

=== Accolades ===
Good Morning Britain was nominated for three TRIC Awards in 2015. Susanna Reid was awarded Newscaster of the Year.

"Newscast Studio" named the programme's set as Best International Set of the Year 2015.

Good Morning Britain was nominated in the 2016 TV Choice Awards for the Best Daytime TV Programme but failed to win.

Good Morning Britain jointly won the PinkNews Broadcaster of the Year Award with Victoria Derbyshire in 2016.

The programme was nominated for a National Television Award in 2018, but failed to make the shortlist. It did, however, make the shortlist in 2019, 2020 and 2021.

Presenters Piers Morgan and Ben Shephard were both nominated for the Best Presenter award at the 2019, 2020 and 2021 National Television Awards; however, both failed to make the shortlist in 2019 & 2020, but six months after leaving the show, Morgan was shortlisted for the award, but lost to Ant & Dec.

In 2019, they received two BAFTA TV nominations for Best News Coverage for their knife crime interview and Thomas Markle exclusive interview, but failed to win.

On 18 June 2019, the programme won The Golden Nymph for Best Live Breaking News at the 59th Monte-Carlo Television Festival.
