= Travers Humphreys =

British barrister (1867–1956)

The Right Honourable Sir Travers Humphreys
- Travers Humphreys in about 1928

Judge of His Majesty's High Court of Justice
- In office 18 February 1928 – 1 October 1951

Personal details
- Born: 4 August 1867 Bloomsbury, England
- Died: 20 February 1956 (aged 88) South Kensington, England
- Spouse: Zoë Marguerite Neumans
- Children: Richard Grain Humphreys (1897–1917); Travers Christmas Humphreys (1901–83)
- Education: Trinity Hall, Cambridge

Sir Richard Somers Travers Christmas Humphreys (4 August 1867 – 20 February 1956) was a British barrister who was involved in the cases of Oscar Wilde and the murderers Hawley Harvey Crippen, George Joseph Smith and John George Haigh, the 'Acid Bath Murderer', among many others.

== Early life and career ==
Travers Humphreys was born in Doughty Street in Bloomsbury in London, the fourth son and sixth child of solicitor Charles Octavius Humphreys, and his wife, Harriet Ann (née Grain), the sister of the entertainer Richard Corney Grain. Humphreys was educated at Shrewsbury School and at Trinity Hall, Cambridge, graduating BA in 1889. He was called to the Bar from the Inner Temple in 1889 and entered the chambers of Edward Thomas Edmonds Besley (1826-1901), where he concentrated on practice in the criminal courts.

Humphreys soon after being called to the Bar c.1890

On 1 March 1895 Oscar Wilde, Lord Alfred Douglas and Robbie Ross approached Charles Octavius Humphreys with the intention of suing the Marquess of Queensberry, Douglas' father, for criminal libel. Humphreys applied for a warrant for Queensberry's arrest and approached Sir Edward Clarke and Charles Willie Mathews to represent Wilde. Travers Humphreys appeared as a Junior Counsel for the prosecution in the subsequent case of Wilde vs Queensbury.

On 28 May 1896 Humphreys married the actress Zoë Marguerite (1872–1953), the daughter of Henri Philippe Neumans, an artist from Antwerp. In 1895 she had appeared in An Artist's Model with Marie Tempest, Marie Studholme, Letty Lind and Hayden Coffin. They had two sons, the elder of whom, Richard Grain Humphreys (1897-28 September 1917) was killed in France in the Third Battle of Ypres during World War I; the younger son was the noted barrister and judge Christmas Humphreys, who prosecuted Ruth Ellis for the murder of her lover David Blakely in 1955.

In 1902 Humphreys held a junior brief under H. F. Dickens KC for the defence of Emma 'Kitty' Byron, who was charged with the murder of Arthur Reginald Baker. Although Byron was convicted, Dickens's defence was so spirited that she was given a reduced prison sentence due to public petition.

Humphreys was appointed Counsel for the Crown at the Middlesex and North London sessions in 1905, a junior Treasury Counsel (or 'Treasury Devil') to the Crown at the Central Criminal Court in 1908, and was appointed one of three senior Treasury Counsel in 1916.

In 1910 Humphreys appeared as Junior Counsel in the prosecution of H. H. Crippen for the murder of his wife, Cora Henrietta Crippen; and in 1912 he appeared for the prosecution against Frederick Seddon, who was found guilty of poisoning Eliza Mary Barrow. He appeared for the prosecution at the Old Bailey in 1915 with Archibald Bodkin (later Director of Public Prosecutions) and Cecil Whiteley (later KC) against George Joseph Smith, the 'Brides in the Bath' murderer.

In 1916 he was one of the team who prosecuted Sir Roger Casement for treason. At the Central Criminal Court in 1922 he successfully prosecuted Horatio Bottomley for fraudulent conversion. Also in 1922 he appeared for the Crown, led by the Solicitor-General Sir Thomas Inskip, against Edith Thompson and Frederick Bywaters, who were jointly charged with the murder of Thompson's husband.

== Judicial career ==
Humphreys was knighted in the 1925 Birthday Honours. After appointments as Recorder of Chichester, Recorder of Cambridge and Deputy Chairman of London Sessions in 1926, Humphries was made a judge of the King's Bench Division in 1928. Although Humphreys had a long career at the Bar, it was unusual for someone whose experience was confined to criminal work to be appointed a High Court judge. His attitude while on the bench seemed fierce and intimidating, although Humphreys was popular among legal colleagues and in private was said to be witty.

In 1927 he prosecuted Browne and Kennedy for their murder of PC Gutteridge.

During the 1940s and early 1950s Humphreys sat in the Court of Criminal Appeal. After World War II, he sat in this capacity with Lord Chief Justice Lord Goddard and Mr Justice Lynksey to hear William Joyce's appeal against his conviction for treason during the war. The court rejected Joyce's appeal. He also presided at the brief treason trial of John Amery, a British fascist who had set up the British Free Corps, a small wartime unit of British volunteers serving in the German Waffen SS. During the eight-minute trial, Amery was sentenced to death after pleading guilty, although Humphreys only accepted the guilty plea after making sure Amery was fully aware a death sentence would be the inevitable outcome of this.

In 1949, Humphreys presided over the trial of John George Haigh, the Acid Bath Murderer, whom he sentenced to death. In 1950, he sat with the Lord Chief Justice Lord Goddard and Mr Justice Sellers in the Court of Criminal Appeal to hear the appeal of Timothy Evans against his conviction for the murder of his baby daughter, evidence having also been admitted as to the death of Evans' wife.

== Later years ==
He was appointed a Knight Bachelor in 1925 and a Privy Counsellor in 1946. He retired in 1951 as the senior and oldest King's Bench judge. He was a member of the Garrick Club and was a keen yachtsman On his wife's death in 1953 Humphreys sold his Ealing home and moved into the Onslow Court Hotel, in Queen's Gate, South Kensington, which specialised in providing accommodation for retired people. Coincidentally, this was the hotel occupied about four years before by serial killer John George Haigh and his last victim Mrs Durand-Deacon.

== Media portrayals ==
Humphreys was played by Ian Connaughton in the 2003 TV drama The Brides in the Bath; by Frederick Hall in The Edwardians episode "Horatio Bottomley" (1972); by Raymond Huntley in the On Trial episode "Horatio Bottomley, MP" (1960); and by John Barron in the 1960 episode "Sir Roger Casement" in the same series.

In 1955 Humphreys appeared in Murder Anonymous, an episode in the long-running Scotland Yard series of short films, being interviewed by the host Edgar Lustgarten. Humphreys speaks for several minutes at the start of the episode and then again near the end. The film was released in November 1955, three months before his death.

== Works ==
- A Book of Trials, William Heinemann (1953)
- Criminal Days, Hodder & Stoughton (1946)
