= List of ITV Breakfast programmes =

The following details are for the programmes that ITV Breakfast currently broadcasts.

ITV Breakfast is the breakfast television franchise for the UK's ITV network. It began broadcasting on 6 September 2010 as the replacement for GMTV Limited.

== Good Morning Britain ==
Good Morning Britain is the weekday breakfast television programme on the British commercial ITV network that broadcasts on weekday mornings from 06:00 to 08:30 (2014 - 2020), 06:00 to 09:00 (2020 - 2025), 06:00 to 09:30/10:00 (2026 - present) and is presented by Susanna Reid, Ed Balls, Kate Garraway, Richard Madeley and Ranvir Singh. It features news and entertainment stories interspersed with celebrity interviews, competitions, consumer and health items and news reports from the regions. Piers Morgan was a presenter until 2021. Ben Shephard was a presenter until 2024.

== Lorraine ==
Lorraine is the early weekday morning, lifestyle and entertainment show for the British ITV network, presented by Lorraine Kelly. ITV Breakfast produces Lorraine, which airs every weekday from 09:30 until 10:00 for 30 weeks of the year, following Good Morning Britain. The programme replaced Kelly's previous show, GMTV with Lorraine. Since the programme's timeslot was cut from one hour to 30 minutes from January 2026, the programme no longer broadcasts during the ITV Breakfast slot, which ends at 09:25.

== CITV ==
CITV was broadcast each weekend on ITV Breakfast on weekends originally from 06:00-09:25. In the summer holidays, it was usually cut back to 8.25am. The CITV simulcast came to an end in August 2023, when kids programmes were moved to ITVX and ITV2. Daytime repeats are now broadcast during the earlier hours of the ITV Breakfast slot at weekends.

== Weekends ==
Tenure(s)	Show	Saturday	Sunday
2014–2017	Weekend	✓	✓
2018	Zoe Ball on...Saturday/Sunday	✓	✓
2019	The Sara Cox Show	✓	✓
2020	Martin & Roman's Sunday Best!	✗	✓
2021	Martin & Roman's Weekend Best!	✓	✓
2022	ITV News: Weekend Morning	✓	✓
2022	Garraway's Good Stuff	✓	✗
2022	Big Zuu's Breakfast Show	✗	✓
2022	Vick Hope's Breakfast Show	✗	✓
2022–2024	Katie Piper's Breakfast Show	✗	✓
2023	Oti Mabuse's Breakfast Show	✓	✗
2023	Laura Whitmore's Breakfast Show	✗	✓
2024–present	Prue Leith's Cotswold Kitchen	✓	✗
2024	The Chris McCausland Show	✓	✗
2024	Jimmy and Shivi's Farmhouse Breakfast	✗	✓
