= Kitty Byron =

British criminal convicted to life imprisonment

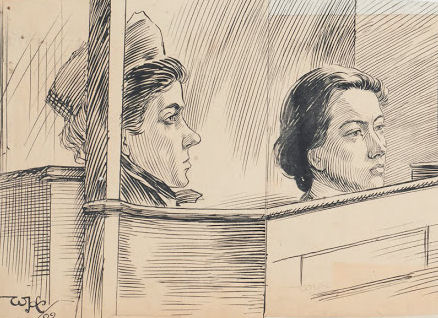
Kitty Byron (right) in the dock at the Old Bailey with a female wardress. Drawing by William Hartley (Crime Museum).

Emma "Kitty" Byron (1878 – after 1908) was a British murderer found guilty in 1902 of stabbing to death her lover Arthur Reginald Baker, for which crime she was sentenced to death. This was subsequently commuted to life imprisonment.

== Background ==
The daughter of a brewer, Byron came from a respectable family who originally lived in Pimlico, but after her father died, the family moved to Leytonstone, where, at the time of the murder, Byron's mother continued to live in a villa in Napier Road with her married son and his wife and their three children, as well as Byron's 14-year-old sister. In early 1902 "Kitty" Byron had been employed as a milliner's assistant at Mme. Timorey's Court dressmaking establishment in Old Burlington Street, but she was sacked because of her poor time keeping.

At the time of the murder Byron was unemployed and had lived for several weeks in lodgings with her lover Arthur Reginald Baker, a stockbroker, in the home of Madam Adrienne Liard (born 1841 in France), a widowed mantle maker at 18 Duke Street, Portland Place in London. Originally they had rented two rooms but after a few weeks they had difficulty paying for these and subsequently moved into a bed-sitting room at the same address.

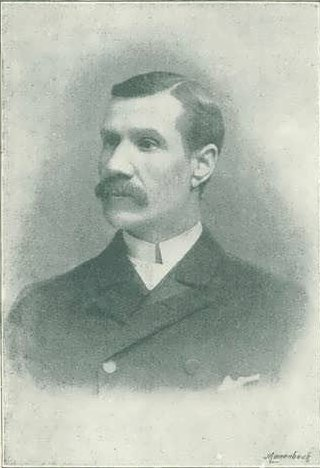
Detective Chief Inspector John Littlechild in 1893

Arthur Reginald Baker was born in Crawley in Sussex in 1857, the son of John Baker, a solicitor and partner in the firm of Baker, Blaker and Hoare of London. Baker married Alexandrina Mabel Turner (born 1861) in Marylebone in 1880. Their daughter Aileen Mabel Marguerite Baker was born in 1898; she died in 1969. Alexandrina was the step-daughter of Alderman Thomas Harrison, a former Mayor of Torquay from 1897 to 1898 and the owner of the Queen's Hotel in Torquay.

Baker had not lived with his wife since January 1902, and on 4 November 1902 he was served with a divorce petition from her in which Byron was named as co-respondent. The divorce papers were served on Baker by former Detective Chief Inspector John Littlechild, who had retired from the Metropolitan Police in 1893 and shifted to working as a private investigator.

Byron was described as "a young woman of attractive appearance – slight of figure, with dark eyebrows, black hair and handsome features." Although Baker was already married Byron called herself "Mrs Baker". Baker was an alcoholic, and he frequently argued with Byron and violently assaulted her.

== Murder of Baker ==
William Robert Coleman, who took the message from Byron to Arthur Baker (sketch by William Hartley from the Crime Museum).

At 7 p.m. on 7 November 1902 Baker and Byron were again fighting when Byron was forced to leave their rooms, appearing on the landing in her nightdress. Madam Liard reported at the subsequent trial that at that time Baker was drunk and Byron sober. The next day Madam Liard told the couple to leave her house. Baker told the landlady that Byron had agreed to leave if he could keep the room. Initially Madam Liard refused, but after some persuasion she agreed to allow Baker to stay for another week provided Byron left.

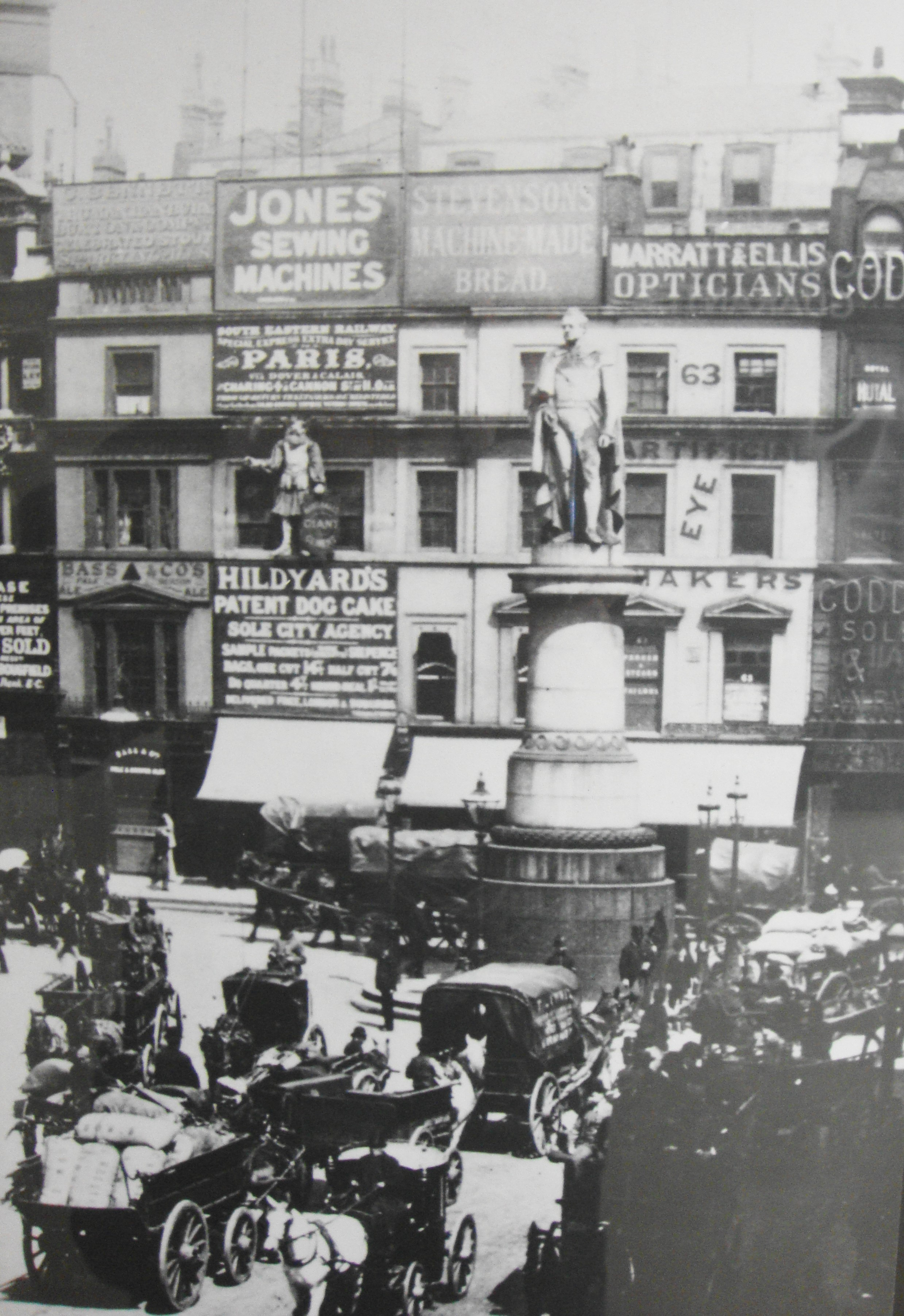
King William Street, the scene of the murder, c. 1890, photographed by Francis Frith

On the morning of 10 November 1902, the day of the Lord Mayor's Show, Byron bought a strong-bladed spring knife from a shop at 211, Oxford Street. At about 1 pm she sent an express letter by post office messenger from the Lombard Street Post Office to Baker at the Stock Exchange where he worked. The message said "Dear Reg, I want you a moment, importantly. Kitty." The messenger, 16-year old William Robert Coleman, returned stating he had been unable to deliver the letter, so Byron sent him back again.

This time Baker was found and went with the messenger to the post office in Lombard Street but Byron was not there. On her coming in a little later at about 2.30 p.m. she and Baker went out into King William Street where the two began a violent, furious argument. Witnesses related that Byron then pulled out the knife she had concealed in her muff and leapt off the steps of the post office at Baker, stabbing him three times. During the brief attack she severed his aorta, killing him instantly. When the police arrived they found Byron crouched sobbing over his body, crying out "Oh, Reggie, Reggie, let me kiss him!".

Byron was overpowered by several men who witnessed the attack, and Baker was taken in an ambulance to St Bartholomew's Hospital but died before reaching it. On arriving at Cloak Lane Police Station Byron said, "I killed him willingly, and he deserved it, and the sooner I am killed the better." Inspector Frederick Fox of the City of London Police stated that Byron later said, "Inspector, I wish to say something to you; I bought the knife to hit him but I did not know I was killing him."

Baker was buried at Norwood Cemetery on 14 November 1902.

== Trial ==
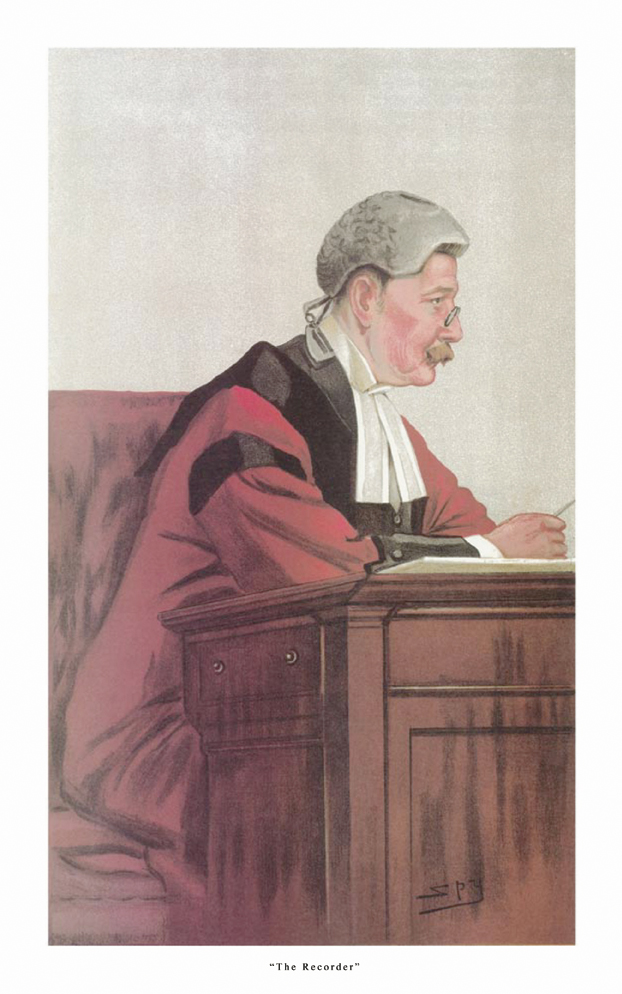
Sir Forrest Fulton by 'Spy' in Vanity Fair (1903)

Her trial began on 15 December 1902 at the Old Bailey before Sir Forrest Fulton, the Recorder of London. The courtroom was packed with spectators, many of them stockbrokers who had come to see Byron.

"As the gaoler called "Kitty Byron", a slender, dark-eyed girl came timidly up the stairs, shrinking a little when she saw the dense throng about her. Then, looking around the court-room, she advanced composedly into the dock and leaned on the iron railing... The girl was very white, but when the gaoler asked her if she felt faint she shook her head. She gave him a grateful look, however, when he placed a chair for her in the corner of the dock. After sitting down she gazed steadily, oblivious of the curious spectators, at Inspector Fox, who entered the witness box to relate the story of her arrest.

Miss Byron is decidedly prepossessing in appearance. She wore a dark skirt and jacket, with a high linen collar, and a sailor hat of white straw. She was very neat, and her features, though somewhat thin, are attractive. She looks younger than her age, which is given on the charge sheet at twenty-three."

Byron was prosecuted by Charles Willie Mathews and Archibald Bodkin, and was defended by Henry Fielding Dickens KC, Travers Humphreys and Mr Boyd. Members of the Stock Exchange funded her defence. Despite the fact that the murder was premeditated in that Byron had bought a knife earlier in the day of the stabbing, and she was of a lower class than her married lover, she gained the sympathy of the press and the public because of the brutal and unfeeling treatment she had received at the hands of Baker, and so did not give evidence in her own defence. During the trial it was revealed that before moving in with Baker Byron had had romantic relationships with both men and women.

At the trial Madam Liard stated of that evening:

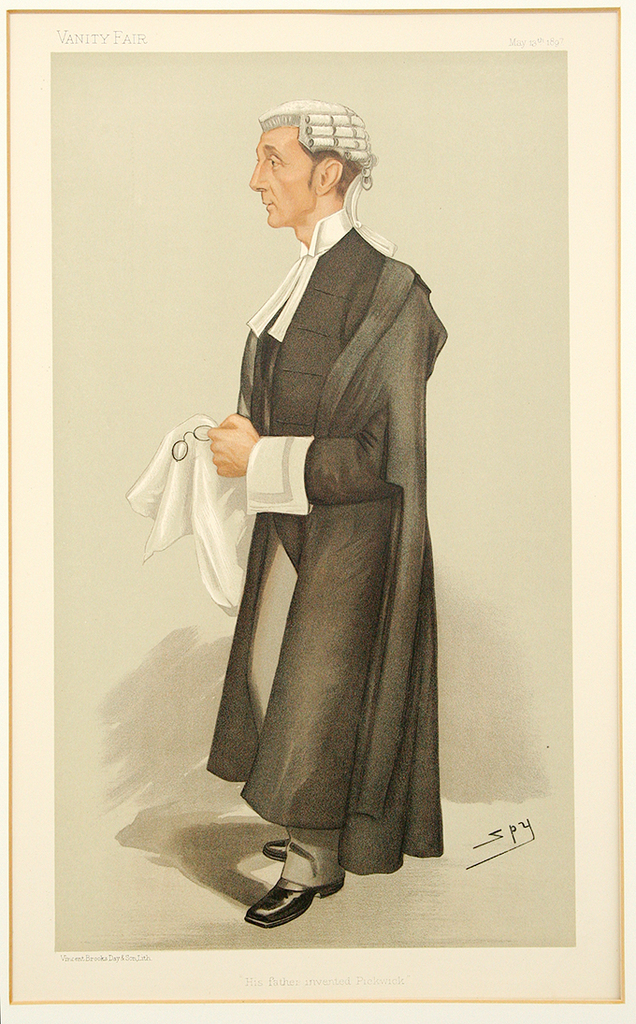
Henry Fielding Dickens KC by 'Spy' in Vanity Fair (1897)

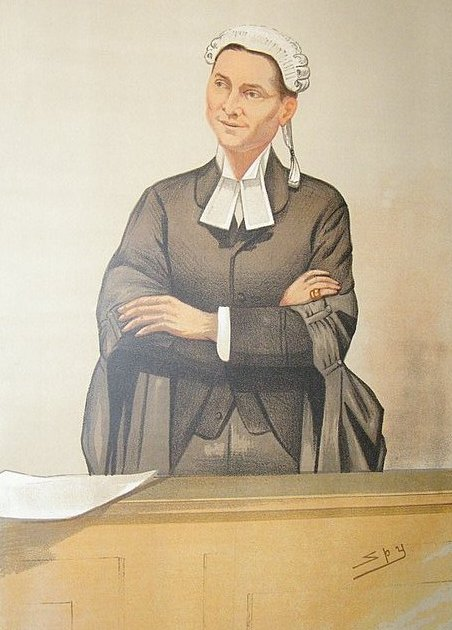
Charles Willie Mathews by 'Spy' in Vanity Fair (1892)

I am the landlady of 18, Duke Street, Portland Place. I let lodgings. The deceased came there by himself about July 21st; he occupied a room on the first floor. At first he paid £1 1s. per week. About a week afterwards, the prisoner came and occupied the room with him. She was not introduced to me, but when he took the room he said he wanted it for himself and his wife, who would be coming in a week. She was addressed as Mrs. Baker. In October the room was changed for a less expensive one. The deceased went out in the mornings. I do not know if he went to business; he did not go out every morning. The prisoner used to stop in the house a little later, and then go out. On the night of Friday, November 7th, there was some noise in their room. Next day I spoke to the prisoner about it, and the same day I gave the deceased notice to quit. On Monday, November 10th, he came to me and had some conversation with me, and later in the morning the prisoner came and said she wished to apologise for the noise they had made in the night; she said, "You have given us notice and we have got to go". I said, "Yes, you have got to go tomorrow Tuesday, but he will stop another week". The deceased had asked me if he might stop for another week, and I agreed to it. The prisoner said, "Well, next week you will hear something very dreadful". I said, "What is it?" and she said,'"Well, Madam, don't you tell him if I tell you, because he bangs me so." She then said there would be a divorce with him and his wife. I said, "As you are not his wife, why do you support all the ill-treatment he gives you?" She said, "I love him so". I said, "Why don't you go to work?" She said, "I lost my character, and I cannot get any work now; he used to come after me, and I lost the whole of my character." I told her the deceased had spoken to me, and I said to her, "He has just told me you are not his wife, and you are no class," and that she would go next morning to her sister's, and that he would stop another week with me. When I told her that, she said, "He wants to send me to-morrow to my sister; all I know I see."

Under cross-examination Madam Liard added:

"I said before the Coroner that the deceased had been kicking up a row, that is correct. At 7 p.m. on Friday, he was drunk, the prisoner was sober; she showed me her hat which he had torn, and all the bed was nearly on the floor and his stick as well. I have never seen her intoxicated. When I went into their room, I asked the deceased why all the things were on the floor; he did not say anything, but the prisoner said, "Oh, we have been playing millinery." He was drunk nearly every day. The first thing in the morning the servant used to go and fetch brandy for him to drink. That habit existed practically all the time he was in my house. When the prisoner said, 'I cannot leave him because I love him," she spoke very earnestly. When I told her the deceased had said she was no class she said, "I am a brewer's daughter." I said, "Is it possible, what do you live with a brute like him for?" It was then that she said "Because I love him, and I have lost my character, and I cannot get any work." I said, "Why are you always screaming like that?" She said, "Well, how can I help it when he comes and strangles me, and puts his hand on me like that; how can I help it?" I had not heard her screaming constantly, but I had that night. I asked her why she lived with a brute like that, because he was always knocking her down. As soon as he came home, the quarrelling began, and then you heard a bang. When he was sober, he was a perfect gentleman, but he was very seldom sober.

Dickens' spirited defence pleaded manslaughter, claiming that Byron had bought the knife to threaten to kill herself, and had only killed Baker in the heat of the moment after great provocation. However, the judge did not agree with the defence's plea of manslaughter and summed up against her in favour of a murder verdict. On 17 December 1902 the jury returned a guilty verdict on the charge of murder with a strong recommendation to mercy.

== Reprieve ==
Aylesbury Prison

The Home Secretary, Aretas Akers-Douglas, received a fifteen thousand signature petition asking for a reprieve and it was duly granted on 23 December 1902 with the sentence being reduced to life imprisonment; this she served in Holloway Prison and later in Aylesbury Prison. In 1907 her life sentence was reduced to ten years, and after having served exactly six years of her sentence Byron was released from Aylesbury Prison on 17 December 1908 on condition that she stayed in Lady Henry Somerset's home for reforming inebriate females near Reigate.

After her release Byron disappears from the historical record.

== Media portrayals ==
The case was dramatised by BBC Radio in the 1957 series Secrets of Scotland Yard in the episode "A Lesson in Love" .
