= British propaganda during World War II =

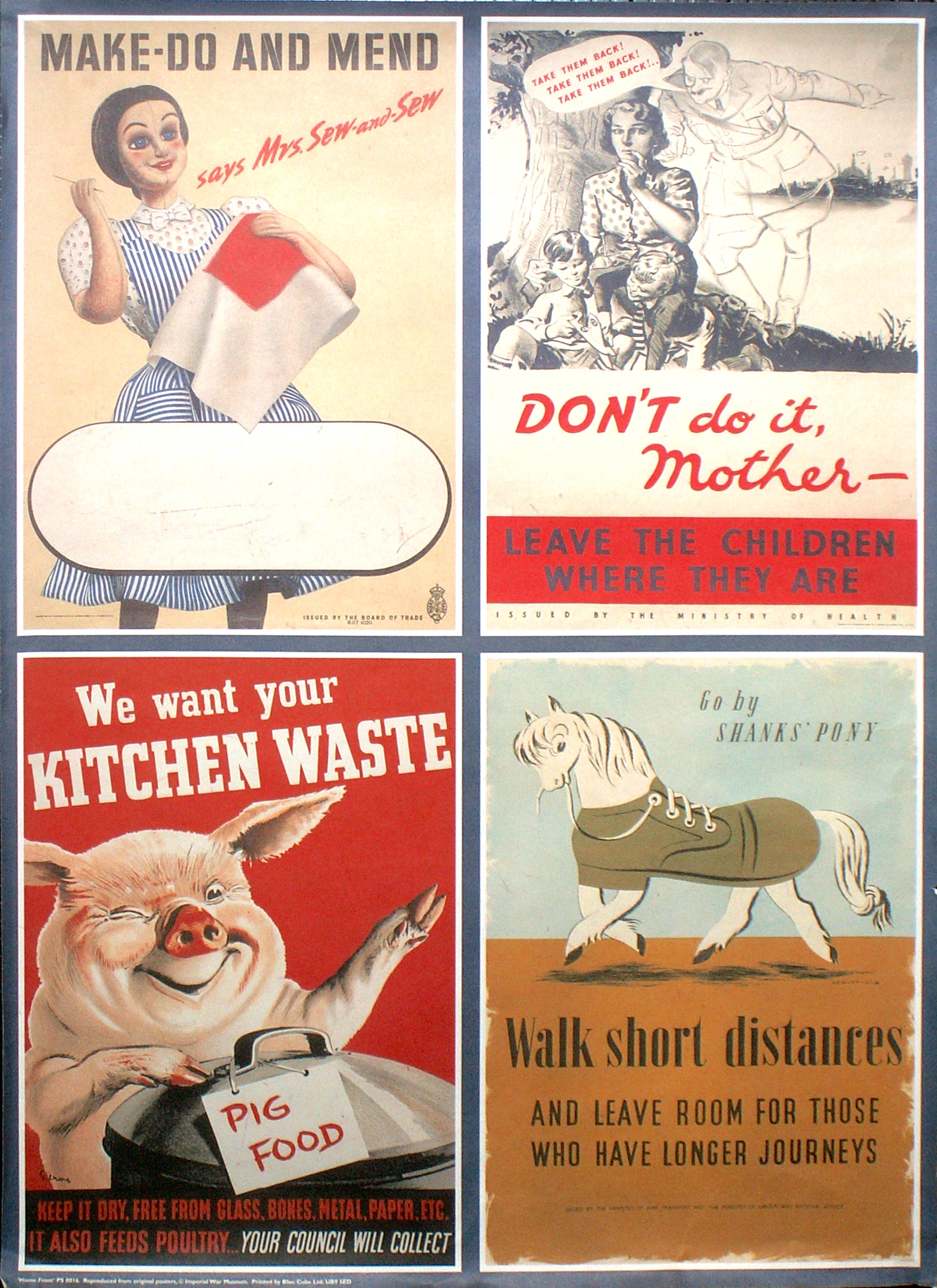
A collection of posters on various themes

Britain re-created the World War I Ministry of Information for the duration of World War II to generate propaganda to influence the population towards support for the war effort. A wide range of media was employed aimed at local and overseas audiences. Traditional forms such as newspapers and posters were joined by new media including cinema (film), newsreels and radio. A wide range of themes were addressed, fostering hostility to the enemy, support for allies, and specific pro war projects such as conserving metal and growing vegetables.

== Media ==
=== Cinema ===
The story of British cinema in the Second World War is inextricably linked with that of the Ministry of Information. Formed on 4 September 1939, the day after Britain's declaration of war, the Ministry of Information (MOI) was the central government department responsible for publicity and propaganda in the Second World War. It was the ministry's function to "present the national case to the public at home and abroad". The MOI was keenly aware of the value of commercially produced entertainment films in furthering the national cause generally and maintained close contact with film makers:

The Ministry both advised the producers on the suitability of subjects which they had suggested and proposed subjects which we thought would do good overseas. Whenever the ministry had approved a subject we gave every help to the producer in obtaining facilities to make the film.

As a result, the typical British war film attempts to construct a gripping suspense story which at the same time conveys propaganda ideas in support of the Allied cause. Kenneth Clark, as head of the Films Division of the MOI, argued in 1940 that the public must be convinced of German brutality, stating "we should emphasise wherever possible the wickedness and evil perpetrated in the occupied countries." Subsequently, the Home Planning Committee felt it essential to portray fully "the evil things which confront us ... to fortify the will to continue the struggle". By 1942, the fear of invasion (as depicted in films such as Went the Day Well?) had receded, and film makers began to turn to the brutal reality of life in occupied countries. The Day Will Dawn (1942) was a film about the Norwegian resistance, while Uncensored told the story of the Belgian resistance. Tomorrow We Live show the French Resistance and the heroism of ordinary French civilians, while One of Our Aircraft Is Missing (1942) shows Dutch civilians risking their lives to help a group of British airmen back to England.

Films were also imported. Churchill ordered the entire sequence of Frank Capra's Why We Fight to be shown to the public.

==== Newsreels ====
Newsreels had particular effect on American audiences, the dome of St. Paul's over the ruins being a particularly significant image.

=== Posters ===
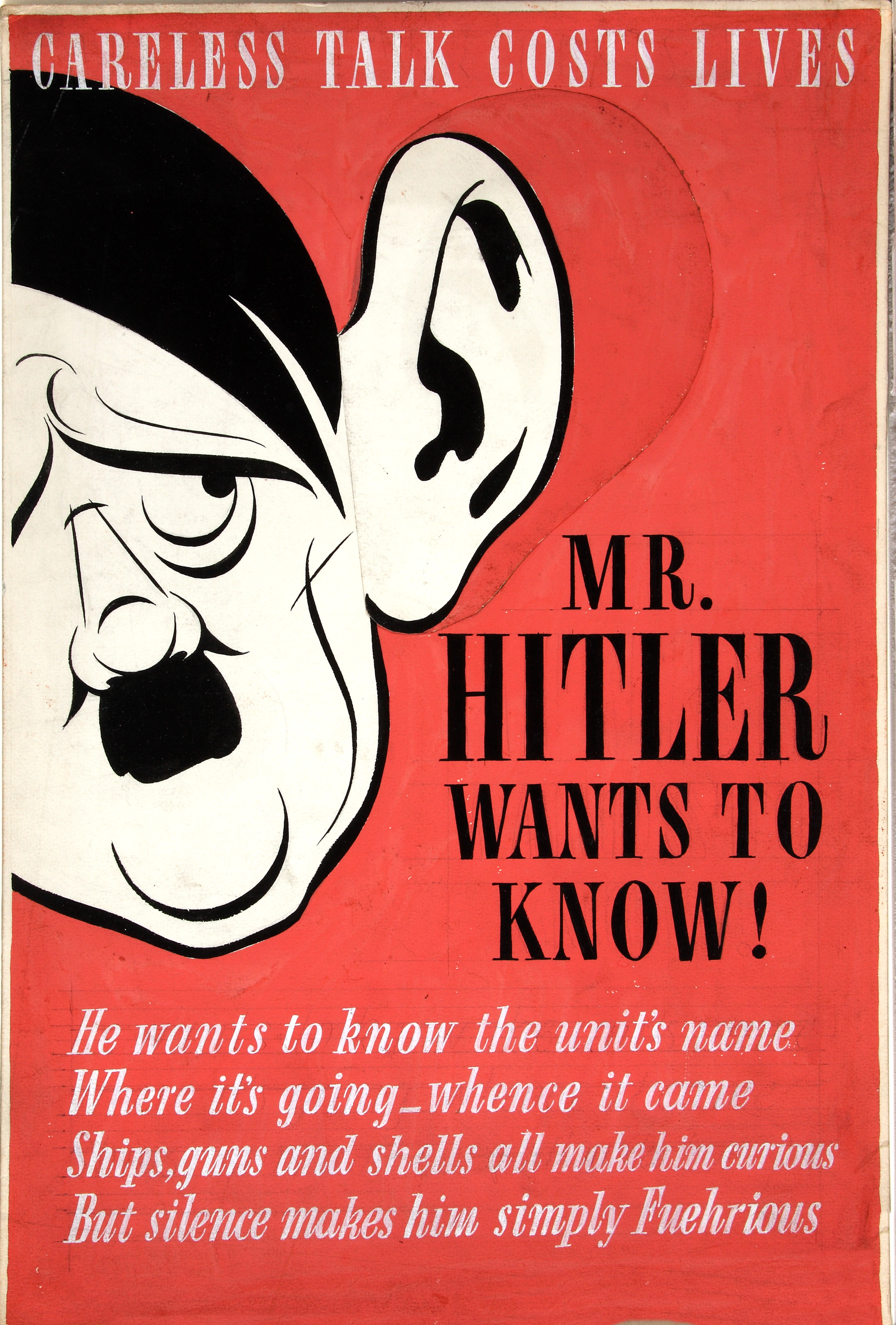
Careless talk costs lives. Mr. Hitler wants to know!

Posters were widely used in the propaganda campaigns. Their content ranged from simple instructions to purely motivational content. One series of posters for London Transport featured Billy Brown of London Town.

==== The April 1939 Motivational posters trio ====
These posters were a series of three issued as a motivational poster by the British Government in 1939. The three posters in the series were, "Freedom is in peril, defend it with all your might." "YOUR COURAGE, YOUR CHEERFULNESS AND YOUR RESOLUTION WILL BRING US VICTORY" (All versions capitalised, second printing included considerable underlining of nouns for even more emphasis) and "Keep Calm and Carry On". The original designs were approved for mass production and distribution in April 1939, though they were rarely displayed, and remaining stock was pulped in 1940.

=== Leaflets ===
Leaflets and newspapers were popularly used for propagandising enemy-held territory, by dropping them from aeroplanes. As early as the Phoney War, pamphlets were being dropped. On the anniversary of Hitler's premature declaration of victory against the Soviet Union, in 1941, copies of the Völkischer Beobachter reporting the story were dropped on Germany.

One Italian leaflet invoked Garibaldi, who had said that Italy's future was linked with Great Britain's, declaring the bombings the "curse of Garibaldi".

=== Books ===
The MOI issued a number of books for other ministries notably 'The Army at War' series for the War Office. A few weeks after D-Day, crates of books were landed in Normandy, to be distributed to French booksellers; an equal number of American and British efforts were included.

=== Radio ===
Radio was widely used, with broadcasts in 23 languages; it proved to be rather simple to the occupied countries than to Germany itself.

Edward R. Murrow's broadcasts of the Blitz were particularly useful in propagandising the United States, because of his calm, factual, and unopinionated manner; he received full rein and facilities, even access to Churchill. His reports of British courage and tenacity helped stimulate hope.

Transmitters in England would also pose as broadcasting from Germany, where mostly factual reports would be studded with lies.

== Themes ==
=== Resistance ===
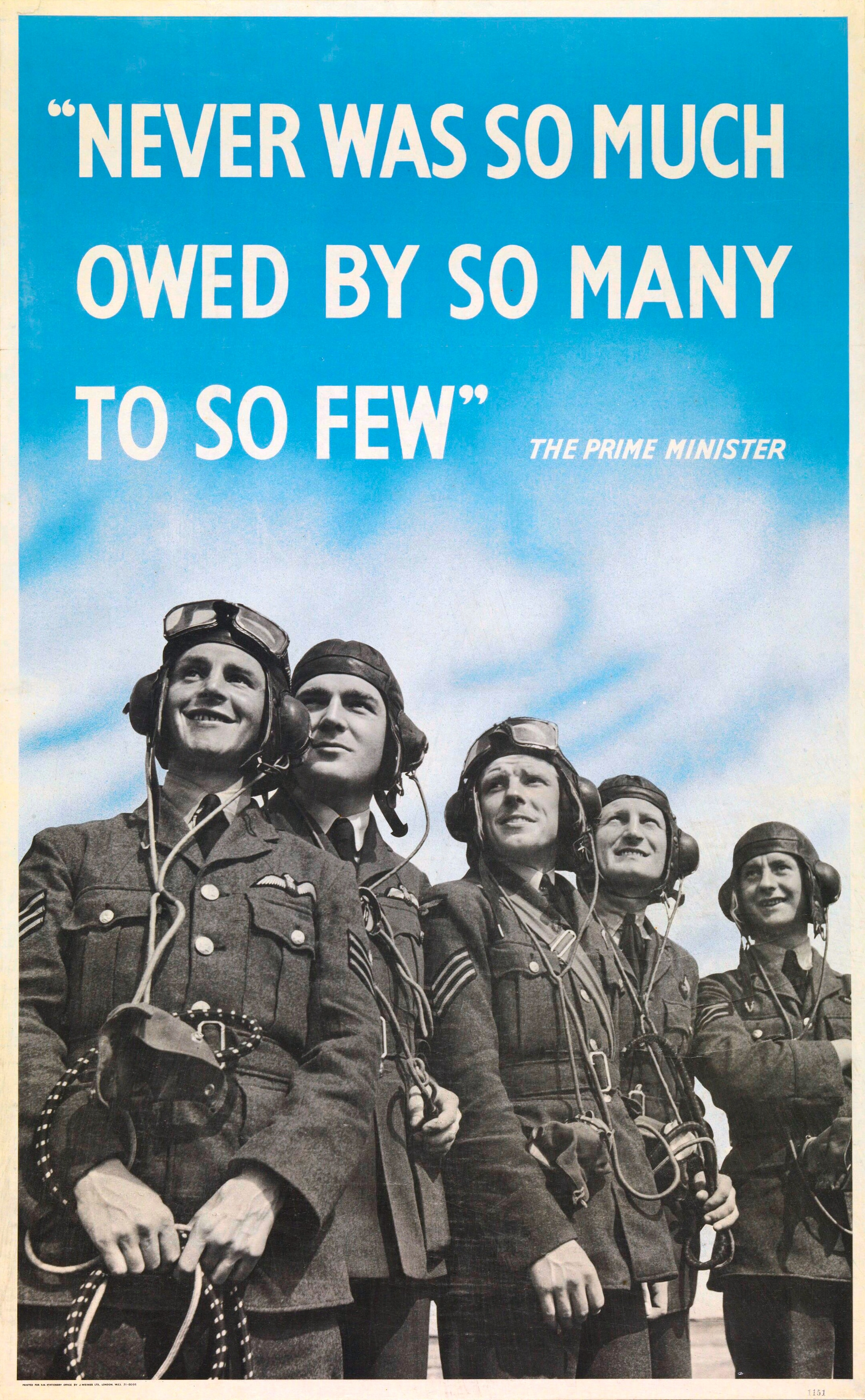
British WWII propaganda poster during the Battle of Britain.

During the Phoney War, the book Why Britain is at War sold a hundred thousand copies.

In 1940 in particular, Winston Churchill made many calls for the British to fight on, and for British units to fight until they died rather than submit. His calls for fight to victory inspired a hardening of public opinion. Determination raised the numbers of the Home Guard and inspired a willingness to fight to the last ditch, in a manner rather similar to Japanese determination, and the slogan "You can always take one with you" was used in the grimmest times of the war.

=== Victories ===
British victories were announced to the public for morale purposes, and broadcast to Germany for purposes of undermining morale.

Even during Dunkirk, an optimistic spin was put on how the soldiers were eager to return.

When the U-boat commander Günther Prien vanished with his submarine U-47, Churchill personally informed the House of Commons, and radio broadcasts to Germany asked, "Where is Prien?" until Germany was forced to acknowledge his loss.

The turn of the war made BBC's war commentaries much more stirring.

=== Work ===
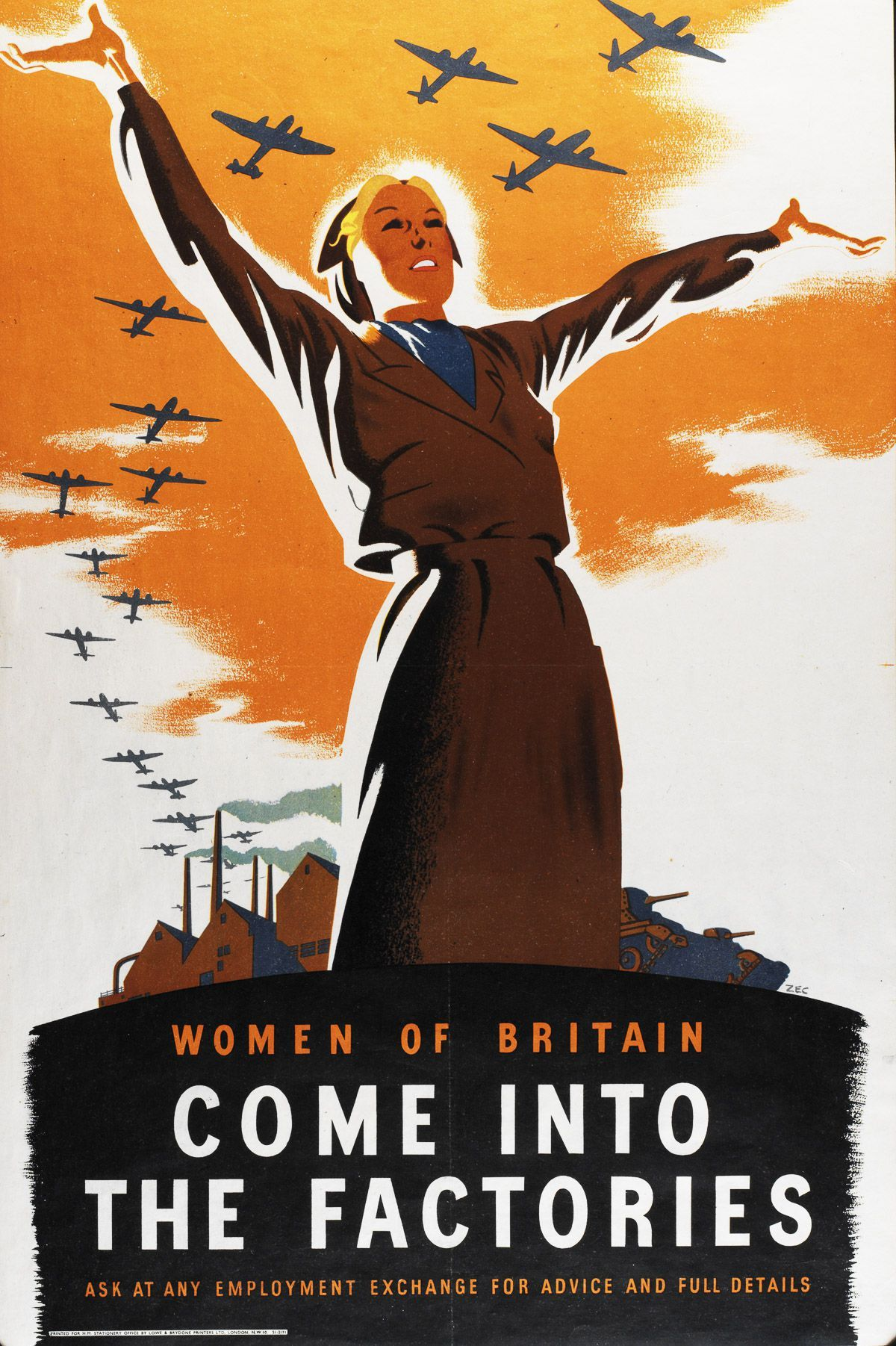
Women of Britain, Come into the Factories

Propaganda was deployed to encourage people to volunteer for onerous or dangerous war work, such as factories or Home Guard.

Male conscription ensured that general recruitment posters were not needed, but specialist services posters did exist, and many posters aimed at women such as Land Army, or ATS. Films and posters encouraged women to go to work in munitions factories.

Posters were also targeted at increasing production. Pictures of the Armed Forces often called for support from civilians, and posters juxtaposed civilian workers and soldiers to urge that the forces were relying on them and instruct them in the importance of their role.

People were encouraged to spend holidays assisting at harvest, even when they were also encouraged to stay home.

=== Evacuation of children ===
Posters urged children to be sent from London. Both pamphlets and posters urged that evacuated children not be brought back. Many were, in fact, brought back during the Phoney War, and the government redoubled efforts to persuade them to let the children remain away.

Others praised those who took such children in, such as depicting a housewife in a line of uniformed women as she welcomes children.

=== Blackout ===
Posters outlined what to do when travelling in a blackout. Instructions included the advice that torches should be pointed downwards to avoid blinding people, that care should be taken while crossing roads, and that when alighting from a train, passengers should check that the door opened on to a platform.

=== Preventing waste ===
Propaganda was deployed to encourage people to economise on travel, save waste paper, and to obey rationing. The propaganda film They Also Serve dealt with housewives' conservation efforts. People were also called to "make do" so that raw materials would be available for the war effort. Even an unattended kettle, boiling over, was waste. This was to be applied at work, as well, even though the firm was paying for wasted fuel.

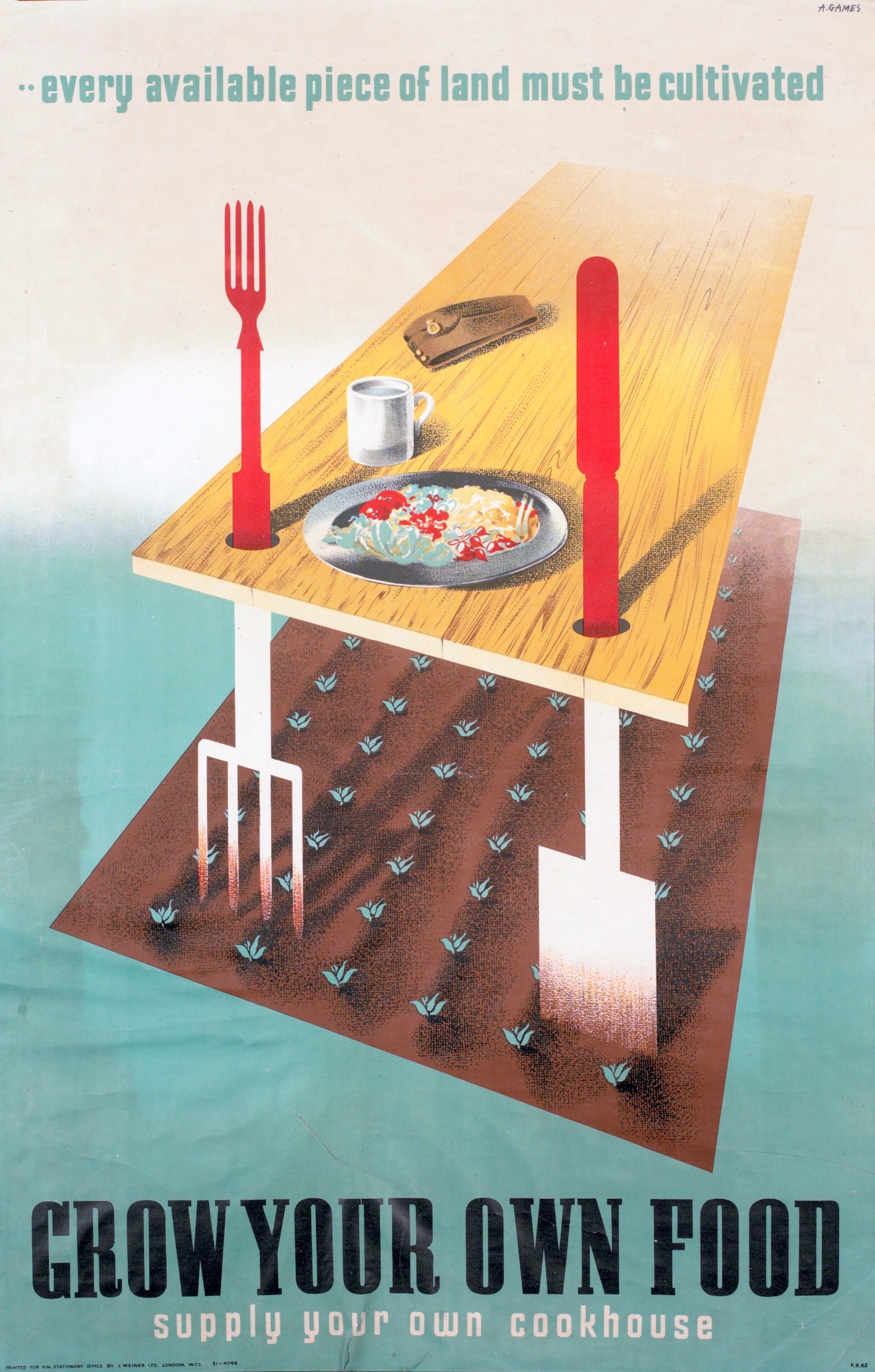
British WWII propaganda poster encouraging cultivation of food

Recipes were spread for cooking efficiently and nutritiously on the restricted diet that included many substitutions. The Ministry of Food urged that it was not clever to take more than your share. While bread was not rationed, wholemeal bread was encouraged. Propaganda also publicised that pregnant women could get orange juice and vitamin pills by bringing their ration books and medical certificate to the Food Office. Waste paper required recycling to save shipping. The Squander Bug campaign simply urged spending less.

Because the war limited other options, the bus system was overloaded, and posters urged people to walk for short distances, to ease the burden. For train journeys, posters urged consideration of whether the trip was necessary and the importance of food and ammunition carried by train.

Posters also encouraged growing food in gardens. The difficulties of the Battle of the Atlantic led to the slogan "Dig for Victory!" Every garden could be used for this purpose. Because potatoes could be grown this way, the character "Potato Pete" was created to remind people that potatoes did not take up room on ships. Radio broadcasts encouraged the nation that growing your own food was a form of recreation, not wartime sacrifice.

Salvage operations were depicted as transforming scrap to weapons. An exhibition, "Private Scrap" was created to demonstrate the uses of scrap and underscore the link between civilian efforts and the military forces. Iron railings and aluminium pots were targeted. Housewives' salvage efforts were presented militaristically, even depicting weapons as coming directly from the efforts of women to save scrap.

=== Axis ===
British propaganda, like American propaganda, presented the war as an issue of good versus evil, a factor that allowed them to rouse the population to fight a just war, and use themes of resistance and liberation to occupied countries.

==== Anti-German ====
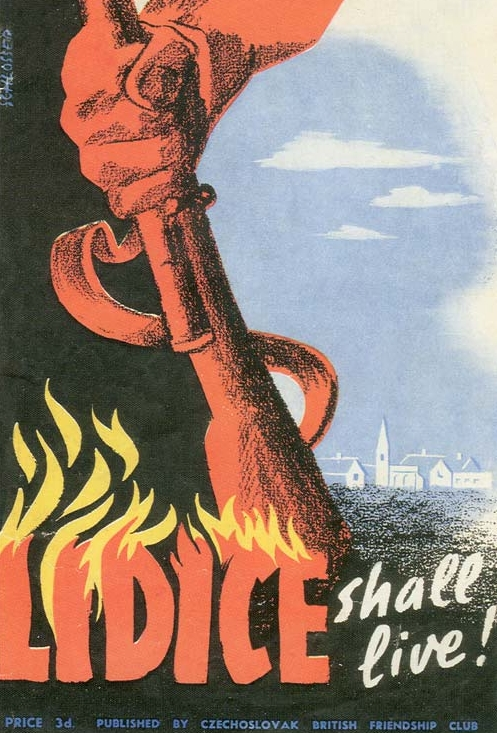
British WWII propaganda poster commemorating the village of Lidice

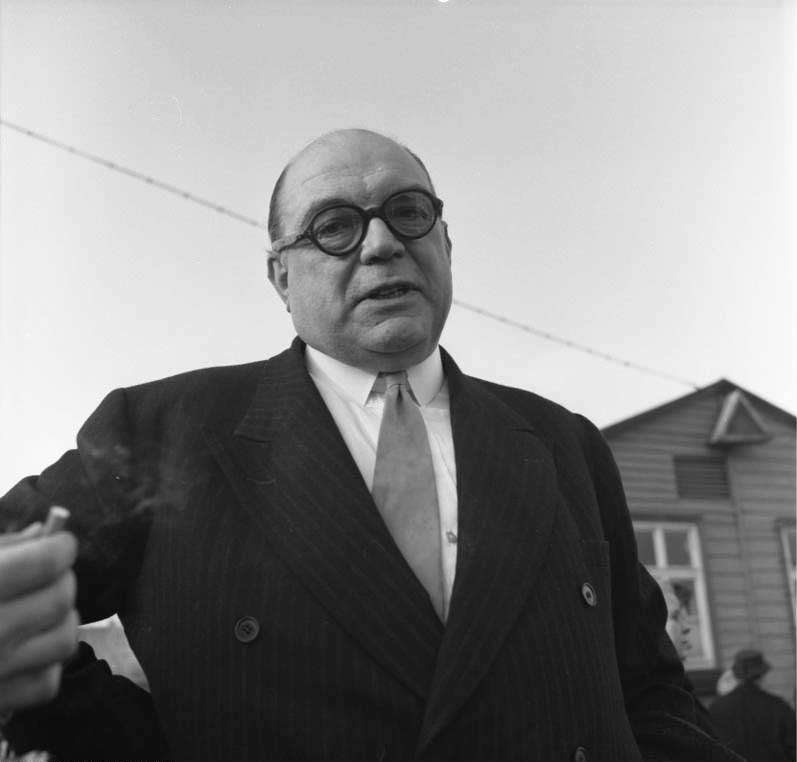
Sefton Delmer (1958)

Much was made of the dictatorial nature of Hitler's government. Germany was treated as a particular font of evil within the Axis, and a greater threat than Japan and Italy. Churchill presented Hitler as the central issue of the war. The Germans were also presented as evil, with some stating that the concentration camps would not have been possible on French or British soil.

The sinking of the SS Athenia, killing civilians including Americans, on the first day of the war was widely exploited as demonstrating that the U-boat was the same instrument of terror as in World War I; the Germans attempted to counter it by claiming the British had sunk the ship themselves to blacken Germany.

The film Men of the Lightship was created to foment anti-German feeling; not only do the Germans attack a lightship, not traditionally regarded as a proper target, but machine-gun the survivors in the water, so that only one lives. Posters depicted Germans in a sinister light. Propaganda shifted from downplaying raids to playing them up, to inspire hatred of the enemy, and sympathy with neutrals, despite the encouragement that this might give the enemy and its potential impact on the calm of the populace. Atrocity reports were presented both as summaries of known facts and news reports as they occurred.

Alternative history novels depicted Nazi invasions of Great Britain as a form of "cautionary tales". Up until 1943, these were grim tales, presenting British victims; after that, a more heroic note increased.

The instant—and unauthorised—rejection of the peace terms of Hitler's 19 July 1940 speech by Sefton Delmer on the BBC produced a great impact on Germany; Goebbels believed it had to show governmental inspiration, and while propaganda efforts were made to talk the British around, the German press were instructed to attack the rejection. The speed of the rejection unquestionably led the great impact, which authorisation would have prevented; this produced consternation in the government, as the effect was desirable, but they did not know whether such a spokesman would again happen to say what the government wanted.

==== Anti-Japanese ====
Although Winston Churchill found the disaster at Singapore and the loss of Burma, Hong Kong, and Malaya humiliating, Brendan Bracken, the minister of information regarded it as impossible to rouse the British to sentiments similar to those the British public held toward Germany, as the Japanese were across the globe and the Germans there, and his views prevailed.

The Pacific war was regarded as peripheral by most British, but anti-Japanese sentiment was used in one African recruiting poster. Posters depicting British and Australian unity often featured a Japanese figure.

The Burma campaign was taken chiefly so that the British government could say that they had recaptured their territories with their own armies. It was so neglected in news and propaganda that it was termed the "forgotten army". Similar campaigns were conducted in Malaya and Singapore, for the same reason, even though military officials preferred joining forces with the American campaigns.

A pamphlet for soldiers, "The Japanese in Battle" set out to debunk the myth of the Japanese superman after the initial wave of Japanese victories. The Spectator supported the bombing of Japan due to Japanese atrocities committed against downed Allied airmen and in China.

==== Anti-Italian ====
Italy's entrance to the war was derided for their having waited until victory looked secure, but the anti-Italian feeling never reached the pitch of anti-German sentiment.

=== Allies ===
Propaganda fomented support for allies in the war, first for the European nations and then for the USSR and USA, with support for the Commonwealth being pervasive. Promoting disunity was, in fact, a major desire of Axis forces. Depictions of forces included Malays, West Africans, and Soviet. Many posters depicted soldiers from different countries, such as Australian and British, many Commonwealth countries, various occupied countries, and many Allied countries, or British and American sailors. Merchant ships were used to dramatise Lend-Lease. Resistance movements were also depicted, sometimes with Allied agents or receiving message from them.

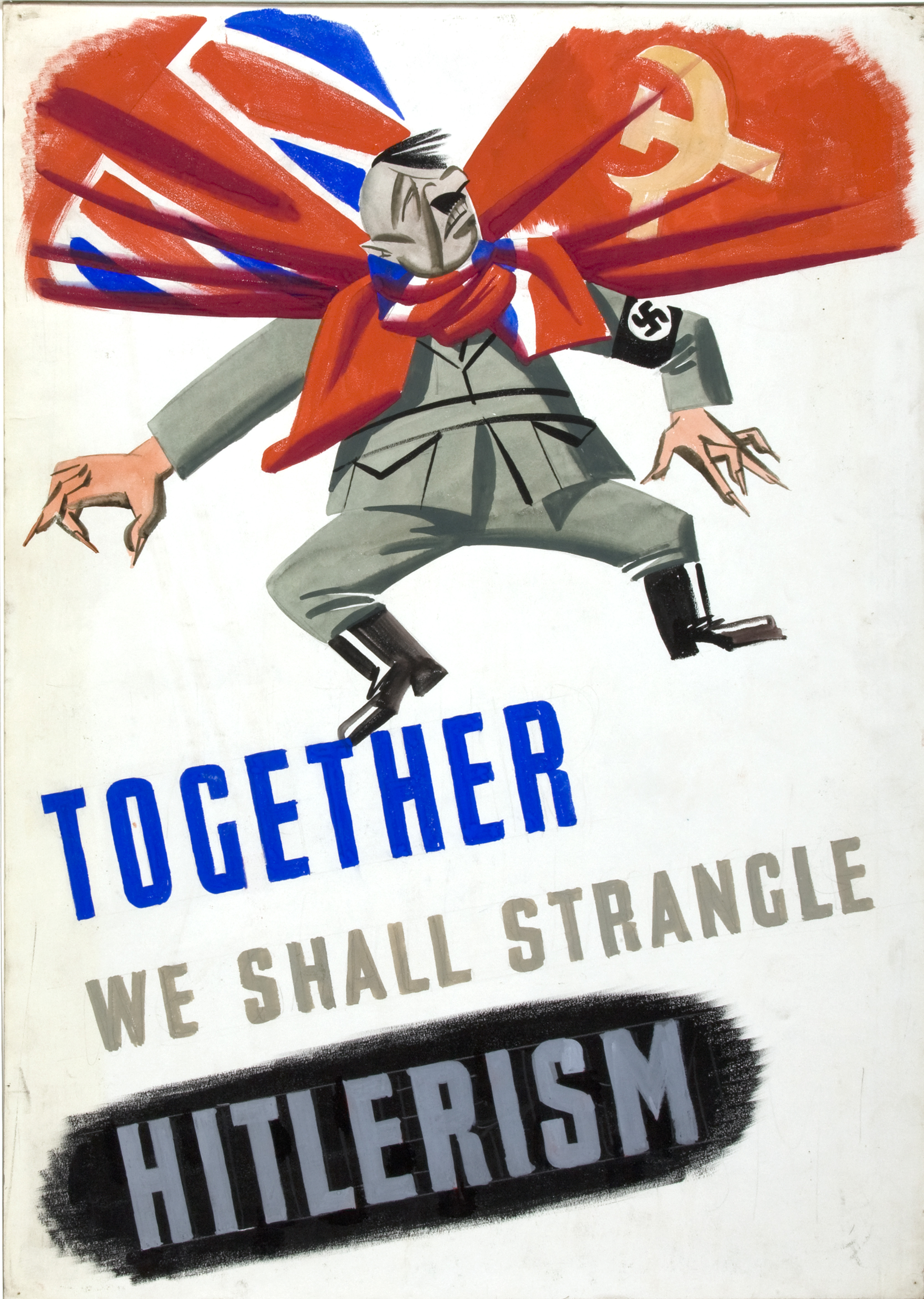
Together we shall strangle Hitlerism

==== Soviet Union ====
Prior to the German attack on the Soviet Union, the USSR was treated with hostility, such as when a paper explained that Tchaikovsky was a product of Tsarist, not Bolshevist, Russia. This treatment became more favourable after Germany's attack. The Battle of Stalingrad received particular attention as a great victory.

The British Ministry of Information put out a booklet on countering ideological fears of Bolshevism, including claims that the Red Terror was a figment of Nazi imagination. This inspired George Orwell to leave the BBC and write Animal Farm, which was suppressed by the Ministry until the end of the war. Until long after the war, the British supported the Soviet claim that the Nazis had staged the Katyn Massacre.

=== To occupied countries ===
The V Campaign targeted the occupied countries, using "V" to represent the French word for "victory" and the Dutch for "freedom", and the opening of Beethoven's Fifth Symphony where the opening notes match the Morse code for "V", for broadcasts. This alarmed the Germans until Goebbels conceived the idea of trying to reframe the use of a German composer as a German victory. British propaganda was circulated in occupied countries through the efforts of the underground movements.

=== To the United States ===
The British Security Coordination was created to propagandise the United States to enter the war, and presented massive amounts of propaganda which they successfully concealed as news reports, not one of them having been "rumbled" as a propaganda piece during the war. The news coverage of the Blitzkrieg attack was produced in America in the hopes that the public opinion of supplying the UK would turn in their favour.

=== Careless talk ===
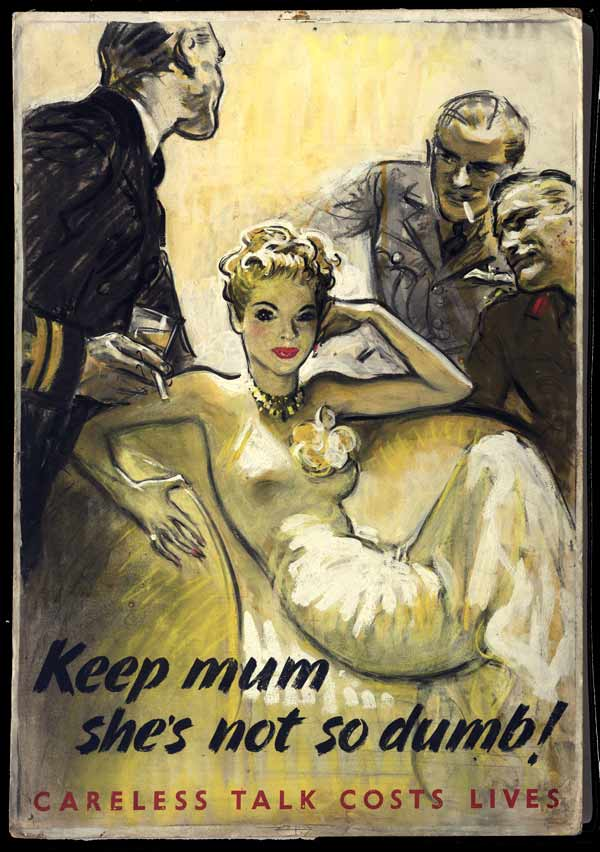
A careless talk poster

Careless talk propaganda discouraged talking about sensitive material where it could be overheard by spies, showing either an Axis eavesdropper or depicting a death caused by such information leaking. It was also intended to prevent morale-sapping rumours from spreading. The first posters were illustrated by "Fougasse" (Cyril Bird), a comic artist. After concluding that such talk was not a serious source of intelligence, and would often be dismissed as a plant, the campaign was not increased.

This also was the theme of the film The Next of Kin.

==== Keep mum ====
Originating in a 1940 campaign with the catchphrase "Be like Dad, keep Mum," the best-known image from this campaign is the 1942 poster "Keep mum, she's not so dumb" by the architect and artist Gerald Lacoste. It depicts a glamorous blonde woman reclining, and officers from each branch of the Armed Forces about her talking to each other. It is implied that the officers are talking military secrets, on the (wrongful) assumption that the woman is only a "dumb blonde" and so will not pass these secrets on to the enemy.

The campaign was issued in 1942 to all ranks, with this particular image intended for messes and other places where officers met. At the end of May, Advertiser's Weekly noted that "sex appeal" had been introduced in the form of a beautiful spy, whom they insisted on "christening Olga Polovsky after the famous song." In June 1941 they further noted that, having covered public house talk, wayside conversations with strangers, and "harmless chat" with friends when on leave, the government believed they had identified "the major problem" at last. The campaign was to make a direct appeal along the lines of "Cherchez la femme," as a reminder that "when in the company of a beautiful woman, remember that beauty may conceal brains." Service personnel seemed particularly ready to disclose their station and line of work.

==== Careless talk costs lives ====
The best known images from this series are by Fougasse, depicting people giving away secrets in everyday situations (e.g. sitting on the bus, not seeing caricatures of Hitler, Goebbels, and Goering sitting behind them).

== See also ==
- British propaganda during World War I
- War art in The National Archives (United Kingdom)
- American propaganda during World War II
- Propaganda and India in World War II
- Nazi propaganda
- Propaganda in Japan during the Second Sino-Japanese War and World War II
- Propaganda of Fascist Italy
- Rommel myth
- Soviet propaganda during World War II
- Soldatensender Calais
- Black propaganda
