= Cecil Whiteley =

British judge (1875–1942)

Cecil Whiteley in 1931

George Cecil Whiteley KC DL JP (1875–1942) was Common Serjeant of London from 1933 to 1942 and a Judge at the Mayor's and City of London Court.

Cecil Whiteley attended Dulwich College, where he had an undistinguished academic record, before studying at King's College, Cambridge, where he graduated BA in 1897 with a Third Class degree in the Classical Tripos. He was appointed a Treasury Counsel in 1915, in which year he appeared for the prosecution at the Old Bailey with Archibald Bodkin (later Director of Public Prosecutions) and Travers Humphreys against George Joseph Smith, the 'Brides in the Bath' murderer. In 1919 Whiteley prosecuted in the case of the Epsom Riot, when about four hundred Canadian soldiers rioted and attacked the police station at Epsom on 17 June 1919. During the riot Station-Sergeant Green was so badly injured that he died the following day.

He was appointed Recorder of Sandwich in Kent in 1920, and a King's Counsel (KC) in 1921. In the 1922 Edith Thompson and Frederick Bywaters murder case Whiteley defended Bywaters. In 1925 Whiteley served as the Chairman of the Surrey Quarter Sessions and, in 1931, of the London Quarter Sessions. He was the Deputy Lieutenant of the County of Surrey in 1925. He became of Recorder of West Ham in 1929, and of Southend-on-Sea in 1930.

Whiteley was a Judge at the Mayor's and City of London Court from 1932 to 1934; in the latter year he succeeded Henry Holman Gregory KC as Common Serjeant of London, an ancient office first recorded in 1291 with the appointment of Thomas Juvenal, and the second most senior judicial position at the Old Bailey after the Recorder of London. In 1939 he became a Governor of Dulwich College.

Norah Turner, the socialite (later Lady Docker) was a dance hostess at London's Cafe de Paris when a young woman. Her autobiography records that she courted by three men simultaneously, known as ‘The Judge, the Duke and the Frenchman’.'The Judge' was Cecil Whiteley and 'The Duke' was the Ninth Duke of Marlborough.

In the 1981 British television series Lady Killers an episode called The Darlingest Boy dealt with the Thompson-Bywaters murder case. In it Whiteley was played by actor Terrence Hardiman.

Whiteley died in 1942 aged 67. He was succeeded as Common Serjeant by Hugh Loveday Beazley.

== Publications ==
- Cecil Whiteley, K.C., D.L 'Brief Life' Macmillan & Co., Ltd, London (1942)
