= ITV Breakfast =

British breakfast television company

ITV Breakfast Limited
- Type: Breakfast television
- First air date: 1 January 1993 (as GMTV); 6 September 2010 (as Daybreak); 28 April 2014 (as Good Morning Britain)
- Headquarters: The London Studios (1993–2018); Television Centre (2018–2025); ITN headquarters (2026–present)
- Area: National (Breakfast 6:00 am – 9:25 am)
- Owner: ITV plc
- Former names: GMTV
- Affiliation: ITV
- Official website: Good Morning Britain
- Replaced: GMTV

ITV Breakfast Limited (previously known as GMTV Limited) is the national ITV breakfast television licensee, broadcasting in the United Kingdom. It became a wholly owned subsidiary of ITV plc in November 2009.

GMTV, as an on-screen brand name, ended on 3 September 2010, with the newly-rebranded ITV Breakfast launching new weekday breakfast programmes Daybreak and Lorraine on 6 September 2010. In March 2014, it was announced Daybreak had been axed amid poor ratings. The programme was replaced on Monday 28 April 2014 by Good Morning Britain, reprising the title of a previous ITV early-morning programme. The Lorraine segment was not been affected by the changes, but from January 2026 is no longer broadcast during the ITV Breakfast time-slot - now airing from 09:30 for 30 weeks of the year.

At weekends, ITV Breakfast would air children's programming, a simulcast of the channel CITV, until August 2023, when kids programmes were moved to ITVX and ITV2. Daytime repeats are now broadcast during the earlier hours of the ITV Breakfast slot at weekends.

The talk show Weekend was broadcast on Saturdays and Sundays at 8:30 a.m. until 2017 when it didn't return after the Christmas break. It was hosted by Aled Jones. Various other similar talk shows have aired in this slot, including Martin & Roman's Weekend Best!.

ITV Breakfast Limited is a subsidiary of ITV Broadcasting Limited. Until December 2025, the main shows, Good Morning Britain and Lorraine were produced by ITV Breakfast Ltd, a subsidiary of ITV Studios. From January 2026, GMB is now produced by ITN, while Lorraine is now produced by Multistory Media.

== Programmes ==
=== Weekdays ===
==== GMTV (1993–2010) ====
GMTV (1993–2000, 2009–2010)

- Monday to Thursday 06:00 – 08:30 (Friday 09:25)

GMTV Newshour (1997–2009)

- Monday to Friday 06:00 – 07:00

GMTV Today (2000–2009)

- Monday to Friday 07:00 – 08:30 (Friday 09:25)

GMTV with Lorraine (2009–2010)

- Monday to Thursday 08:30 – 09:25

==== ITV Breakfast (2010–present) ====
Daybreak (2010–2014)

- 06:00 – 08:30 (2010–2012)
- 07:00 – 08:30 (2012–2014)

Good Morning Britain (2014–present)

- 06:00 – 08:30 (2014–2020)
- 06:00 – 09:00 (2020–2025)
- 06:00 – 09:30 (2026–present) (when Lorraine is on air)
- 06:00 – 10:00 (2026–present) (when Lorraine is off air)

GMB Today (August 2017)

- 08:30 – 09:25

Good Morning Britain with Lorraine (March–July 2020, December 2021)

- 09:00 – 10:00

Lorraine (2010–present)

- 08:30 – 09:25 (2010–2020)
- 09:00 – 10:00 (2020–2025)
- 09:30 – 10:00 (2026–present) (no longer on air during ITV Breakfast hours)

=== Weekends ===
Tenure(s)	Show	Saturday	Sunday
2014–2017	Weekend	✓	✓
2018	Zoe Ball on...Saturday/Sunday	✓	✓
2019	The Sara Cox Show	✓	✓
2020	Martin & Roman's Sunday Best!	✗	✓
2021	Martin & Roman's Weekend Best!	✓	✓
2022	ITV News: Weekend Morning	✓	✓
2022	Garraway's Good Stuff	✓	✗
2022	Big Zuu's Breakfast Show	✗	✓
2022	Vick Hope's Breakfast Show	✗	✓
2022–2024	Katie Piper's Breakfast Show	✗	✓
2023	Oti Mabuse's Breakfast Show	✓	✗
2023	Laura Whitmore's Breakfast Show	✗	✓
2024–present	Prue Leith's Cotswold Kitchen	✓	✗
2024	The Chris McCausland Show	✓	✗
2024–present	Jimmy and Shivi's Farmhouse Breakfast	✗	✓

== See also ==
- List of ITV Breakfast programmes
- Timeline of breakfast television in the United Kingdom

ITV national franchise
Preceded by GMTV	Breakfast television 6 September 2010 – present	Current provider
