= The Brides in the Bath =

2003 British television film

- Screenplay by: Glenn Chandler
- Directed by: Harry Bradbeer
- Starring: Martin Kemp; Tracey Wilkinson; Charlotte Randle; Emma Ferguson
- Theme music composer: Richard Taylor
- Country of origin: United Kingdom
- Original language: English

Production
- Producers: David Reynolds; Alan Dossor
- Cinematography: Robin Vidgeon
- Editor: David Aspinall
- Running time: 120 minutes
- Production company: Yorkshire Television

Original release
- Network: ITV
- Release: 31 December 2003

The Brides in the Bath is a 2003 television film by Yorkshire Television for ITV, based on the life and trial of British serial killer and bigamist George Joseph Smith, the "Brides in the Bath Murderer". Martin Kemp plays the role of Smith, and Richard Griffiths plays barrister Sir Edward Marshall-Hall. The film was directed by Harry Bradbeer, and written by Glenn Chandler.

== Production ==
Set to portray coastal Weymouth, filming took place in Yorkshire locations of Bridlington, Filey and Scarborough from June to mid-July 2003. Bradford City Hall in Bradford, doubled for the court room and holding cells of the Old Bailey in the City of London.

== Plot ==
The film focuses on the trial of George Smith and flashbacks showing how he met each of his wives. Smith is married to his wife Edith. He often goes away on the pretext of business. Whilst he is away he meets wealthy women, marries them within a few weeks, insures their lives and then drowns them in the bath. He returns with the insurance money (sometimes he brings the latest victims' possessions to Edith as gifts). He is eventually arrested and ultimately hanged for his crimes. At the trial it is revealed that his marriage to Edith is bigamous; in total he had eight wives, most of whom he left after stealing all of their possessions.

== Cast ==
- Martin Kemp as George Joseph Smith
- Richard Griffiths as Sir Edward Marshall-Hall
- Charlotte Randle as Bessie Mundy
- Emma Ferguson as Alice Burnham
- Jennifer Calvert as Caroline Thornhill
- Susan Brown as Mrs Crossley
- Carolyn Backhouse as Margaret Lofty
- Tracey Wilkinson as Edith Smith
- Peter Wight as Charles Burnham
- Joanna David as Elizabeth Burnham
- James Woolley as Archibald Bodkin
- Howard Gay as Montague Shearman
- Philip Voss as Mr Justice Scrutton
- Lisa Ellis as Maisy Crossley
- Alan McKenna as DI Arthur Neil
- Ian Connaughton as Travers Humphreys
- Anthony Calf as Howard Mundy
- Timothy Kightley as Mr Wilkinson
- Philip Bowen as Dr French
- Ian Barritt as Dr Billing
- Helen Ryan as Mrs Farraday
- Joanna Wake as Louise Blatch
- Stephanie Fayerman as Miss Rapley
- Naomi Allisstone as Ellen Stanley
- Ed Waters as DS Page
- Robert Calvert as Police Constable
- Tim Beasley as Clerk of the Court
- John Banfield as Jury Foreman
- Joanna Booth as Bessie's Companion
- Corinne Handforth as Bessie's Companion
