= Harry Poland =

British barrister

Sir Harry Bodkin Poland (1829–1928) was a British barrister who worked at the Bar from 1851 to 1895. He also served as counsel to the Treasury and Adviser to the Home Office from 1865 to 1889. He was knighted in 1895.

In his memoir "Seventy-Two Years at the Bar", Poland cited two cases as his most interesting. The first was the Bank of England case of 1872 in which four Americans attempted to steal £100,000 from the Bank of England by forging bank notes. The second was the Chocolate Cream Poisoner case, where Christiana Edmunds poisoned a number of people in Brighton by lacing chocolates with strychnine.

From 1895 to 1901 he sat as a Moderate Party alderman on the London County Council.

Sir Harry Bodkin Poland replaced his uncle Sir William Henry Bodkin as the Recorder of the Borough of Dover. On his resignation, he was succeeded in the role by his nephew Archibald Bodkin. He was a confirmed bachelor.
