= Martin Kemp =

English musician and actor (born 1961)

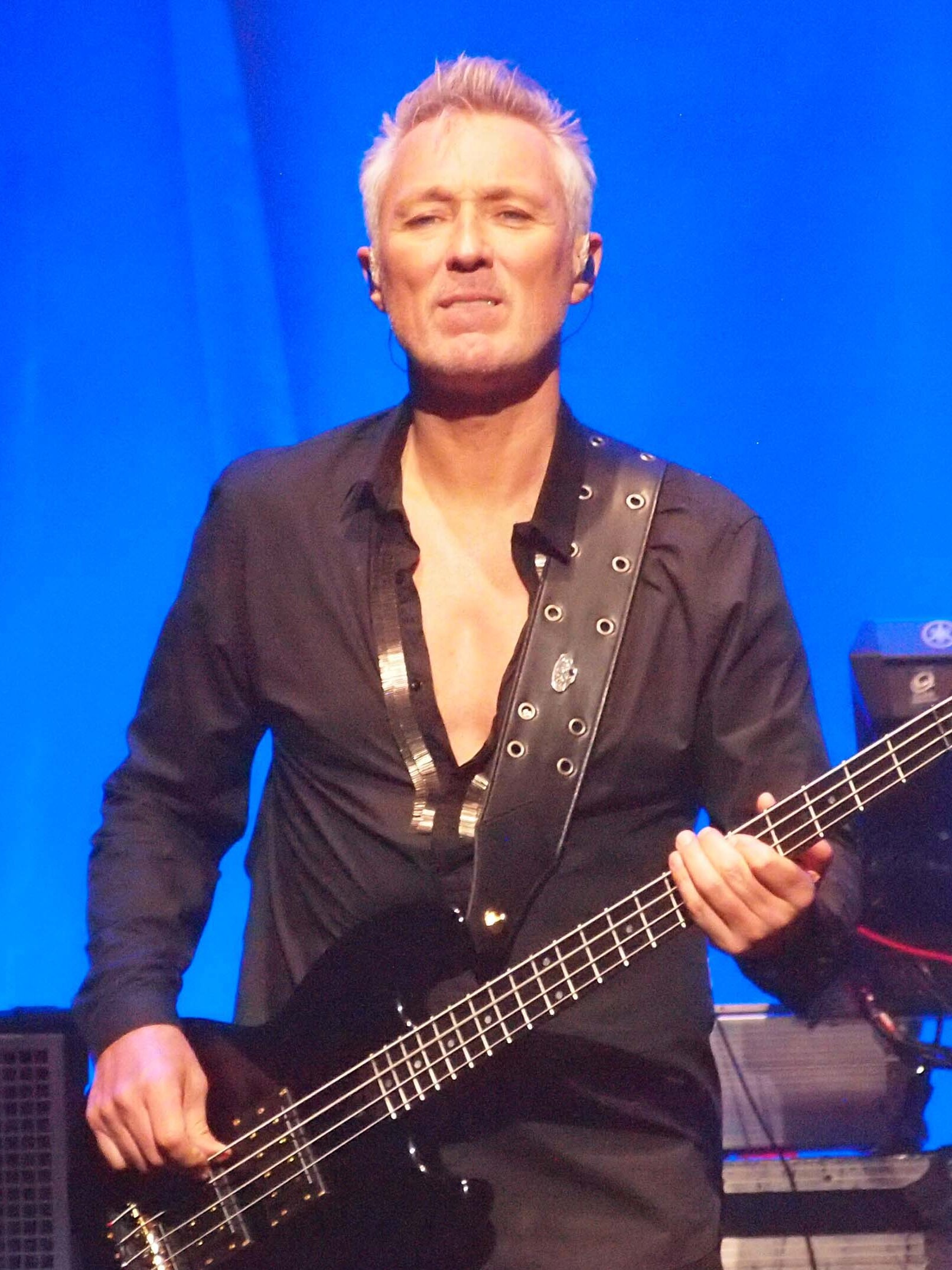
- Kemp performing in 2015
- Born: 10 October 1961 (age 65); Islington, London, England
- Occupations: Musician; actor; film director
- Years active: 1972–present
- Television: EastEnders (1998–2002)
- Spouse: Shirlie Holliman (m. 1988)
- Children: 2, including Roman Kemp
- Relatives: Gary Kemp (brother)
- Musical career
- Genres: Pop; pop rock; blue-eyed soul; jazz; swing; new wave; funk; synthpop
- Instrument: Bass guitar
- Years active: 1979–present
- Labels: SlipStream; PolyGram; EMI; CBS; Sony BMG; Parlophone Records; Chrysalis Records

Martin John Kemp (born 10 October 1961) is an English musician and actor, best known as the bassist in the new wave band Spandau Ballet and for his role as Steve Owen in EastEnders.

He is the younger brother of Gary Kemp, who is also a member of Spandau Ballet and an actor. In 2012, Kemp finished third in the tenth series of Celebrity Big Brother, and in 2017 he appeared as a judge on the BBC series Let It Shine. He appeared on the 25th series of I’m a Celebrity... Get Me Out of Here!, finishing in 7th place.

== Early life ==
Kemp was born to Frank and Eileen Kemp at their house in Islington, north London, and attended Rotherfield Junior School. From the age of 7 he attended the Anna Scher Theatre drama club with his brother Gary, and appeared in many TV shows, including Jackanory, The Tomorrow People and Dixon of Dock Green. In his last year with Anna Scher, he won a role in an episode of the BBC television series The Glittering Prizes, appearing alongside Tom Conti and Nigel Havers in 1976.

Kemp is of English & Ulster-Scots descent and grew up in north London, where he attended Central Foundation Boys' School, Islington. After leaving school at 16, he began an apprenticeship in a print factory, but soon became disenchanted.

== Spandau Ballet ==
Kemp's life changed when Steve Dagger, the manager of his brother Gary's band the Gentry, suggested Martin should replace the band's bass-player. Kemp learned to play bass in three months and performed for the first time with the Gentry at a college party. Eventually the band was renamed Spandau Ballet and Kemp left his printing job to concentrate on the band full-time.

Spandau Ballet went on to have a great deal of success in the New Romantic era, with four of their albums reaching the top ten of the UK Albums Chart. True also gave the band their first UK number-one album and, with the album's title track, single. Kemp also performed with the band on the popular 1984 famine-relief-project song "Do They Know It's Christmas?", written by Bob Geldof and Midge Ure. Because of a dispute over royalties, the band split up in the early 1990s.

Spandau Ballet announced they had reformed at a press conference on HMS Belfast on 25 March 2009. The band also announced a world tour, beginning with dates in the UK and Ireland in October 2009.

== Later career ==
Kemp and his brother Gary returned to acting in 1990, both appearing in the British film The Krays, in which they played the notorious gangster twins Ronald and Reginald Kray. Their performances received a great deal of critical acclaim. After The Krays, Martin Kemp moved to Los Angeles in the early 1990s and made appearances in television series such as The Outer Limits and Highlander: The Series. He also appeared in several Hollywood films, including Waxwork II: Lost in Time (1992) and Embrace of the Vampire (1994).

In 1995, Kemp moved back to the United Kingdom and took a break from acting for a short while, recovering from removal of two benign brain tumours. He resumed his acting career in 1998 when he made a guest appearance in the ITV police drama series The Bill. He went on to become popular for his role as villain Steve Owen in the BBC's top soap opera, EastEnders, from December 1998. His character was involved in some of the soap's highest-rated storylines, such as the Saskia Duncan murder and "Who Shot Phil?". By the time he left the series in 2002, he was one of the best-known faces on British television. He was the subject of This Is Your Life in 1999, when he was surprised by Michael Aspel while filming a scene for EastEnders. Kemp won three TV Quick Awards for Best Soap Actor (2000, 2001, 2002), a National Television Award for Most Popular Actor (2000) and five British Soap Awards (Villain of the Year in 2000, Best Actor in 2001 and 2002, and Sexiest Male in 2001 and 2002) for his work on EastEnders.

Kemp signed a contract with ITV in 2002 and starred in several television dramas, including The Brides in the Bath, in which he played real-life murderer George Smith, and Can't Buy Me Love opposite fellow EastEnders star Michelle Collins, which was based on a true story about a man who conned his wife and friends into believing he had won the lottery. He also starred in the short-lived crime drama series Family in 2003. From 2004 to 2007, he was the face of furniture chain ScS. He starred in a low-budget British film titled Back in Business which had a limited release in a few cinemas in February 2007 and one month later was released on DVD. He founded his own production company and in March 2008 directed a low-budget 20-minute short film entitled Karma Magnet, which starred his brother Gary and featured Martin's wife and son, Shirlie and Roman. This was released only online.

Kemp appeared on a celebrity special of Who Wants to Be a Millionaire? in January 2008 with his brother Gary to raise awareness of and funds for the Encephalitis Society. Along with his son, Kemp also featured in one edition of a factual television series for Five, Dangerous Adventures For Boys, based on the best-selling book written by Conn and Hal Iggulden, The Dangerous Book for Boys. In 2008, he appeared on the Discovery Channel television programme Chop Shop where the cast built him a gangster car. He hosted TV's 50 Hardest Men for Sky One in July 2008 and guest-starred as Mr. Burley in BBC drama series Waterloo Road. The year 2011 saw him starring as "Dr. Lawrence" in Jack Falls. In November 2011 Kemp appeared as a contestant on the second series of ITV's 71 Degrees North but quit after three days. Kemp's first feature film as director, Stalker, was released in 2011.

Kemp was announced as the thirteenth celebrity to participate in the summer series of Celebrity Big Brother 2012. Kemp appeared in the final episode and was placed third on 7 September 2012.

From February to April 2016, Kemp appeared as the Child Catcher in the UK and Ireland tour of the musical Chitty Chitty Bang Bang, alongside Jason Manford, Phil Jupitus and Michelle Collins.

Kemp hosted the first series of "Martin Kemp's Murder Files", aired from November 2016, on the UK TV channel Quest. The show provided detailed accounts of crimes and a step-by-step forensic analysis as to how the evil killers were eventually identified. Murderers featured on the show included the Yorkshire Ripper and the Green River Killer.

In December 2017, he appeared as Captain Hook in Peter Pan – The World's Biggest Pantomime at the Barclaycard Arena in Birmingham and the SSE Arena in Wembley alongside Bradley Walsh as Smee.

In November 2019, Kemp and his wife released their first album together as Martin & Shirlie, titled In the Swing of It via Sony Music. The album contains duet covers of classic jazz standards plus two original songs written by their daughter Harley Moon Kemp.

In June 2020, Kemp, with his son Roman premiered as hosts of the new Sunday breakfast programme for ITV, Martin & Roman's Sunday Best!. In October 2020, Kemp with his wife Shirley published Shirlie and Martin Kemp: It's a Love Story, an autobiography-cum-relationship advice book. The Kemps said the book was published in response to "growing media interest" in the couple's longlasting relationship.

In February 2021, Kemp appeared in McDonald & Dodds, starring alongside Jason Watkins and Rob Brydon. On 24 March 2021, Kemp and son Roman featured in an episode of ITV's DNA Journey. In April 2021, Kemp and his son Roman Kemp began presenting Martin & Roman's Weekend Best; a spin-off of Martin & Roman's Sunday Best!.

In December 2021, Kemp appeared as Father Christmas as part of a government campaign to encourage people to get their coronavirus vaccinations ahead of the Christmas holidays.

In January 2023, Kemp appeared alongside his wife Shirlie Kemp on the fourth series of The Masked Singer as "Cat & Mouse".

In 2025, Kemp took part in series 25 of I'm a Celebrity...Get Me Out of Here! and was the sixth contestant to be voted off finishing in seventh place.

== Personal life ==
Kemp has been married to Shirlie Holliman since 1988. Holliman is a former backing singer of the group Wham! and one half of the 1980s pop duo, Pepsi & Shirlie. The couple have one daughter, Harleymoon and a son, Roman (born January 1993).

He is a patron of British/Irish charity the Encephalitis Society. At the time he became a patron, he confirmed that he had controlled epilepsy since the 1990s, as a result of two brain tumours. Following surgery to remove the tumours, Kemp had a protective metal plate implanted over his brain under the scalp. The plate is unnoticeable but not undetectable; during an appearance on the Frank Skinner Show in 2002, Kemp jokingly remarked he could never slip quietly through metal-detectors at airports, as the plate would set the alarm off.

On 20 January 2006, Kemp opened a new CT scanning suite at Russells Hall Hospital, Dudley, West Midlands.

Kemp is a lifelong Arsenal fan, having been born and raised in the Highbury area.

In 2021, Kemp and his wife moved to Hertfordshire and embarked on the renovation of a Victorian property, including an extensive garden. In May 2024 they were featured in BBC's coverage of the Chelsea Flower Show.

== Filmography ==
=== Film ===
| Year | Title | Role | Notes |
|---|---|---|---|
| 1990 | The Krays | Reggie Kray | Film debut |
| 1992 | Waxwork II: Lost in Time | Baron Von Frankenstein | |
| 1992 | Daydream Believer | Digby Olsen | |
| 1993 | Aspen Extreme | Franz Hauser | |
| 1993 | Desire | Gordon Lewis | |
| 1994 | Fleshtone | Matthew Greco | |
| 1994 | Boca | Reb | |
| 1995 | Embrace of the Vampire | Vampire | |
| 1995 | Cyber Bandits | Jack Morris | |
| 1998 | Monk Dawson | David Allenby | |
| 1999 | Sugar Town | Jonesy | |
| 2007 | Back in Business | Will Spencer | |
| 2010 | The Rapture | Victor Walker | |
| 2011 | Jack Falls | Dr. Lawrence | |
| 2011 | How to Stop Being a Loser | Zeus | |
| 2012 | Strippers vs Werewolves | Mickey | |
| 2013 | The Best Years | Simon McKnight | |
| 2015 | Assassin | Lee Alberts | |
| 2015 | Age of Kill | Sam Blake | |
| 2020 | The Loss Adjuster | Lee Leicester | |
| 2024 | A Gangster’s Kiss | Don | |
| 2026 | Doctor Plague | John Verney | |

=== Television ===
| Year | Title | Role | Notes |
|---|---|---|---|
| 1972 | Jackanory | Extra | Unknown episode |
| 1972 | The Edwardians | Extra | Unknown episode |
| 1972 | Mind Where You Are Going | Extra | TV film |
| 1973 | A Picture of Katherine Mansfield | Extra | Unknown episode |
| 1973 | Scribble | Extra | Unknown episode |
| 1973 | The Tomorrow People | Extra | Unknown episode |
| 1973 | Oranges and Lemons | Extra | Unknown episode |
| 1973 | Dixon of Dock Green | Boy | Episode: "Eye Witness" |
| 1975 | Play for Today | Lad | Episode: "Rumpole of the Bailey" |
| 1976 | The Glittering Prizes | Graham Black | Episode: "A Country Life" |
| 1992 | Growing Rich | Driver | All 6 episodes |
| 1993 | Highlander: The Series | Alfred Cahill | Episode: "Avenging Angel" |
| 1994 | Murder Between Friends | Bill Fontanille | TV film |
| 1995 | The Outer Limits | Michael Deighton | Episode: "Blood Brothers" |
| 1996 | Tales from the Crypt | Lieutenant Luger | Episode: "Escape" |
| 1998 | The Bill | Tom Marsh | Episode: "The Bus Driver's Prayer" |
| 1998 | Supply & Demand | Eddie McEwan | All 6 episodes |
| 1998–2002 | EastEnders | Steve Owen | 324 episodes |
| 2002 | Daddy's Girl | Chris Cooper | TV film |
| 2003 | Serious & Organised | DC Jack Finn | All 6 episodes |
| 2003 | Family | Joey Cutler | All 6 episodes |
| 2003 | The Brides in the Bath | George Joseph Smith | TV film |
| 2004 | Where the Heart Is | Ian Thorpe | Episode: "Skin Deep" |
| 2004 | Can't Buy Me Love | Alan Harris | TV film |
| 2006 | Agatha Christie's Marple | Jackie Afflick | Episode: "Sleeping Murder" |
| 2006 | Love Lies Bleeding | Mark Terry | Both 2 episodes |
| 2008 | Heartbeat | Mick Revill | Episode: "Bully Boys" |
| 2010 | Waterloo Road | Mr. Kevin Burley (Ronan's Gangster Dad) | Episode: #6.5 |
| 2012 | Hustle | Harry Holmes | Episode: "Picasso Finger Painting" |
| 2012 | Celebrity Big Brother | Contestant | Series 10 |
| 2016 | Would I Lie To You? | Himself | Episode: 1 season 10 |
| 2016 | Brian Pern: 45 Years of Prog and Roll | Himself | 2 episodes |
| 2016 | Birds of a Feather | Vince | 2 episodes |
| 2017 | Murder in Successville | Himself | Episode: "A Murder in Ye Olde Successville" |
| 2017 | Father Brown | Dennis Nelson | Episode: "The Chedworth Cyclone" |
| 2018 | Eight Go Rallying: The Road to Saigon | Himself | All 4 Episodes |
| 2020 | The Kemps: All True | Martin Kemp | TV film |
| 2021 | McDonald & Dodds | Mick Elkins | Episode: "The Man Who Wasn't There" |
| 2022 | The Horne Section TV Show | Himself | Episode 2 |
| 2023 | Murder, They Hope | John | Episode: "Blood Actually" |
| 2023 | The Kemps: All Gold | Himself | TV film |
| 2025 | I'm A Celebrity Get Me Out Of Here! | Contestant | Series 25; 7th Place |

=== As director ===
- Karma Magnet (2008) (short)
- Stalker (2010)
- Top Dog (2014)

== Bibliography ==
- Kemp, M. (2000). True: The Autobiography of Martin Kemp. Orion. ISBN 0-7528-3264-6.
- Kemp, Shirley; Kemp, Martin (2020). Shirlie and Martin Kemp: It's a Love Story. London: Mirror Books. ISBN 978-1913406363.

== See also ==
- List of Celebrity Big Brother (British TV series) housemates
