= Martin & Roman's Weekend Best! =

British television series

- Genre: Breakfast television Chat show
- Directed by: John Adams; Toby Baker
- Presented by: Martin Kemp; Roman Kemp
- Theme music composer: Harley Moon Kemp
- Country of origin: United Kingdom
- Original language: English
- No. of series: 2
- No. of episodes: 35

Production
- Executive producer: Amanda Ross
- Producers: Juliet Bacon; Kelly Weekes
- Editor: Neil Gooding
- Camera setup: Multiple-camera setup
- Running time: 55 minutes (inc. adverts)
- Production companies: Cactus TV (for ITV Breakfast)

Original release
- Network: ITV
- Release: 14 June 2020 – 29 May 2021

Martin & Roman's Weekend Best! (formerly Martin & Roman's Sunday Best!) is a British weekend breakfast programme broadcast on ITV, presented by father and son duo Martin and Roman Kemp. The series premiered on 14 June 2020. The programme combines celebrity interviews (both in and out-of-studio), musical performances and games while incorporating the participation of selected home viewers via video conference.

The programme returned following its successful first series on 17 April 2021, retitled as Weekend Best! to correspond with its airing on both Saturday and Sunday mornings.

== Format ==
Segments in-between the celebrity guest interviews are several games in which the hosts, celebrity guests, and families participate in:

- act it out - A game of musical charades between Team Martin and Team Roman with their celebrity guests.
- cover stars - Album covers are altered with Martin and Roman's faces while the guests aim to correctly name the artist and album title.
- guess the record - Roman has guests guess the No. 1 record "on this day" from yesteryear.
- kazoo-aoke - The two host-guest pairs attempt to perform songs on kazoos while the corresponding families guess the song title or lyrics.
- lyric maestro - The two teams try to guess the correct song based on the spoken lyrics.
- memories mixtape - Guests share songs that they associate with the given memory themes.
- our best picks! - Martin, Roman, and their guests recommend their favourite shows to binge-watch on various streaming platforms, including BritBox.

Title card as Martin & Roman's Sunday Best! (2020)

== Episodes ==
Series 1 (as Sunday Best!)

No.	Original release date	Guest(s)
1	14 June 2020	Ade Adepitan, Joel Dommett, Ricky Wilson
2	21 June 2020	Maya Jama, Robert Rinder, Michelle Visage
3	28 June 2020	Ella Henderson, Scarlett Moffatt
4	5 July 2020	Beverley Knight, Jessie Ware, Laura Whitmore
5	12 July 2020	Bill Bailey, Ella Eyre, Mark Wright
6	19 July 2020	Katherine Jenkins, Anne-Marie, Myles Stephenson
7	26 July 2020	James Bay, Phyllis Logan, Mica Paris
8	2 August 2020	Ronan Keating, Claire King, Nick Knowles
9	9 August 2020	Jake Humphrey, Jessica Johnson, Ranvir Singh, Stephen Tompkinson
10	16 August 2020	Danny Jones, Brad Simpson
11	23 August 2020	Sophie Ellis-Bextor, Stephen Mulhern, Denise Van Outen
12	30 August 2020	Luke Goss, Una Healy, Melvin Odoom
13	6 September 2020	Julia Goulding, Jay McGuiness, Ore Oduba
14	13 September 2020	Frankie Bridge, Russell Howard, Billy Ocean
15	20 September 2020	Russell Kane, Harley Moon Kemp, Shirlie Kemp, Caitlin Moran, Andrew Roachford
16	27 September 2020	Ben Miller, Jenny Ryan, Chris Stark
17	4 October 2020	Kirsty Gallacher, Delta Goodrem, Rufus Hound
18	11 October 2020	Rick Edwards, Konnie Huq, Katherine Parkinson
19	18 October 2020	Guvna B, James Haskell, Alex Horne
20	25 October 2020	Ben Hardy, Tamzin Outhwaite, Sara Pascoe
21	1 November 2020	Sara Dallin, Omid Djalili, Katie Melua, Craig Revel Horwood, Keren Woodward
22	8 November 2020	Jordan Banjo, James Blunt, Noel Fitzpatrick, Perri Kiely, Piers Morgan

Series 2 (as Weekend Best!)

No.	Original release date	Guest(s)
1	17 April 2021	Rick Edwards, Vick Hope
2	18 April 2021	Ainsley Harriott, Danny Jones, Michelle Visage
3	24 April 2021	Ben Cullen, Sara Pascoe, Tom Read Wilson
4	25 April 2021	Gabrielle, Gary Kemp, Big Narstie
5	1 May 2021	Rosie Jones, Catherine Tyldesley
6	2 May 2021	Anton Du Beke, Giovanna Fletcher, Lisa Riley
7	8 May 2021	Shane Richie, Suzi Ruffell
8	9 May 2021	Oti Mabuse, Jennie McAlpine, Ricky Wilson
9	15 May 2021	Scarlett Moffatt, Jordan North
10	16 May 2021	Joel Corry, Aljaz Skorjanec, Johnny Vegas
11	22 May 2021	Vernon Kay, James Newman, Melvin Odoom
12	23 May 2021	Sarah Hadland, Wes Nelson, Stephen Tompkinson
13	29 May 2021	Shirley Ballas, Sonny Jay

== See also ==
- List of television programmes broadcast by ITV
