= Why Britain is at War =

1939 book by Harold Nicolson

- Cover of reprint edition, based on November 1939 first edition
- Author: Harold Nicolson
- Language: English
- Series: Penguin Special S47
- Genre: Treatise; Propaganda
- Publisher: Penguin; Printer: Wyman and Sons Ltd
- Publication date: 7 November 1939
- Publication place: England
- Media type: Print (Paperback)
- Pages: 160 setting
- ISBN: 0141048964
- Preceded by: The Case for Federal Union by W. B. Curry (S46)
- Followed by: The Penguin Political Dictionary by Walter Theimer (S48)

Why Britain is at War is a polemic treatise written by Harold Nicolson and first published by Penguin Books on 7 November 1939 shortly after the Second World War began. In the book, Nicolson explores Adolf Hitler's insatiable grasp for power, the foreign policy brinkmanship and deception ploys adopted by Nazi Germany, and Hitler's use of actual and implied force to get his way at the negotiation table. The Penguin Special edition originally cost 6d (six old English pennies) and sold a hundred thousand copies.

== Harold Nicolson ==
At the time of writing, Nicolson was National Labour member of parliament (MP) for Leicester West. Nicolson had been among the few MPs to raise questions in the House of Commons about the threat of fascism.

== Origin of book ==
On 25 September 1939, Allen Lane, the founder of Penguin Books, commissioned Nicolson to write a Penguin Special of 50,000 words to present to the British people the reasons why they were at war with Germany, and why it was so crucial to defeat Nazism.

The book quickly became a bestseller and sold 100,000 copies and had three reprints by February 1940. Anthony Eden wrote to Nicolson that he was "very much in favour of my Penguin and has bought many copies".

Using high irony, low sarcasm and the telling phrase Nicolson sought to ensure the public were fully aware of the threat of Nazism during the Phoney War between the fall of Poland in October 1939 and the German invasions of Denmark and Norway in April 1940.

== Book outline ==
By initially introducing the story of murderer George Joseph Smith, Nicolson quickly compares the methods and strategies adopted by Hitler to force Britain and France to accede to his demands for territory, including the Rhineland, Austria, Czechoslovakia and later Poland.

Nicolson provides details on Hitler's early life and also critically reviews Mein Kampf. Separate chapters deal with each of the territorial claims being made by Nazi Germany – starting with the seizure of the Rhineland in March 1936, through the forced Anschluss for Austria in March 1938, the foreign policy issues surrounding the Munich Agreement between March and September 1938, the seizure of Czechoslovakia in March 1939 and then the invasion of Poland on 1 September 1939.

The book concludes with a review of the main causes for the outbreak of the war and suggestions as to its aims and purposes.
