= Charles Willie Mathews =

British barrister

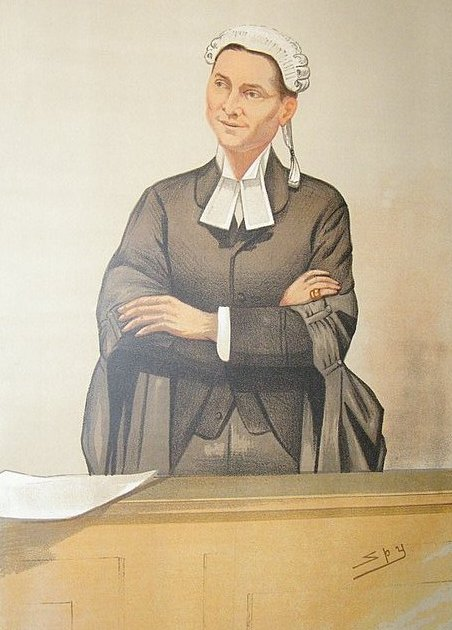
Charles Willie Mathews by 'Spy' in Vanity Fair (1892)

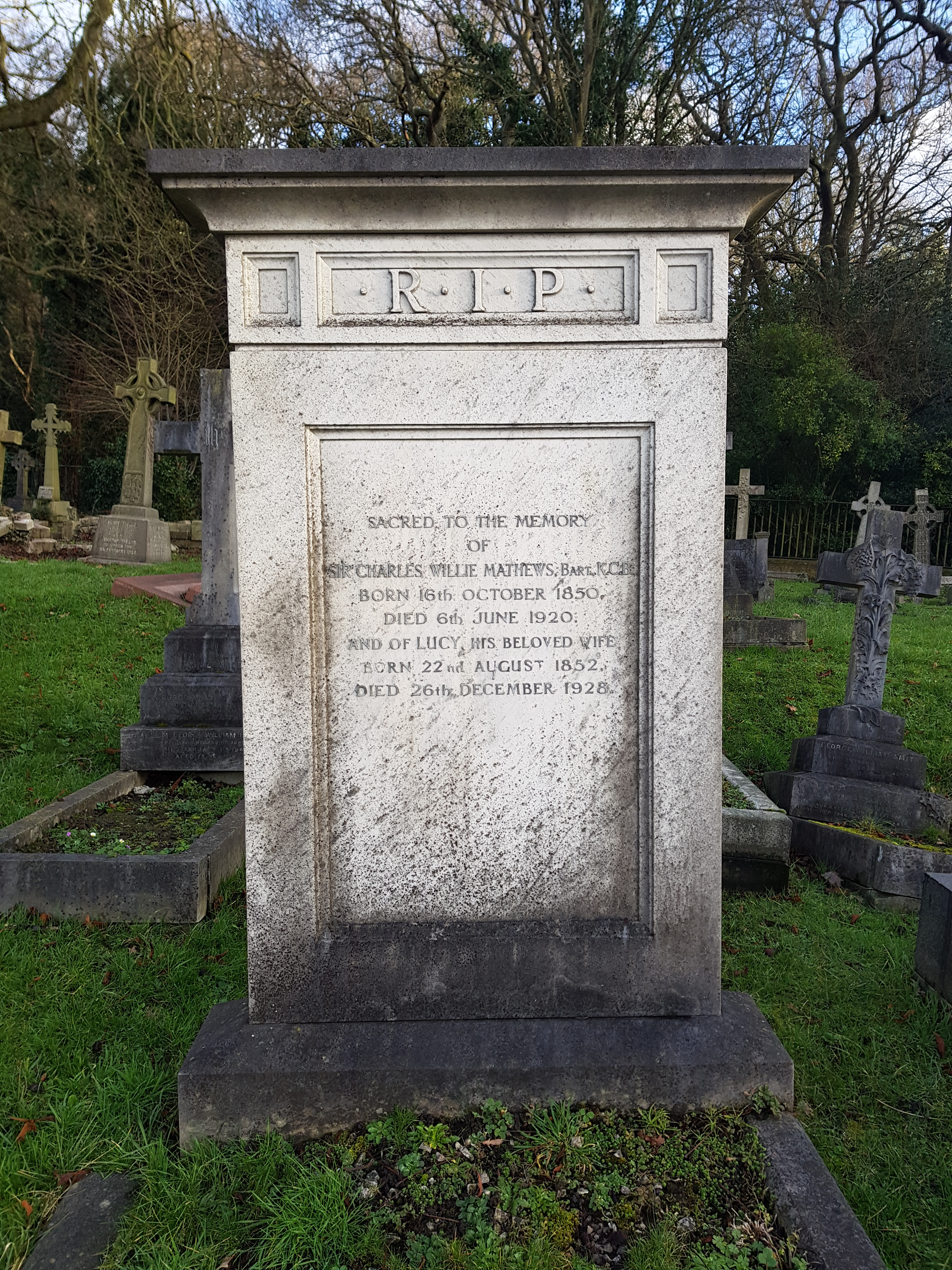
Grave of Mathews and his wife at Putney Vale Cemetery

Sir Charles Willie Mathews, 1st Baronet, KCB (16 October 1850 – 6 June 1920), familiarly known as Willie Mathews, was a British barrister.

He was born Charles Willie West in New York City, the son of actress Elizabeth Jackson (stage name Lizzie Weston; d.1899) and her first husband William West. Lizzie Weston married, as her third husband, the actor Charles James Mathews in 1857, one day after divorcing her second husband, A. H. Davenport (1831–1873). Charles Willie assumed his stepfather's surname by deed poll.

He was educated at Eton College, and after spending three years in Europe he joined the chambers of Montagu Williams as a pupil aged about twenty-one. In 1886, Williams retired as junior counsel to HM Treasury. The post was split into two and Mathews was appointed to one of the vacant offices. Two years later he was promoted to Senior Treasury Counsel, and in the same year he married Lucy Sloper but they had no children.

Mathews appeared in several infamous cases, including R. v. Dudley and Stephens, Oscar Wilde's suit for libel against John Douglas, 9th Marquess of Queensberry and Lord Colin Campbell's divorce proceedings. He prosecuted the Jameson Raiders, Arthur Alfred Lynch, and Louise Masset, who murdered her own son at Dalston Junction railway station. He successfully prosecuted Kitty Byron for the murder of her lover Arthur Reginald Baker in 1902. Mathews was famous for his courtroom flair and aggressive advocacy. A court reporter who often saw him in action was journalist Bernard Falk (1882-1960).

The Old Bailey interested me most when Sir Charles Mathews was present as Crown Prosecutor. Then, the atmosphere was as tense and emotional as that of a playhouse in which some moving drama was being staged. Indeed, the crowd were tempted to treat the court as a theatre, and among the many notabilities of the day present famous actors predominated.

Mathews was very sociable; he was a member of the Turf, Garrick, and Beefsteak Clubs, and was a friend of King Edward VII and King George V. In the 1892 United Kingdom general election, he was the Liberal candidate for Winchester, but was not returned. The following year, he was appointed recorder of Salisbury. He was knighted in 1907, and was the first independent Director of Public Prosecutions from 1908 until his death, despite ill health. He was created a baronet in 1917.

He was buried in Putney Vale Cemetery.

Preceded by Lord Desart	Director of Public Prosecutions; 1908–1920	Succeeded by Archibald Bodkin
