= Archibald Bodkin =

English lawyer (1862–1957)

Sir Archibald Bodkin c.1931

Sir Archibald Henry Bodkin KCB (1 April 1862 – 31 December 1957) was an English lawyer and the Director of Public Prosecutions from 1920 to 1930. He particularly took a stand against the publication of what he saw as 'obscene' literature.

== Early life and education ==
Bodkin was born in St Pancras, Middlesex, into a noted legal family, the son of William Peter Bodkin and Elizabeth Clowser, and grandson of judge and politician Sir William Henry Bodkin. His father succeeded his own father as chairman of the old Middlesex Sessions and of the Highgate Bench. He was also the nephew of Sir Harry Bodkin Poland, "the greatest criminal lawyer of his day." He was educated at Cholmeley School in Highgate.

After completing his schooling, it was originally intended that he should join his brother on a South African farm; to this end, he spent a year working on a farm near Barnsley. However, he had already expressed a wish to become a barrister, and so when the South African idea could not be organised, he entered the Inner Temple, and was called to the Bar in 1885.

== Career ==
Bodkin soon established a reputation as a hard and meticulous worker, and was particularly noted for his preparation of indictments—prior to the Indictments Act 1915 this was a highly specialised field. He disdained the theatrical devices popular amongst other barristers of the day; his style was built on a solid appreciation of the facts of the case. He virtually always appeared for the prosecution, and whilst determined to secure convictions, did not over-press a weak case. He rarely took holidays, and in addition to his prosecuting work, he built up a reputation in licensing law. These cases were usually held in a separate legal term, in August, so this did not interfere with his regular work.

On 8 July 1891, he married Maud Beatrice Bush, whose father, Robert Wheler Bush was vicar of St Alphage London Wall. The following year he was appointed a "Treasury devil" at the Old Bailey and rapidly established a reputation as a leading prosecutor. On 1 July 1901 he was also appointed Recorder (a part-time judge) of the Borough of Dover (succeeding his uncle, Sir Harry Bodkin Poland).

During the First World War he undertook many prosecutions of spies, in particular that of Carl Hans Lody, and was also heavily involved in building the case against Roger Casement. The wartime period also included his leading role in prosecuting the "Brides in the bath" case, which saw him calling 112 witnesses for the Crown. He was knighted in 1917.

In 1920, he replaced Sir Charles Mathews as Director of Public Prosecutions, this required him to resign as Recorder. In the 1920s he tried to ban Ulysses by James Joyce and even threatened in 1922 to prosecute the academic F. R. Leavis if he mentioned it in his lectures at Cambridge University since it contained "a great deal of unmitigated filth and obscenity". On 29 December 1922 he banned the book, saying "As might be supposed I have not had the time, nor may I add the inclination to read through this book. I have, however, read pages 690 to 732." He also stated he could not make "head nor tail" of the book. The British ban remained until 1936. In the 1924 King's Birthday Honours he was appointed a Knight Commander of the Order of the Bath (KCB).

He also successfully opposed the 1928 lesbian novel by Radclyffe Hall, The Well of Loneliness, and attempted to find an expert who would tell a court of:

the results to those unfortunate women (as I deem them) who have proclivities towards lesbianism, or those wicked women (as I deem them) who voluntarily indulge in these practices—results destructive morally, physically and even perhaps mentally.

Eventually, Sir William Henry Willcox gave evidence for the government and the book was not released until 1949. He also opposed the publication of D. H. Lawrence's poem Pansies.

He was known for working long hours and was reputed to examine over 2,000 sets of case papers each year, and was once seen working on Christmas Day. He continued to draft indictments that would normally be delegated to junior counsel.

His time as DPP was not without controversy. In 1924 he began the prosecution of John Campbell, acting editor of Workers' Weekly, using the Incitement to Mutiny Act 1797. The collapse of the case led to the fall of the first Labour government to have held office in the United Kingdom since it was seen as evidence of communist influence on Labour Party politicians. Fortunately for Bodkin, the Attorney-General, Sir Patrick Hastings, took responsibility for the failure of the case. However, the events of 1928 were entirely of Bodkin's making. The affair began with the acquittal in the magistrates' court of Sir Leo Chiozza Money and Irene Savidge on charges of indecent behaviour. This led to an investigation into possible perjury charges against the police officers who had arrested them. However, the investigation, led by Bodkin, turned into more of a re-examination of Money and Savidge, and he was particularly criticised for a lengthy interrogation of Savidge at New Scotland Yard on 15 May 1928. Questions were asked in Parliament, and although both the police and Bodkin were exonerated by the Home Secretary, the case raised important questions about the extent of the roles of police and the DPP.

In March 1930 he suddenly resigned, clearing his office the same day he announced his resignation. He was succeeded as DPP by Sir Edward Tindal Atkinson. Bodkin was then re-appointed Recorder of Dover on 9 February 1931, and continued to carry out the role until 1947, when he finally resigned at the age of 85. After resigning as DPP, he made his home at Sidmouth, and he was also appointed chairman of the Devon Quarter Sessions, holding this appointment also until the age of 85. He also became a well-known gardener. He retired to Rogate in Sussex, and died there on 31 December 1957.

== Notable trials ==
- George Joseph Smith—Brides in the Bath murderer
- George Chapman—possible suspect for the Jack the Ripper murders
- Arthur Devereux—hanged in August 1905 for the murder of his wife and two of his children
- John Starchfield— a case lost; Starchfield was accused of murdering his own son, but acquitted on 1 April 1914, from a Daily Sketch poster See also Mark Bostridge, The Fateful Year. England 1914, 2014.
- Madanlal Dhingra—murderer of Sir William Curzon Wyllie
- Amelia Sach and Annie Walters—The Baby Farmers
- Frederick Guy Browne and William Kennedy – in which Kennedy provided a confession which implicated Browne, and Bodkin then refused to allow him to turn King's Evidence and both men were hanged.

== In popular culture ==
He was played by Stephen Murray in one episode of the 1981 series Lady Killers. In 2003 he was played by James Woolley in The Brides in the Bath.

Virginia Woolf (1882-1941), refers to him in A Room of One's Own (1929).

Preceded by Sir Charles Mathews	Director of Public Prosecutions; 1920–1930	Succeeded by Sir Edward Tindal Atkinson
