= Human rights in Somaliland =

Human rights in Somaliland are protected by Chapter one, Part three of the Constitution of Somaliland. Somaliland is a partially recognized sovereign state in the Horn of Africa, internationally considered to be part of Somalia.

Amnesty International criticizes the persistence of the death penalty and cases of controversial detentions and trials in Somaliland.

In January 2007, the editor and several journalists of the Haatuf newspaper were arrested because they had "defamed" the president's family with their corruption allegations. Under pressure from Somalilander expats and local media, the government released the journalists after 86 days in custody. Other journalists dealing with corruption were also victims of intimidation.

Asylum seekers from the Ethiopian regions of Somali and Oromia, who are suspected of supporting the separatist Ogaden National Liberation Front (ONLF) or the Oromo Liberation Front, have been repatriated to Ethiopia at the request of the Ethiopian government. According to human rights organizations, these people are at risk of arbitrary detention and torture. However, this order was not carried out.

As of 2009, Freedom House names the following human rights problems in Somaliland: corruption, interference and harassment of journalists, banning non-Islamic proselytizing, banning public demonstrations, lack of due process and prolonged detention before trial, weak judiciary and female genital mutilation.

== Women's rights ==
In 2016, an estimated 98 percent of girls experienced female genital mutilation (FGM), and in 2020, the Somaliland Demographic and Health Survey reported a similar statistic, that 98 percent of women aged 15-49 had experienced FGM.

After activism from the Minister of Employment, Social Affairs & Family (MESAF), President Muse Bihi Abdi approved the signing of the Somaliland National Anti-FGM Policy on 18 September 2024.

== Freedom of expression ==
It is forbidden in Somaliland to promote the unity of Somaliland with Somalia, or to wear the flag of Somalia.

== Notable activists ==
- Amina Warsame - Executive director of Nagaad, a women's group in Hargeisa
- Edna Adan Ismail - Director and founder of the Maternity Hospital and an activist for the abolition of female genital mutilation.
- Hibo Aden Diriye - a Somaliland humanitarian, protection specialist, and women's rights officer.
- Lul Hassan Matan - Helping street children, women, and minority communities in Somaliland.
- Mariam Dahir - Doctor, researcher and anti-female genital mutilation activist.
- Nimco Ali - Co-founder and CEO of The Five Foundation, a global partnership to end female genital mutilation (FGM).
- Rakiya Omaar - First reported on the Isaaq genocide and Rwandan genocide.
- Ubah Ali - Advocate against female genital mutilation. Listed by the BBC as one of the world's most influential 100 Women.
