= Warsame =

- Pronunciation: War-sa-meh
- Gender: Male
- Language: Somali

Origin
- Meaning: good news, bearer of good news

Other names
- Variant forms: Warsama, Wersame

Warsame (Somali: Warsame, Arabic: ورسمي) is a traditional Somali name meaning bearer of good news. 'War' translates into news and 'same' (bearer of good) into positivity or good in Somali. The equivalent name for girls is Warsan which means 'good news" (as name it means "she who brings good news")

== Given name ==
- Warsame Abdi Shirwa, former Minister of Information of Puntland region of Somalia
- Warsame Shire Awale (1951–2012), Somali poet and playwright
- Warsama Hassan Houssein, Djiboutian professional footballer

== Surname ==
- Amina Warsame, Somali social scientist
- Abdirahman Abdishakur Warsame, Somali politician
- Abdi Shire Warsame, Somali diplomat who was the former Somali Ambassador to Iran and Kenya
- Abdi Warsame, Somali American member-elect of the Minneapolis City Council
- Abdi Warsame Isaq, former chairman of the Southern Somali National Movement (SSNM)
- Ahmed Warsame, the Head of the former Somali Military Academy and Somali National Front
- Ahmed Abdulkadir Warsame, Somali prisoner of the United States
- Ali Shire Warsame, Somali politician, General Surgeon and businessman
- Ali Haji Warsame, Somali entrepreneur, accountant, and politician
- Ibrahim Mursal, Norwegian film director of Sudanese and Somali origins
- K'naan (Keinan Abdi Warsame), Somali-Canadian rapper
- Mohamed Ibrahim Warsame 'Hadrawi', Somali poet and songwriter
- Mohamed Warsame Ali, Somali politician and diplomat
- Mohammed Abdullah Warsame (born 1973), Somali born Canadian citizen and suspected terrorist arrested in 2003 by American police
- Nur Warsame, Somali-Australian gay imam
- Saado Ali Warsame, Somali-American singer-songwriter and politician
- Yasmin Warsame (born 1976), Somali-Canadian model
- Yusuf Warsame Saeed, Somali politician
