= Scarlett Curtis =

English activist and writer (born 1995)

- Born: Scarlett Kate Freud Curtis; 21 June 1995 (age 31); London, England
- Citizenship: United Kingdom
- Occupation: Writer
- Parents: Richard Curtis (father); Emma Freud (mother)
- Relatives: Freud family
- Writing career
- Notable works: Feminists Don't Wear Pink & Other Lies
- Notable awards: Young Adult Book of the Year 2018; National Book Award
- Website: scarlettcurtis.com

Scarlett Kate Freud Curtis (born 21 June 1995) is an English activist and writer.

== Biography ==
Curtis was born on 21 June 1995 in London. She is the daughter of screenwriter Richard Curtis and broadcaster Emma Freud, and she is also a great-great-granddaughter of Austrian neurologist Sigmund Freud. In 2003, she made a brief cameo in her father's film Love Actually, playing Lobster Number 2 in the school nativity concert. She began her career as a blogger and has written for The Guardian, Elle magazine, The Times and The Telegraph. Curtis was the Sunday Times Style 'Gen-Z' columnist from 2016 to 2018.

== Activism ==
In 2017, Curtis founded feminist activist collective The Pink Protest. The Pink Protest and Amika George organised the #FreePeriods campaign to fight period poverty. They have also campaigned with anti-female genital mutilation activist Nimco Ali and The Five Foundation to successfully include female genital mutilation in the Children Act (1989).

Appearing on Good Morning Britain in 2018 together with fiction author Adele Parks, Curtis suggested that Disney films and fairy tales should be rewritten, saying that they represent an "unrealistic expectation" of life and that Aladdin was racist. Parks disagreed with Curtis on the show, saying that she "wouldn’t want our history rewritten."

Curtis, writing in the BBC about whether feminism is done, answers that in order for that to happen, the future needs to be female, with boys in skirts, and girls in spaceships, and that activists are "dreaming up and writing [this] into reality every day".

== Publications ==
In 2018, Curtis curated the Penguin anthology Feminists Don't Wear Pink & Other Lies, a collection of essays by 52 women on what feminism means to them, featuring essays by Keira Knightley, Alaa Murabit, Saoirse Ronan and others. All royalties from the book went to the United Nations Foundation charity Girl Up. Feminists Don't Wear Pink & other lies became a Sunday Times bestseller for two consecutive weeks after publication. The book also won the 2018 National Book Award for Young Adult Book of the Year and was nominated for a 2019 British Book Award. The book hit national headlines when Topshop proprietor Sir Philip Green dismantled a promotional display in the branch at Oxford Circus, London. Curtis launched the hashtag #PinkNotGreen following the event. She is also the host of the Feminists Don't Wear Pink podcast.

In October 2021, it was reported that an anthology television show based on the book and titled Girls Can't Shoot (& Other Lies) will be produced by Mark Gordon Pictures and executive produced by Curtis and Saoirse Ronan. The announced cast includes Beanie Feldstein, Michaela Jaé Rodriguez, Kat Dennings, Jameela Jamil and Lolly Adefope.

In 2019, Curtis curated the Penguin anthology It's Not OK to Feel Blue & Other Lies, a collection of essays by 74 people on what mental health means to them. In November 2019, Curtis was presented with the second annual Changemaker Award for young activists by Equality Now.

== Recognition ==
She was recognised as one of the BBC's 100 women of 2019.
