= Timeline of Partygate =

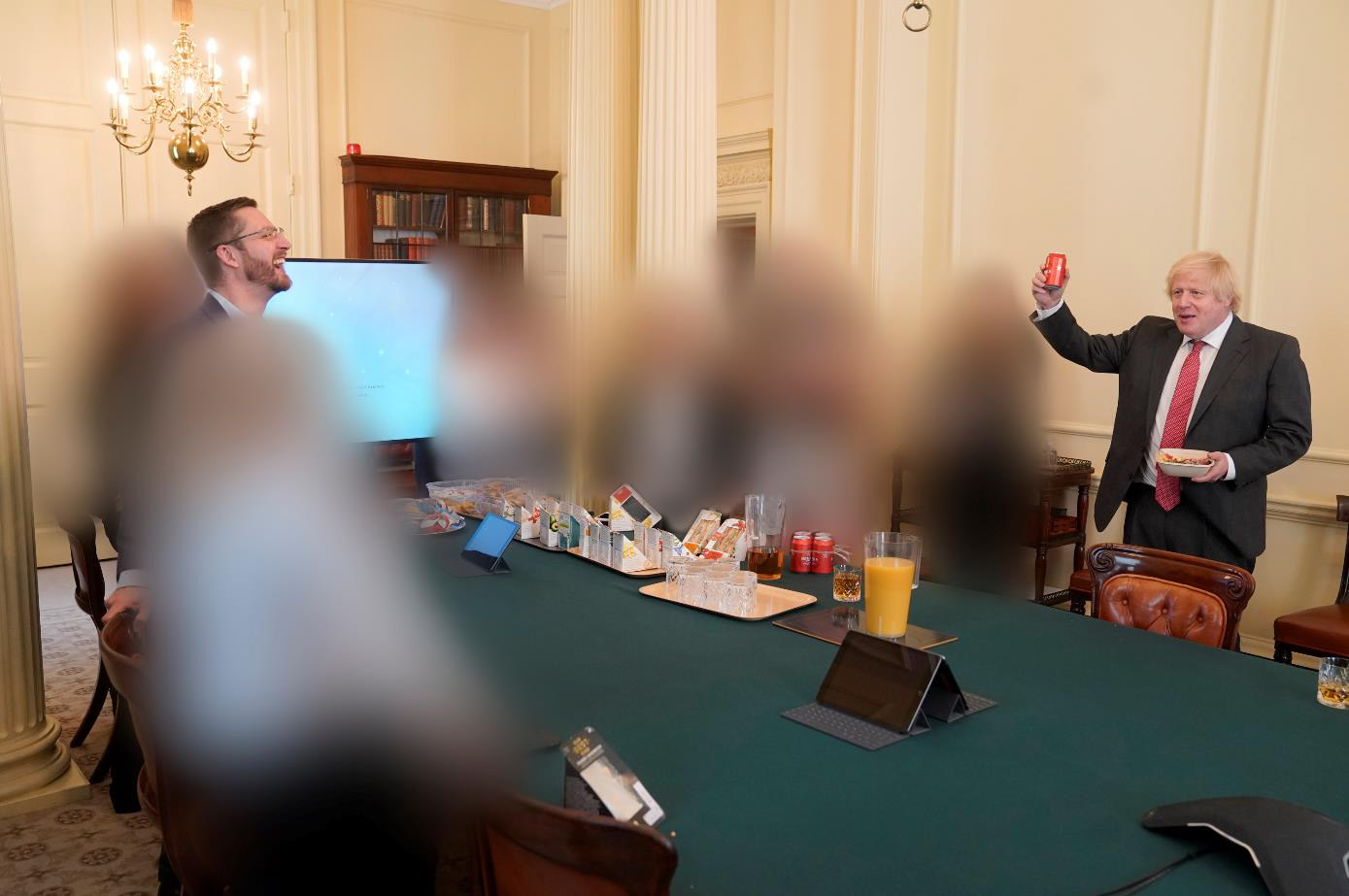
The Partygate scandal contributed to the fall of the premiership of Boris Johnson (right).

Partygate was a political scandal in the United Kingdom about gatherings of government and Conservative Party staff during the COVID-19 pandemic in 2020 and 2021, at a time when such events were prohibited by public health restrictions. The first COVID-19 death in the UK occurred on 5 March 2020; 18 days later, the death toll reached 335. In response, Prime Minister Boris Johnson announced that the UK would go into a full lockdown, with new restrictions on gathering socially with people from different households. As the pandemic continued, the rules for socialising evolved: on 16 September, the government introduced a new "rule of six" in England, whereby groups of more than six people were banned from meeting, and, the following month, Johnson unveiled new "three-tier" regulations, with London being placed in the "medium" tier 1 restrictions. Lockdown rules in England continued in some form until 19 July 2021, at which point almost all of them were lifted.

Despite these new regulations, social gatherings continued to take place in Downing Street and Whitehall "most Fridays", including some that were attended by the Prime Minister. In May, a cheese and wine party and a bring your own beer (BYOB) event were held in the Downing Street garden. On Johnson's 56th birthday in June, a surprise party was thrown for him in the Cabinet Office, with a second party in his flat later that evening. In December, various Christmas parties were thrown, including one in the Downing Street Press Office on 18 December that involved a Secret Santa and an awards ceremony. Two leaving dos were held on 16 April 2021, the eve of the funeral of Prince Philip.

News articles about these events began to appear in late 2021, with the majority of them published by Pippa Crerar, the political editor of the Daily Mirror, and Paul Brand, UK editor of ITV News. The story was first broken under Crerar's byline on 30 November 2021, with details of three parties. Seven days later, a video showing the Press Secretary Allegra Stratton joking about the Christmas party in the Downing Street Press Office was broadcast by ITV News. Speaking in Parliament the following day, Johnson said that he was sickened and furious to see the clip, but that "the guidance was followed and the rules were followed at all times".

As details of the parties continued to be revealed in news stories throughout 2021 and 2022, investigations into them were announced. In December 2021, an inquiry led by the civil servant Sue Gray was started. Gray's completed report, published in May 2022, criticised the senior leadership at both Downing Street and the Cabinet Office, and said that they must bear responsibility for "failures of leadership and judgment". In January 2022, a criminal investigation into breaches of lockdown rules at Downing Street was launched by the Metropolitan Police. As a result of the operation, 126 fixed penalty notices were issued, including one to Johnson for attending his surprise birthday party, making him the first serving prime minister to be found to have broken the law. Johnson subsequently resigned as prime minister on 7 July 2022, and as a member of parliament (MP) the following year.

== Lockdown parties ==
=== 2020 ===
- 30 January: Two Chinese nationals staying at a hotel in York fall ill with the 2019 novel coronavirus and become its first cases in the UK.
- 5 March: A woman in her 70s becomes the first person in the UK to die from COVID-19.
- 23 March: With the UK death toll having reached 335, Prime Minister Boris Johnson announces in a televised address that the UK will go into a full lockdown. New rules mean that gatherings in public of three or more people who are not in the same household are prohibited.
- 12 April: The total number of deaths from COVID-19 in hospitals reaches 10,000.
- 5 May: The UK's death toll surpasses 32,000, overtaking Italy's as the highest in Europe.
- 13 May: Lockdown restrictions are eased for the first time. Under the new rules, people are allowed to meet one other member of another household in an outdoor public place.
- 15 May: In the garden of Downing Street, an early evening cheese and wine party is held, which is attended by Johnson, his wife Carrie, Health Secretary Matt Hancock, and up to 17 staff.

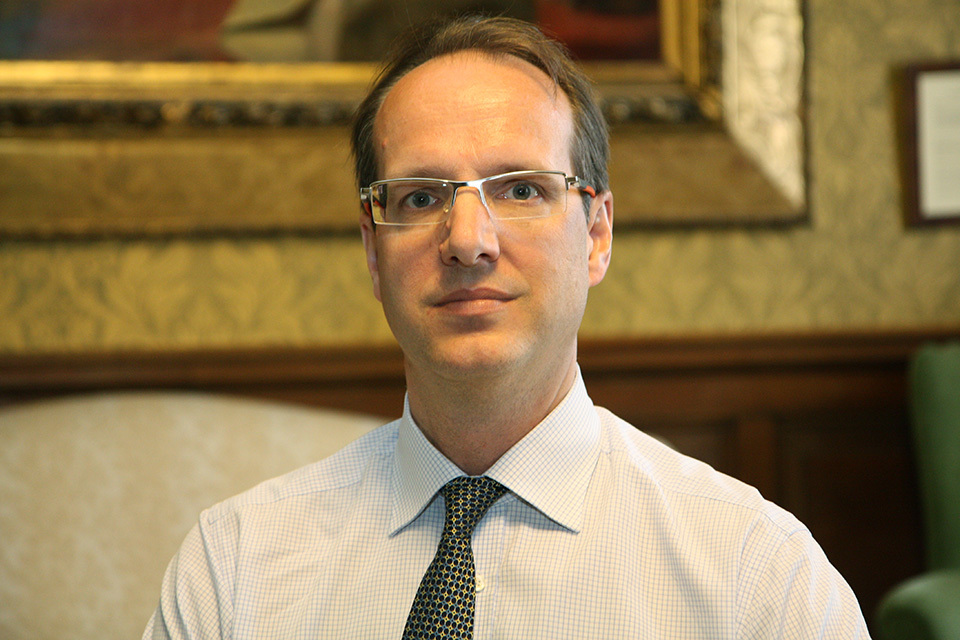
Martin Reynolds was the Principal Private Secretary to the Prime Minister from October 2019 until February 2022.

- 20 May: Martin Reynolds, Johnson's Principal Private Secretary, emails approximately 200 staff to invite them to "make the most of [the] lovely weather" and have some "socially distanced drinks" in the Downing Street garden. The email invites staff to attend from 6 p.m., and to "bring [their] own booze". Thirty to forty people attend, including Johnson for around half an hour.
- 1 June: Social distancing rules are eased again, with groups of up to six people now allowed to meet outside in parks or private gardens.
- 13 June: A "support bubble" scheme—in which single-person households are allowed to meet and stay overnight with another household—begins in England and Northern Ireland.
- 17 June: Emails are exchanged between Downing Street officials to prepare "drinks which aren't drinks" for the departure of private secretary Hannah Young the following day.
- 18 June: At 6:30 p.m., twenty-five people—including Simon Case, the Downing Street Permanent Secretary—gather in the Cabinet Room of 10 Downing Street for Young's leaving party, which begins with alcohol and speeches. At 7:40 p.m., the party then moves into the Cabinet Office, where it lasts until 3:13 a.m. One individual vomits, and a fight breaks out between two others.

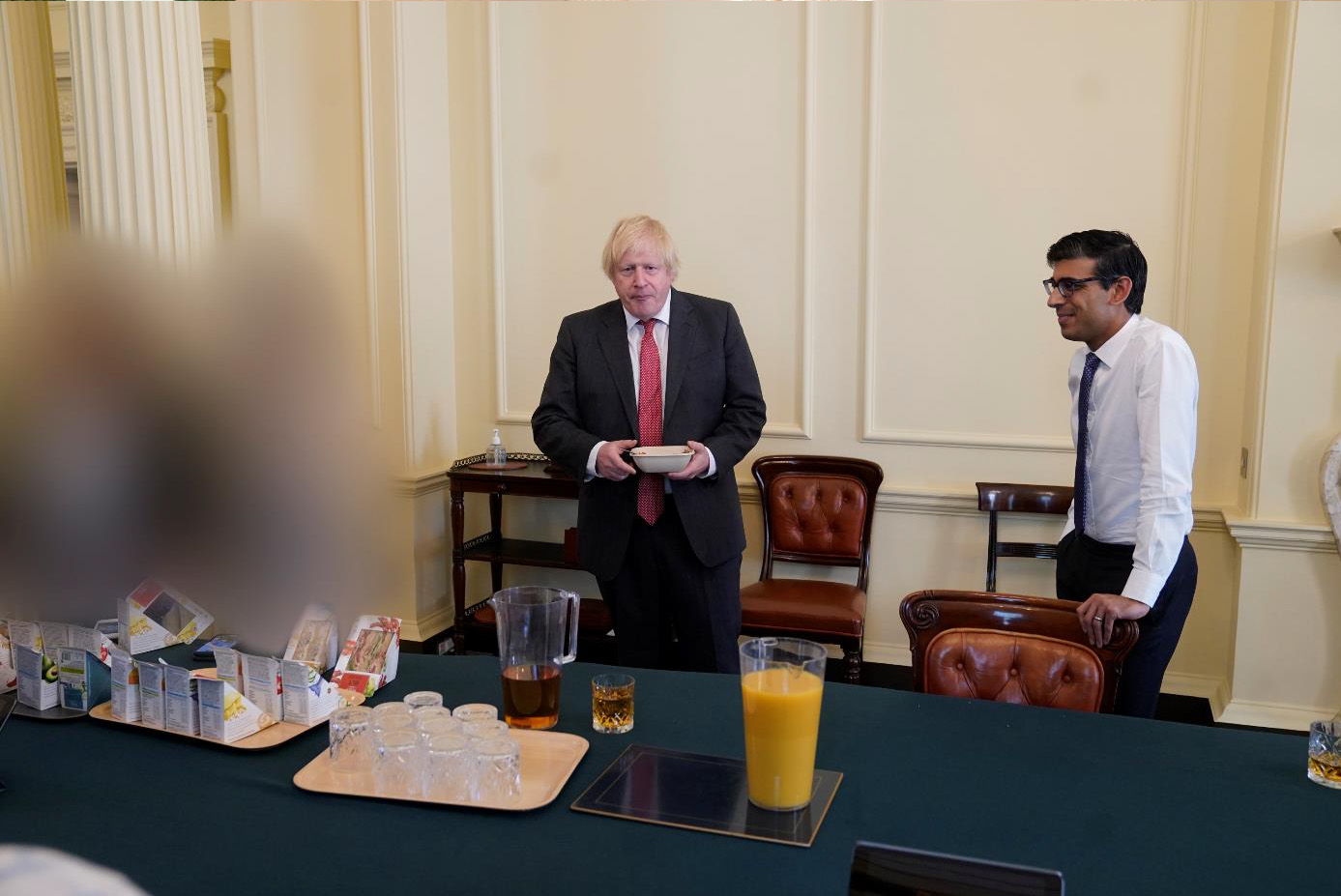
Johnson (left) with Chancellor of the Exchequer Rishi Sunak (right) at a surprise party for Johnson's birthday on 19 June 2020

- 19 June:
  - This is Johnson's 56th birthday. A surprise party is thrown for him at 2:25 p.m. in the Cabinet Office with sandwiches, beers and a cake. The event lasts for 20 minutes, and is attended by Case, Chancellor of the Exchequer Rishi Sunak, and up to 30 staff.
  - Carrie Johnson holds a second birthday gathering for her husband in their Downing Street flat that evening, with a number of friends.
- 14 September: To hinder a potential second wave of COVID-19 in the UK, the government restricts social gatherings again by implementing a new "rule of six" in England – groups of more than six people are banned from meeting in England, either indoors or outdoors.
- 12 October: With the number of COVID-19 cases having quadrupled in three weeks, Johnson unveils new "three-tier" regulations. London is placed in the "medium" tier 1 restrictions, which includes the rule of six.
- 17 October: London is moved into the "high" tier 2 restrictions. People living in London are banned from mixing indoors with those from other households.
- 31 October: Johnson announces that the UK will go into a second nationwide lockdown from 5 November. It will last four weeks, with household mixing banned across England.
- 5 November: The second full lockdown begins. People are told to remain at home, and socialising indoors is prohibited.
- 11 November: The UK becomes the first European country to record more than 50,000 deaths from COVID-19.

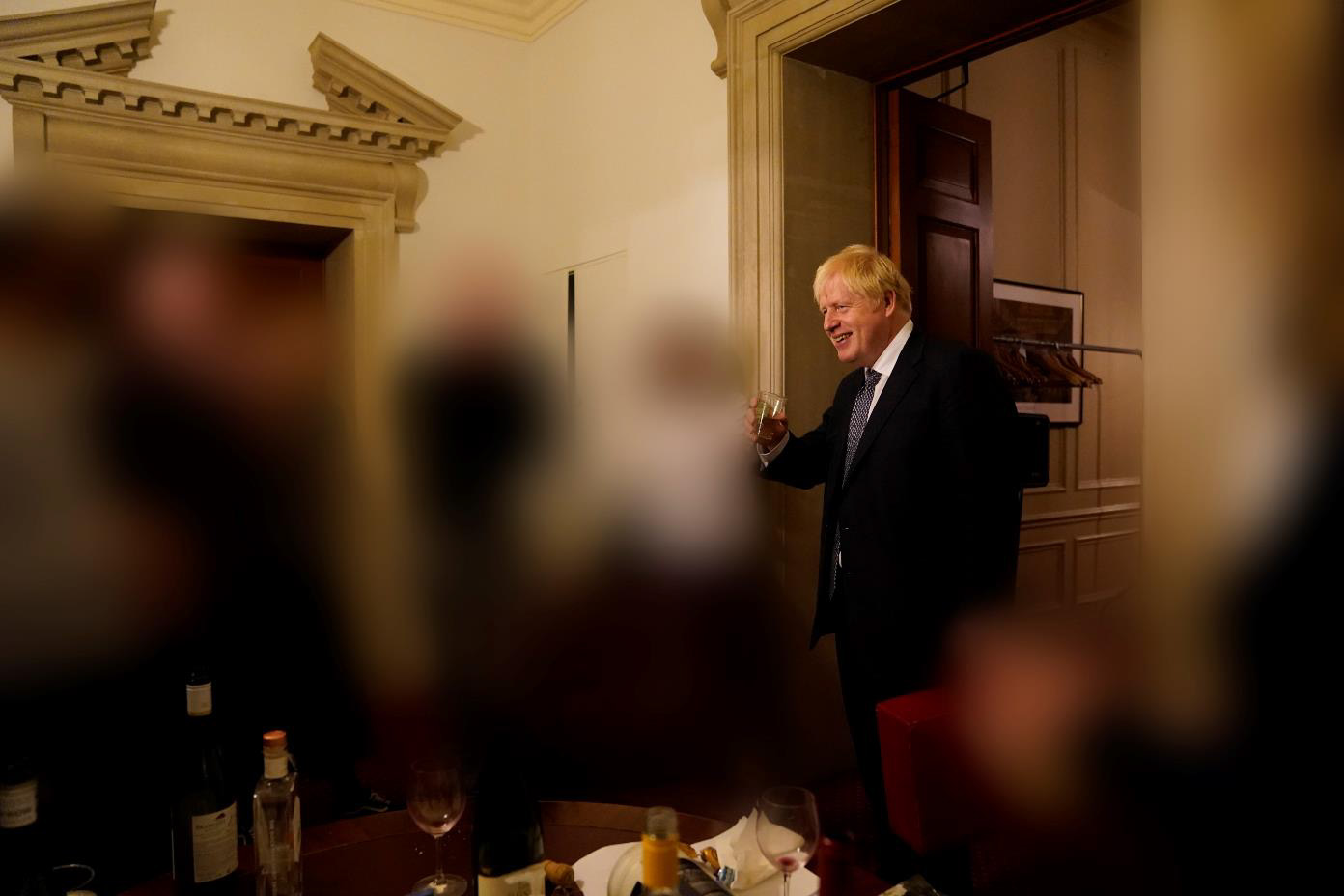
Johnson attending a leaving party in Downing Street on 13 November 2020

- 13 November:
  - A leaving do with food and alcohol is held at 6 p.m. in 10 Downing Street. Five special advisers attend, as does Johnson, who makes a speech.
  - In Johnson's flat above Downing Street, a party is held involving food, alcohol and loud music.
- 25 November:
  - The governments of the four nations of the UK agree to lift restrictions for a five-day period over Christmas, from 23 to 27 December.
  - Approximately two dozen civil servants attend a drinks party in HM Treasury to celebrate Sunak's spending review.
- 27 November: A leaving party is held at 6 p.m. for special adviser Cleo Watson. Fifteen to twenty people—including Johnson—attend, with some drinking alcohol.
- 2 December: As the four-week lockdown ends, London moves into tier 2 restrictions, with indoor household mixing banned.
- 7 December: At the Department for Education, 50 members of staff are invited to have "some 'socially distanced' festive drinks" in the department's canteen on 10 December.
- 10 December: The drinks—hosted by Gavin Williamson, the Education Secretary—are held in the canteen of the Department for Education. Between 20 and 30 people attend the gathering, which includes wine and mince pies, and lasts for an hour.
- 11 December: Johnson's staff bring a wine fridge through the back door of Downing Street.

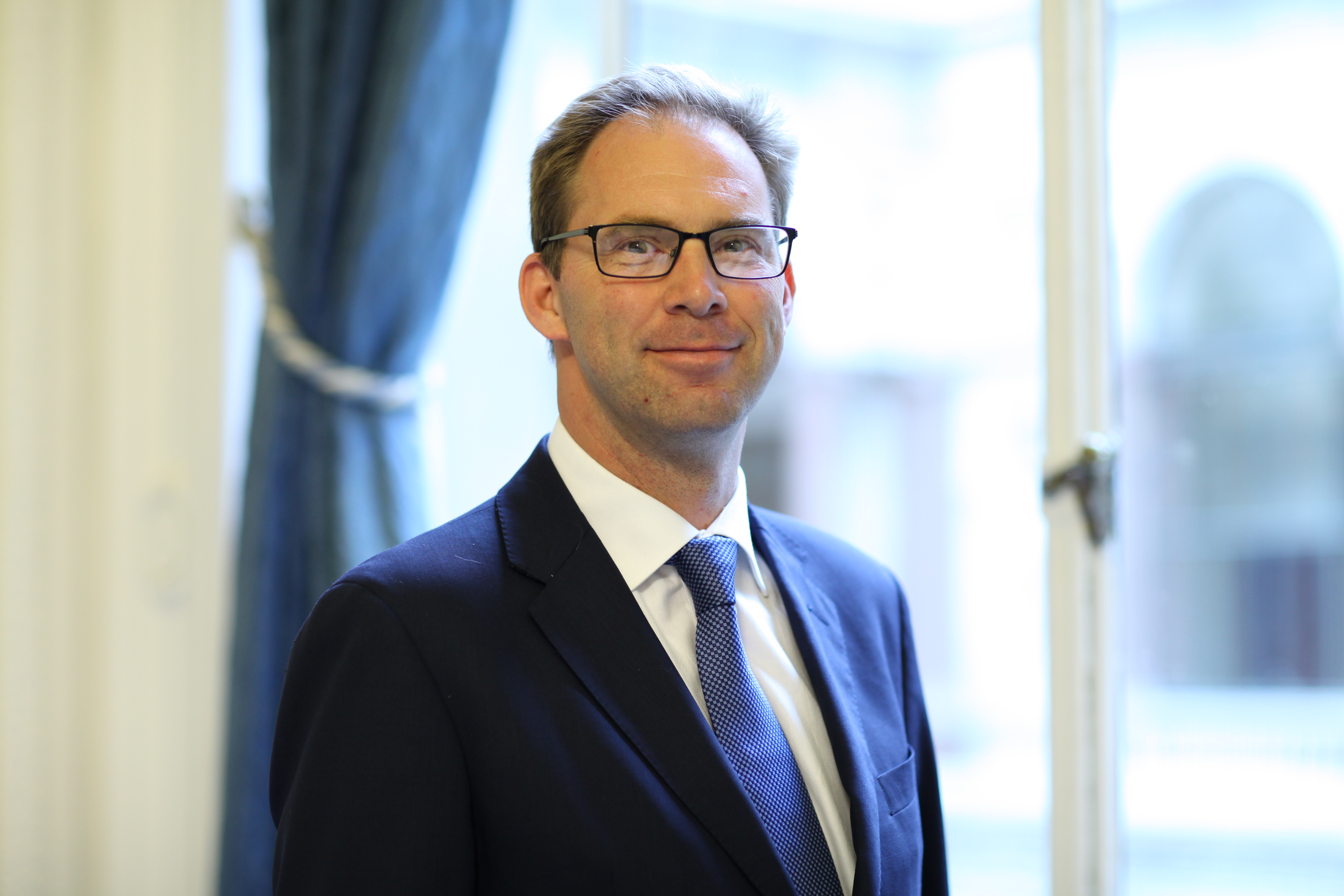
Tobias Ellwood was first elected to Westminster as the MP for Bournemouth East in May 2005.

- 14 December:
  - Speaking in the House of Commons, Tobias Ellwood—the Conservative MP for Bournemouth East—speaks out against relaxing the COVID restrictions for Christmas, saying that it "could be very dangerous indeed".
  - At a press conference, Hancock warns that the number of cases of COVID-19 has increased by 14 per cent in a week, and that "everyone should minimise their social contact" to control the spread of the virus.
  - A Christmas party—formally called a "Jingle and Mingle"—is held for the campaign staff of Shaun Bailey's candidacy for the 2021 London mayoral election. The gathering, held inside at the Conservative Campaign Headquarters, is attended by at least 24 people, including Bailey and Conservative aide Ben Mallett.
- 15 December:
  - Ellwood attends a Christmas party of 27 people at the Cavalry and Guards Club in Piccadilly.
  - A Christmas quiz is held at Downing Street. Most staff dial-in online from their homes, though four teams of six attend in person. Food and alcohol are provided, with one official, wary of "drunkenness", advising staff to leave by the back entrance.

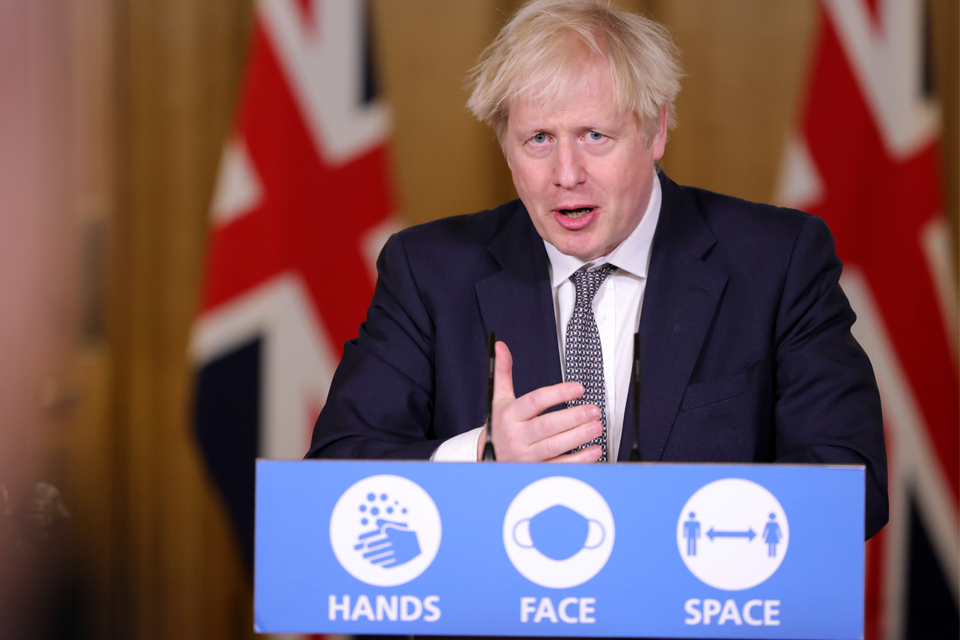
Johnson announcing that London will move into "very high" tier 3 restrictions on 16 December 2020

- 16 December:
  - With the number of cases in London at 270 per 100,000 people, Johnson announces at a press conference that the city will move into tier 3 restrictions with immediate effect.
  - A Christmas gathering is held for staff at the Department for Transport, with food and alcohol being served.
- 17 December:
  - The Daily Mail reports Ellwood's attendance at the Christmas party two days earlier. In a statement, the MP responds that the event was a "business meeting" and "absolutely COVID-compliant". Responding to the story in an interview with ITV News, Priti Patel, the Home Secretary, says that gathering "with a large number of people is a breach of the regulations".
  - A Christmas party is held for Case's staff at the Cabinet Office. Twelve staff attend online, but five join in the office, indoors. The event lasts for 90 minutes; food and alcohol are made available.
  - A leaving party is thrown for two Downing Street officials. Twenty people gather in the Pillared Room of 10 Downing Street from 6 p.m., with most leaving by 8:45 p.m. Johnson attends for 15 minutes and delivers a speech to thank both officials.
  - A second leaving do is held for Kate Josephs—a director-general in the COVID taskforce who had responsibility for writing the lockdown rules—and another unnamed official. Another twenty people attend from 7 p.m., with beer and prosecco provided.
- 18 December: A crowded Christmas party—formally named the "End of Year Meeting with Wine & Cheese"—takes place in the Downing Street Press Office. The event, which includes a Secret Santa and an awards ceremony, lasts for several hours, during which time a panic alarm button is accidentally triggered, causing a police officer and Downing Street's on-duty custodians to arrive.
- 19 December:
  - While cleaning the Press Office following the party the previous night, a Downing Street cleaner notes that red wine has been spilled "on one wall and on a number of boxes of photocopier paper".
  - Speaking at a press conference, Johnson says that the country "cannot continue with Christmas as planned", and announces that London and South East England have been placed in newly created tier 4 restrictions. Under these restrictions, households are not allowed to mix.

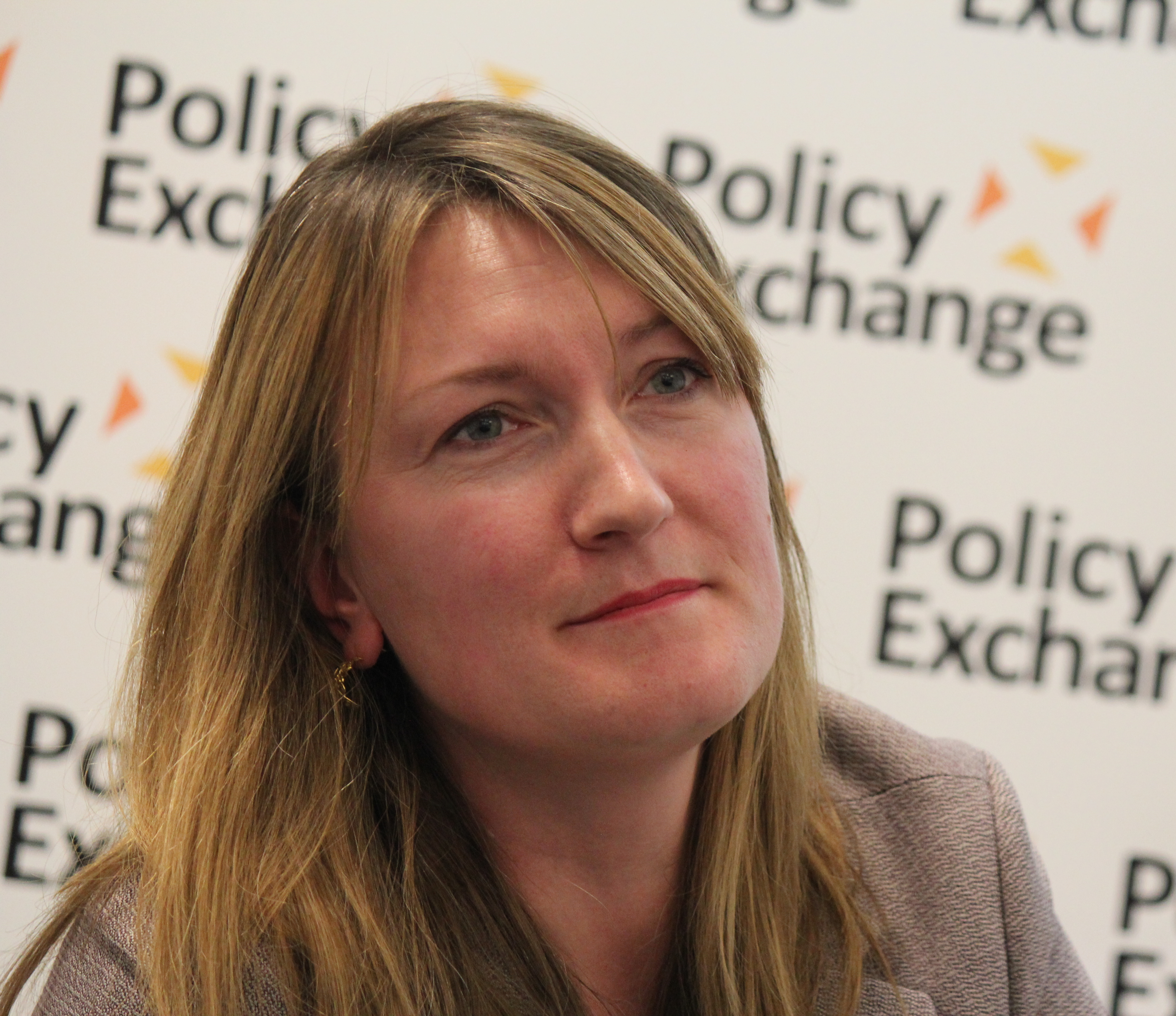
Allegra Stratton was Downing Street Press Secretary from October 2020 to April 2021.

- 22 December: In the Downing Street Press Briefing Room, Press Secretary Allegra Stratton, adviser Ed Oldfield and others hold a mock press conference to prepare Stratton for planned daily televised briefings. Over the course of the press conference, Oldfield asks Stratton if she recognises reports of a Christmas party held at Downing Street four days earlier. From the podium, Stratton laughingly responds that the party "was a business meeting and it was not socially distanced".
- 25 December: Nimco Ali, an adviser at the Home Office, spends Christmas with Johnson and his wife.

=== 2021 ===
- 4 January: In a televised address from Downing Street, Johnson announces that, from 6 January, England will enter a third national lockdown. Except for permitted exceptions, people are not allowed to leave their homes.
- 6 January: The third national lockdown begins.

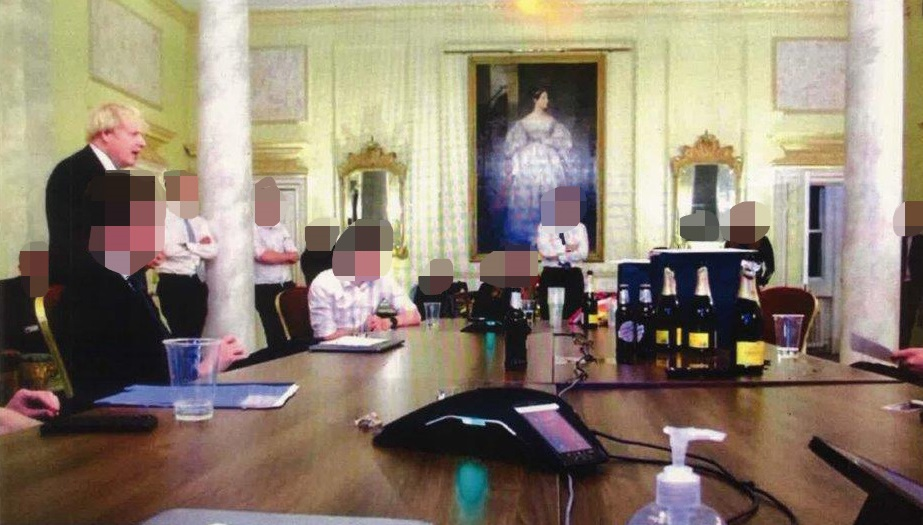
Johnson (left) and staff attending a leaving party on 14 January 2021

- 14 January: A "virtual leaving presentation" is held from 6 p.m. in the Pillared Room in Downing Street for two private secretaries. Around 15 people attend, with Johnson delivering a speech to mark their departures. The party continues until 11 p.m.
- 26 January: The UK becomes the first European nation to record over 100,000 deaths with COVID-19, according to the government's official figures.
- 8 March: A new "roadmap" out of lockdown comes into effect. Restrictions on socialising with others are eased, with people now allowed to have socially distanced one-on-one meetings outdoors.
- 9 April: At Windsor Castle, Prince Philip, the husband of Queen Elizabeth II, dies at the age of 99.
- 12 April: Lockdown rules are eased in England. Working from home continues to be recommended, and socialising indoors with people from other households remains prohibited.
- 16 April: Two leaving dos are held at Downing Street: one for James Slack, the Downing Street Director of Communications, and the other for one of Johnson's personal photographers. The party for Slack begins at 6:30 p.m. and is attended by 45 people in the Downing Street Press Office, while the second takes place in the basement. The two groups merge in the Downing Street garden, with drinking continuing until 4:20 a.m.
- 17 April:
  - Downing Street staff notice that, following the party in the garden the previous night, a swing set belonging to Johnson's son Wilfred has been damaged.
  - The funeral of Prince Philip is held at St George's Chapel, Windsor Castle. Observing social distancing rules, the Queen sits alone.
- 19 July: On a day dubbed "Freedom Day" by some media outlets, almost all lockdown restrictions in England are lifted.

== The story breaks ==
=== 2021 ===
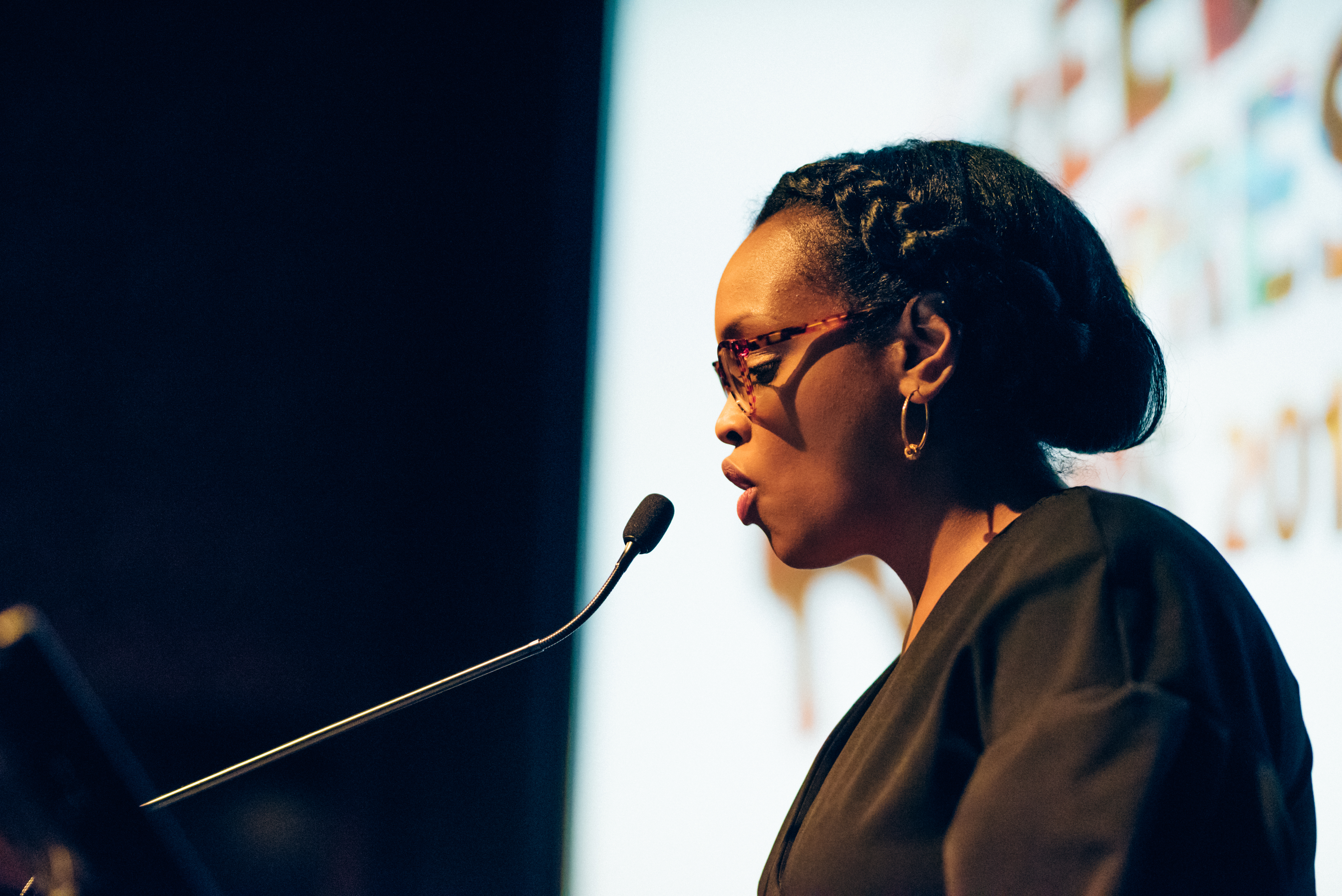
Reports that Nimco Ali had spent Christmas with the Johnsons in 2020 first appeared in Harper's Magazine.

- 18 October: An article in Harper's Magazine reports that Ali spent Christmas with the Johnsons at 10 Downing Street in 2020. A spokesperson for Johnson responds that "the prime minister and Mrs Johnson have followed coronavirus rules at all times".
- 30 November: Writing in the Daily Mirror, the paper's political editor, Pippa Crerar, reports on three of the gatherings that took place in Downing Street when London was under tier 3 restrictions in 2020: one of the leaving parties on 13 November, the leaving party for Watson on 27 November, and the Christmas party on 18 December. In response to Crerar's story, a spokesperson for Downing Street states that COVID rules were "followed at all times".
- 1 December:
  - Speaking to the Financial Times, an insider tells the paper that evening get-togethers "happened most Fridays" in Downing Street. Johnson's staff respond that they "don't recognise" this account, and that the rules were followed at "all stages".
  - In response to a question at Prime Minister's Questions (PMQs) from Keir Starmer, the leader of the opposition, on whether there was a Christmas party in Downing Street, Johnson reiterates that "all guidance was followed completely".
- 3 December: Johnson is reported to the Metropolitan Police by the Labour Party MPs Neil Coyle and Barry Gardiner, who ask them to investigate whether parties took place in Downing Street during lockdown restrictions.
- 4 December: The police respond to Coyle and Gardiner that they were "considering" the complaints, but that they do not normally investigate "retrospective breaches of the COVID-19 regulations".
- 5 December: Speaking on The Andrew Marr Show, Dominic Raab, the Deputy Prime Minister, tells Andrew Marr that "of course it would be wrong" if a party had taken place, but that the reports are based on "unsubstantiated, anonymous claims".
- 6 December: At the Christmas party for the think tank Institute of Economic Affairs, the leader of the House of Commons Jacob Rees-Mogg jokes about the scandal, sarcastically asking: "I see we're all here obeying regulations, aren't we?"

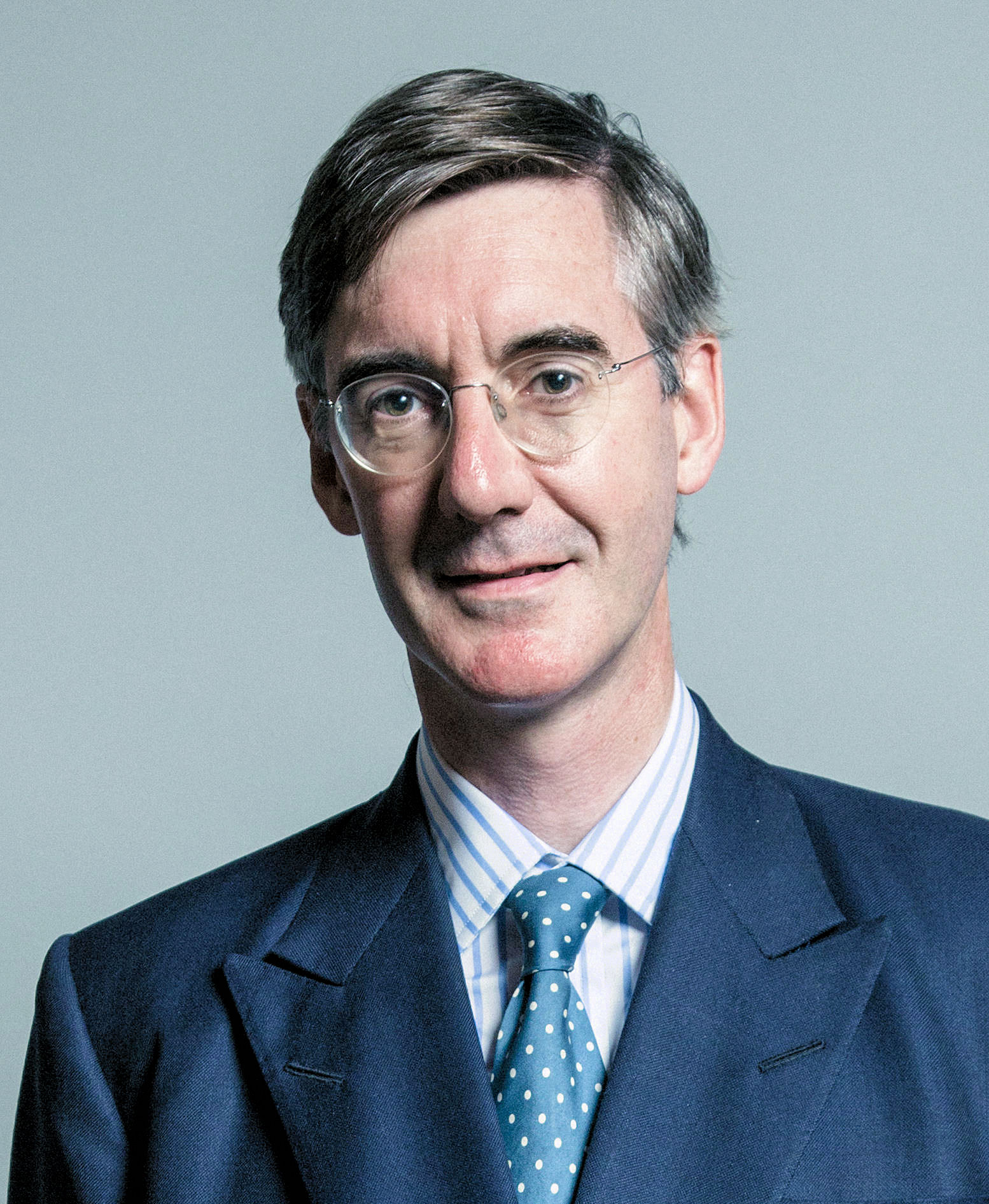
Footage of Jacob Rees-Mogg joking about the scandal was published on 7 December 2021.

- 7 December:
  - Footage of Rees-Mogg's remarks is published on the political blog Guido Fawkes.
  - ITV News broadcast a 47-second clip of Stratton and Oldfield joking about the Christmas party on 18 December 2020 at the mock press conference four days later. Downing Street responds to the footage, stating: "There was no Christmas party. COVID rules have been followed at all times."
- 8 December:
  - Speaking at PMQs, Johnson says that he was sickened and furious to see the clip of Stratton, and insists that no party took place at Downing Street. In response to a question from Labour MP Catherine West on whether there was a party on 13 November in Downing Street, he answers that "the guidance was followed and the rules were followed at all times".
  - Johnson confirms that an investigation headed by Case will examine claims of rule-breaking in Downing Street.
  - Outside her home, Stratton tearfully resigns as a government adviser.
  - News media begin referring to the scandal by the name Partygate.
- 9 December:
  - The scope of Case's investigation, which will look into three parties in 2020, is defined: two parties in Downing Street on 27 November and 18 December, and the party on 10 December at the Department of Education.
  - The Daily Mirror reports on Bailey's Christmas party on 14 December 2020, describing it as "raucous".
- 11 December: Reports emerge of the drinks party in HM Treasury on 25 November 2020.
- 12 December: Crerar publishes a photograph in the Sunday Mirror of Johnson hosting the virtual Christmas quiz in Downing Street on 15 December 2020, and quotes a source saying: "Nobody was working that evening, it was purely a social event."
- 13 December: Johnson is asked about the Sunday Mirror's report and responds by saying that he "certainly broke no rules".
- 14 December: In another article for the Daily Mirror, Crerar publishes a group photo of 24 guests at Bailey's Christmas party.
- 15 December: Following the reports of the Christmas party, Bailey announces his resignation as chair of the Police and Crime Committee in the London Assembly.
- 16 December: A joint investigation by The Guardian and The Independent reports on the party in the Downing Street garden on 15 May 2020, which sources describe as having a "celebratory" feel. Johnson's spokesperson responds to the story, saying that the event was one of "a series of meetings".

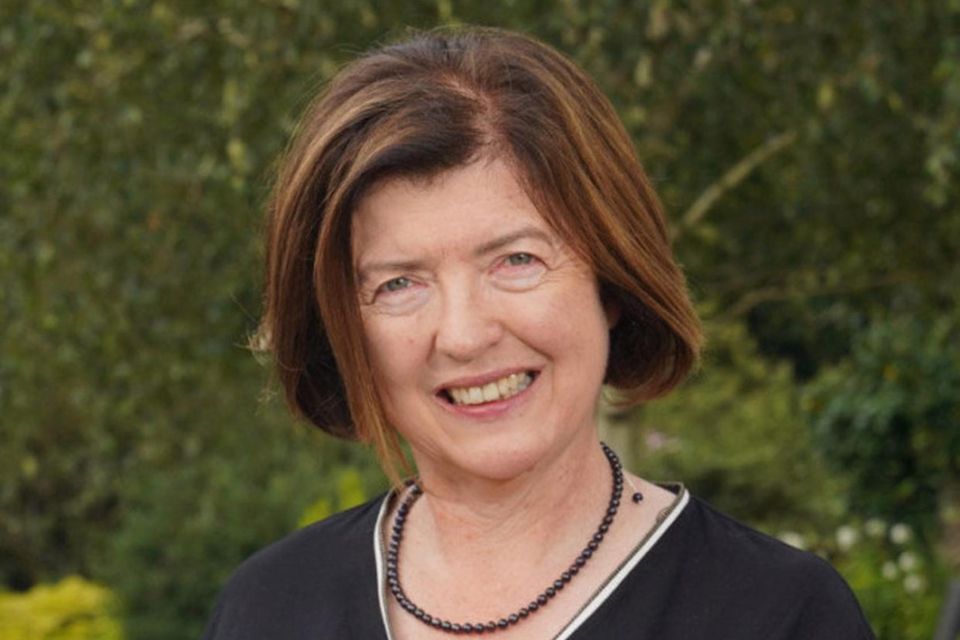
On 17 December 2021, the civil servant Sue Gray was brought in to investigate allegations of parties in Downing Street during lockdown.

- 17 December:
  - A separate joint investigation, led by The Independent and Politico, reports on the Christmas party held in the Cabinet Office for Case's staff on 17 December 2020. The article quotes three Whitehall officials, who call the event a "piss-up". The Cabinet Office describe the officials' accounts as being "categorically untrue".
  - Following these new allegations, Case withdraws from the investigation into lockdown-breaking parties. He is replaced by the civil servant Sue Gray.
- 19 December: The Guardian publishes a photo of the cheese and wine party on 15 May 2020, and questions Downing Street's claim that the event was a work meeting. Angela Rayner, the Deputy Leader of the Labour Party, describes the photo as "a slap in the face of the British public".
- 20 December: Asked about The Guardian's report by BBC News, Johnson defends the photograph, saying: "Those were people at work, talking about work."

=== 2022 ===
- 10 January: Paul Brand, UK editor at ITV News, publishes Reynolds's 20 May 2020 email, in which he invites staff to the drinks in the Downing Street garden that evening. Conservative MPs react with fury to the email, with one frontbencher saying that it is the "worst exposed" Johnson has ever been by the leaks.

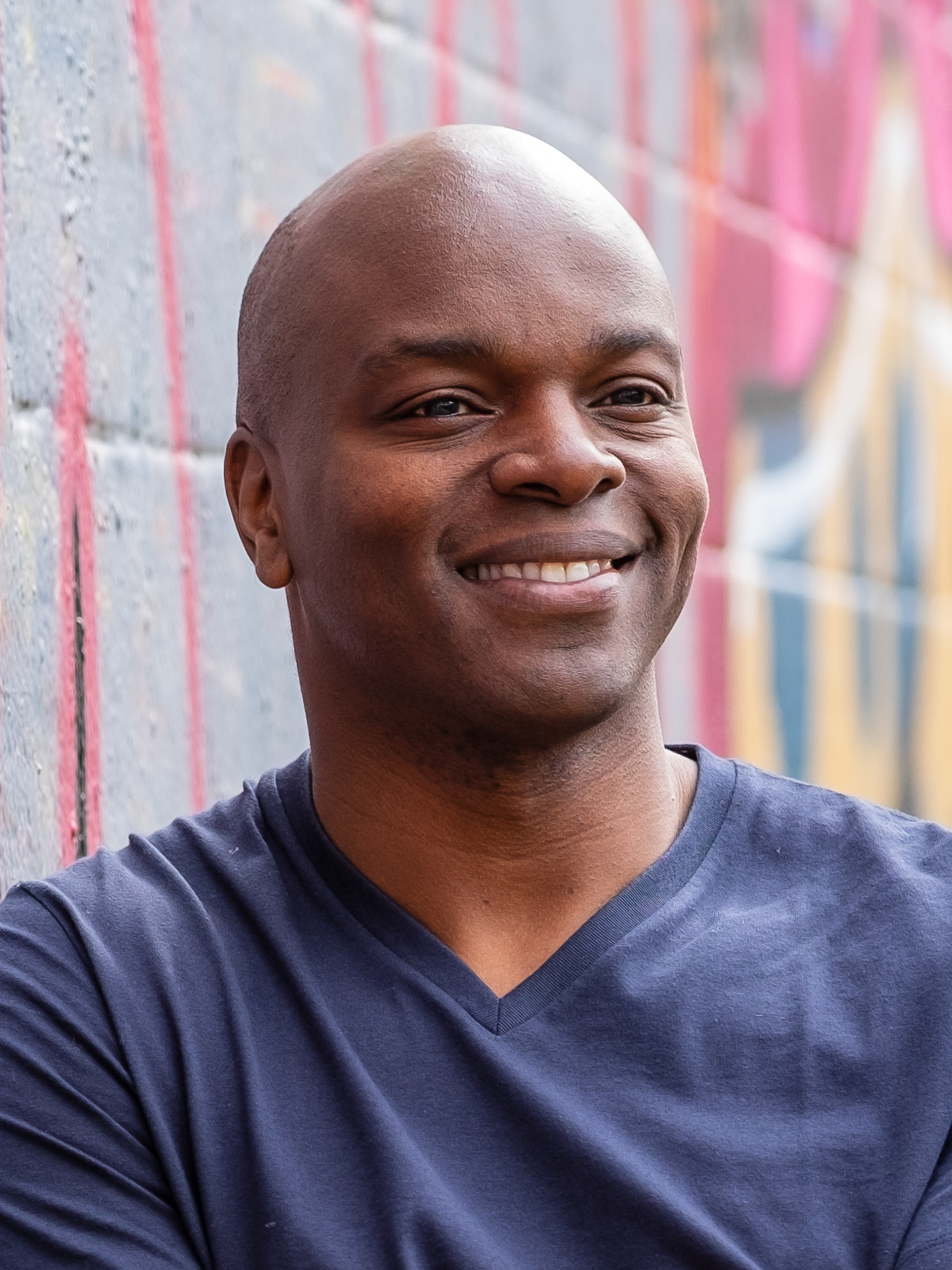
Shaun Bailey resigned as chair of the Economy Committee in the London Assembly on 11 January 2022.

- 11 January:
  - Amid calls for Reynolds to resign, the Prime Minister's official spokesperson says that he has Johnson's full confidence.
  - Bailey steps down as chair of the Economy Committee in the London Assembly.
- 12 January:
  - Speaking at PMQs, Johnson admits that he attended the BYOB party on 20 May 2020, and apologises. Starmer calls on him to resign.
  - Douglas Ross, the leader of the Scottish Conservative Party, publicly calls for Johnson to stand down.
- 13 January:
  - Citing eyewitnesses to the events, The Daily Telegraph reports on the two leaving parties on 16 April 2021, the eve of Prince Philip's funeral.
  - In a separate article, The Daily Telegraph reveals that as many as 30 Conservative MPs have submitted letters of no confidence in Johnson to Graham Brady, the chairman of the party's 1922 Committee. If Brady receives at least 54 letters, representing 15% of the party's MPs, a vote on Johnson's leadership will be called.
- 14 January:
  - Following The Daily Telegraph's report, Slack apologises for the anger and hurt caused by his leaving party.
  - In a phone call, Downing Street officials apologise to Buckingham Palace for the lockdown parties.
  - Crerar reports on the wine fridge at Downing Street, and describes its being used by Downing Street staff for non-COVID-compliant gatherings—called "Wine Time Fridays"—every Friday afternoon during the pandemic.
- 17 January: In an exclusive, the Daily Mirror reports on Johnson's attendance at the leaving party on 17 December 2020.
- 18 January: Speaking at Finchley Memorial Hospital in North Finchley, Johnson publicly apologises to the Queen for his misjudgments, but says that "nobody told" him that the BYOB event was against the rules.
- 24 January: Reporting for ITV News, Brand reveals details of the two celebrations for Johnson's 56th birthday on 19 June 2020. A spokesperson for the Prime Minister denies the reports, describing them as "totally untrue", and says that Johnson only hosted a small number of guests in the Downing Street garden that evening, which was in line with the rules at the time.
- 25 January: Addressing the London Assembly, Commissioner of Police of the Metropolis Cressida Dick confirms that a criminal investigation has been launched into potential breaches of COVID-19 regulations in Downing Street and Whitehall. Having received evidence from Gray, the Metropolitan Police will investigate eight gatherings. Consequently, the publication of Gray's report is delayed.
- 31 January: Gray issues a report into COVID-19 rule-breaking in government. As a result of the police's investigation, it has been scaled back to a 12-page document covering just her initial findings. In her report, Gray says that she has uncovered "failures of leadership and judgment" in Downing Street under Johnson, and that there was a "serious failure" to follow the COVID-19 regulations. Johnson receives criticism from members of both his own party and the opposition.
- 3 February: Four of Johnson's top advisors—including Reynolds—quit his Downing Street team.
- 4 February: Crerar reports in the Daily Mirror that the police have obtained a photograph of Johnson and Sunak at Johnson's surprise birthday party on 19 June 2020.
- 9 February:
  - In another article, Crerar publishes a photograph of Johnson and three others attending the Christmas quiz on 15 December 2020.
  - The police reveal that their investigation has been given the name "Operation Hillman".
- 12 February: Downing Street confirms that Johnson is one of more than 50 people to have been emailed a questionnaire from the police as part of Operation Hillman. The questionnaires must be responded to within seven days.
- 22 February: In a report for ITV News, Brand reveals the content of the questionnaire, which instructs Downing Street staff to provide a "lawful exception" or "reasonable excuse" for having attended a party during lockdown. Completing the questionnaire is equivalent to being interviewed under caution, making Johnson the first prime minister to be questioned by the police under caution.
- 21 March: In a statement, the police announce that over 100 questionnaires in total have been sent out, and that detectives from the investigation team are interviewing key witnesses.
- 29 March: The police refer the first 20 fixed penalty notices (FPNs) to the ACRO Criminal Records Office (ACRO), who will then issue them. A spokesperson to the Prime Minister confirms that Johnson is not one of the people to have been issued a fine.
- 12 April: A further 30 FPNs are referred to the ACRO by the police. Downing Street confirms that Johnson and Sunak have each received a fine for attending the surprise birthday party on 19 June 2020, and a spokesperson for Johnson's wife Carrie confirms that she has also received one for the same event. Johnson therefore becomes the first serving prime minister to be found to have broken the law.
- 19 April:
  - Johnson delivers his first statement in the House of Commons on his law-breaking, in which he apologises and says that "it did not occur to [him]" that the birthday party might breach the lockdown restrictions. Starmer criticises the apology as "a joke".
  - Opposition MPs apply to table a motion for a debate and vote on 21 April on whether Johnson intentionally misled Parliament when he stated that COVID-19 rules had been followed at all times. Their application is approved by the Speaker of the House of Commons, Lindsay Hoyle.
- 21 April: In the House of Commons, the opposition's motion is passed without a vote. Johnson is therefore referred to the Commons Select Committee of Privileges for them to consider whether he deliberately misled the House. In Parliament, Conservative MPs call on him to resign.
- 5 May: In the first local elections since the Partygate story was broken, the Conservative Party lose 485 councillors and 11 councils. Local leaders cite the scandal as one of voters' key issues.
- 12 May: The police confirm that an additional batch of 50 FPNs have been issued in recent weeks, taking the total to over 100, and meaning that Downing Street has received more fines for lockdown-breaking parties than any other address in the UK.
- 19 May: Operation Hillman is concluded. In total, 126 FPNs have been issued to 83 people for events across eight dates. Starmer repeats his call for Johnson to resign.
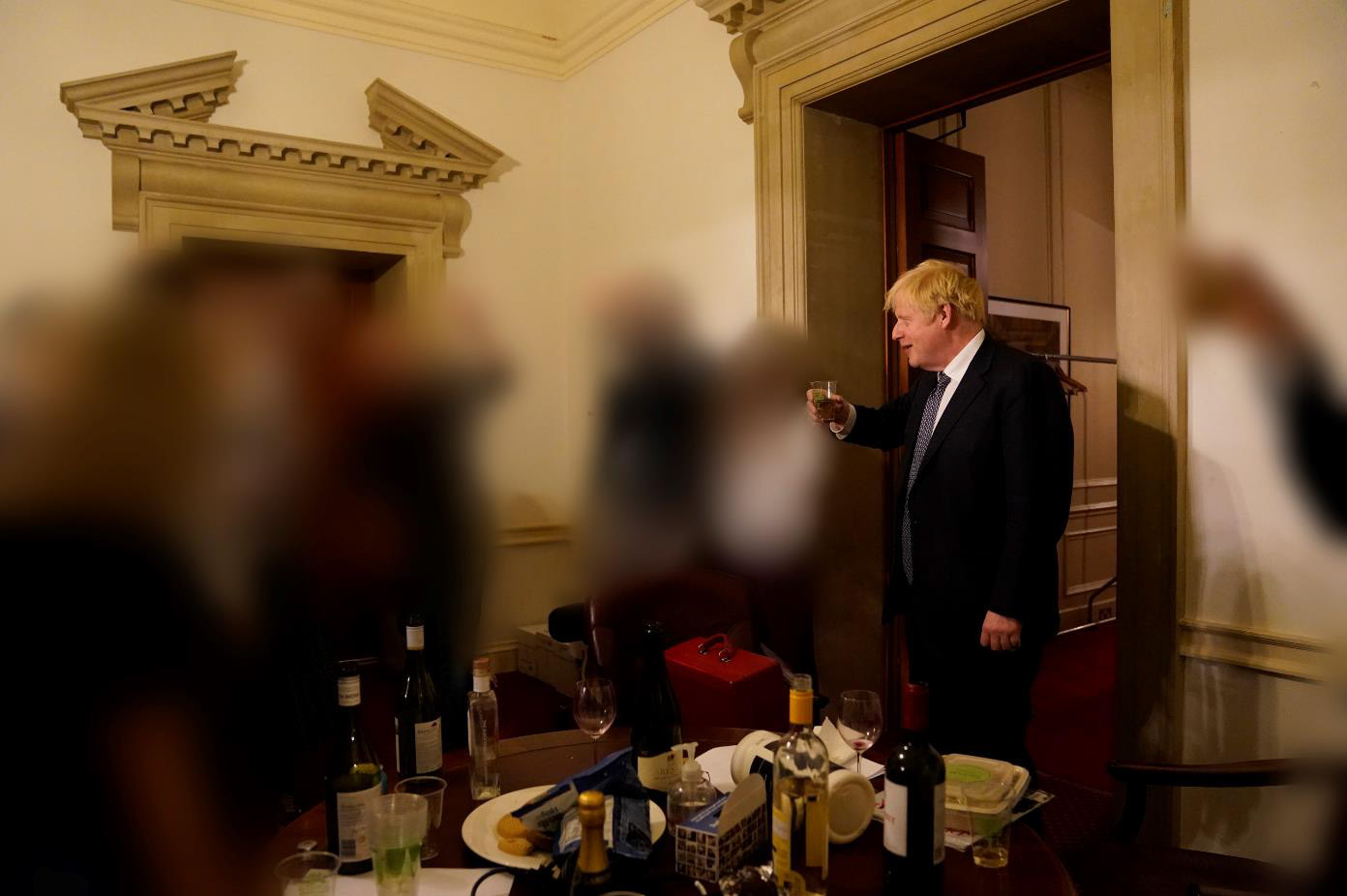
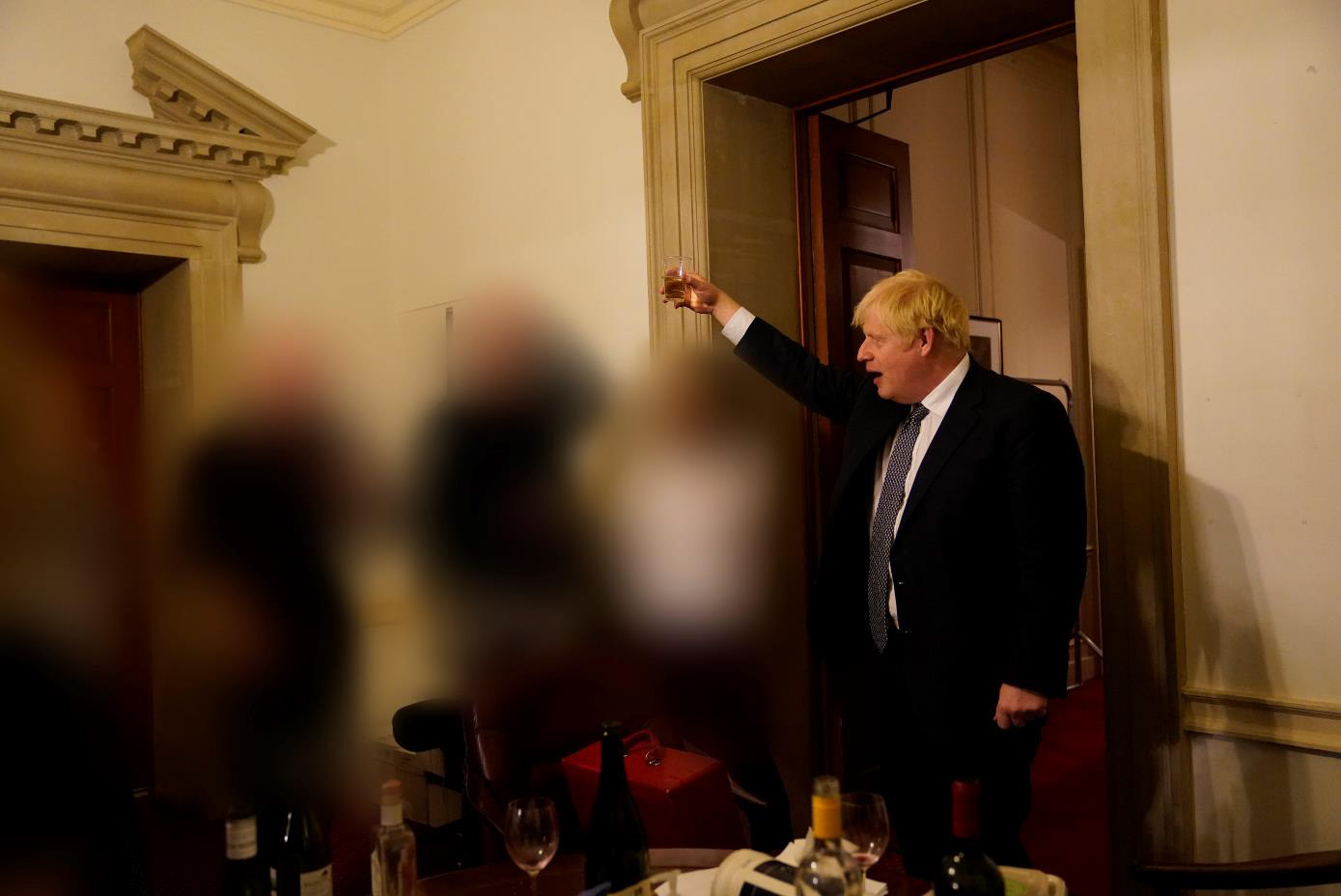
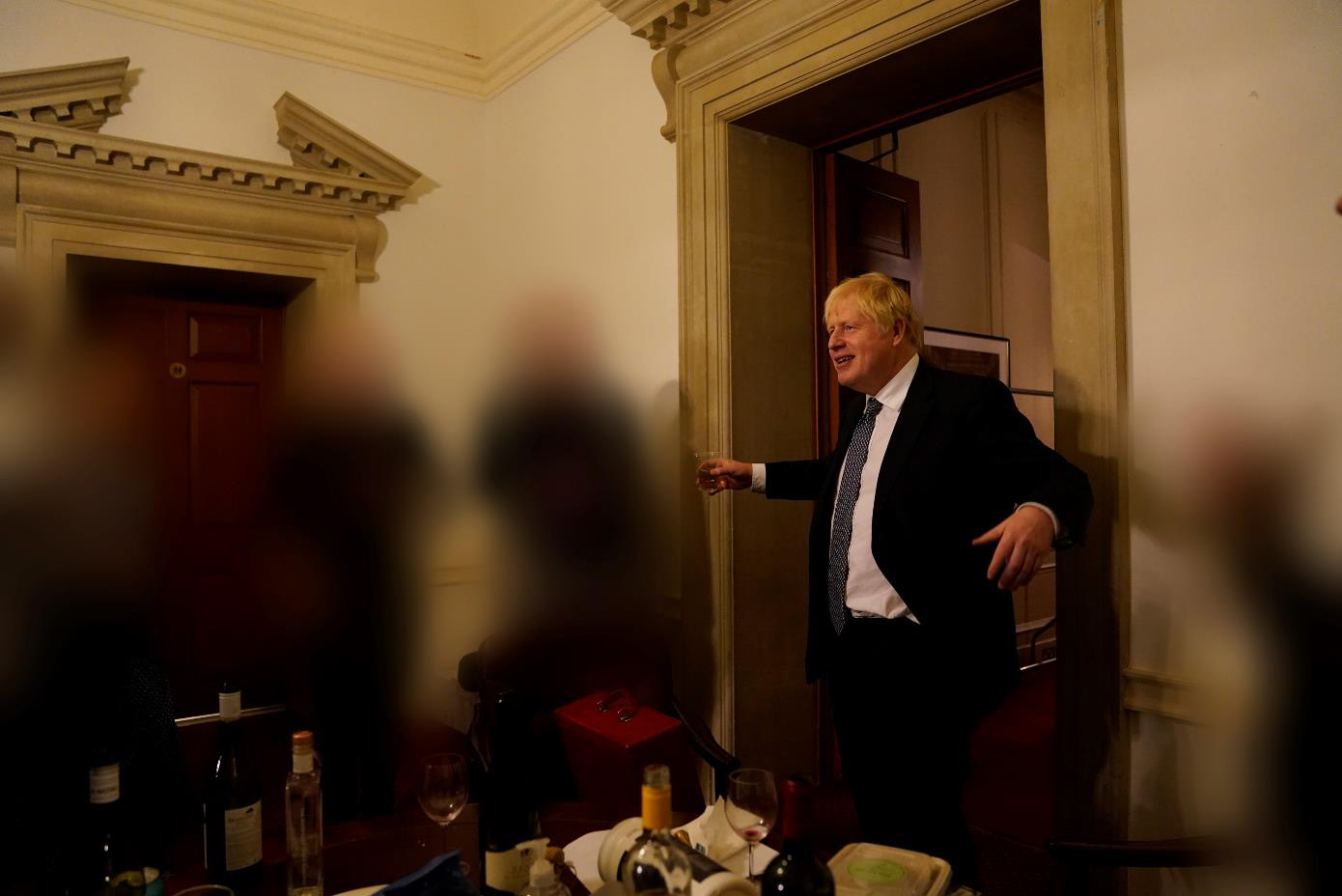
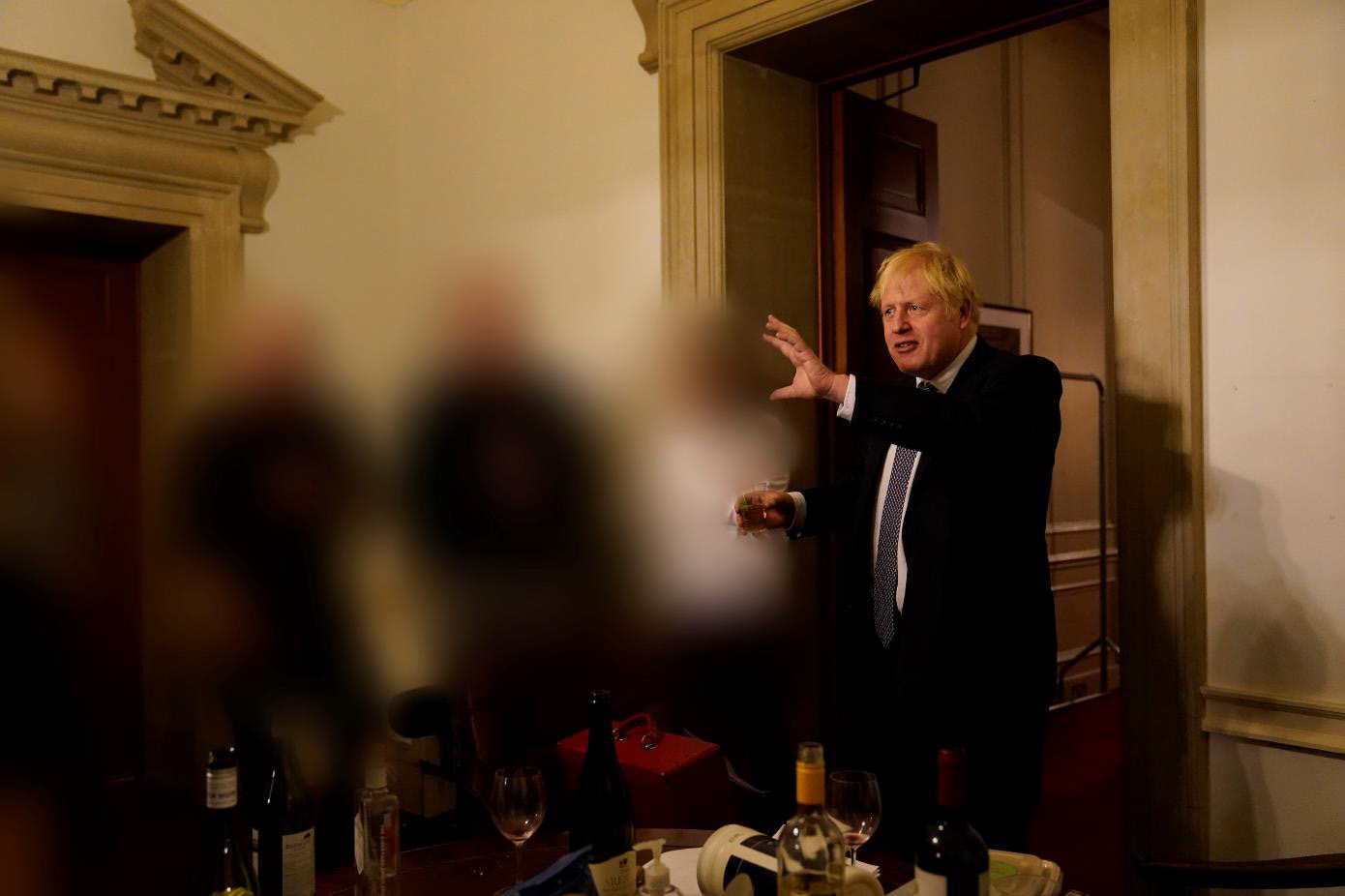
On 23 May 2022, ITV News published four photographs of Johnson attending the 13 November 2020 leaving party.
- 23 May: Reporting for ITV News, Brand publishes four photographs of Johnson attending and drinking wine at the leaving party on 13 November 2020. Downing Street responds that the Cabinet Office and the Met Police investigations have had access to all relevant information, including photographs.
- 25 May:
  - Gray publishes her final report on the lockdown-breaching parties in Downing Street and Whitehall. The document runs to 37 pages and includes nine photographs: the four that ITV News published two days earlier, and five more. In the report, which covers sixteen events between May 2020 and April 2021, Gray criticises the senior leadership at both Downing Street and the Cabinet Office, and says that they must bear responsibility for "failures of leadership and judgment".
  - Addressing MPs in the House of Commons, Johnson apologises again, and says that he takes "full responsibility for everything that took place on [his] watch".
- 6 June:
  - Brady announces that he has received letters of no confidence in Johnson from at least 54 Conservatives MPs, exceeding the threshold of 15% of the party's total MPs. He declares that a vote of no confidence in Johnson's leadership will be held between 18:00 and 20:00 that evening.
  - The confidence vote is held, with Johnson winning by 211 to 148.
- 5–7 July: Following the Chris Pincher scandal—in which it arose that Johnson had promoted the MP Chris Pincher to the role of Deputy Chief Whip, despite knowing beforehand that he was facing multiple allegations of sexual assault—61 members of Johnson's ministry resign and another is sacked, triggering a crisis in the government.

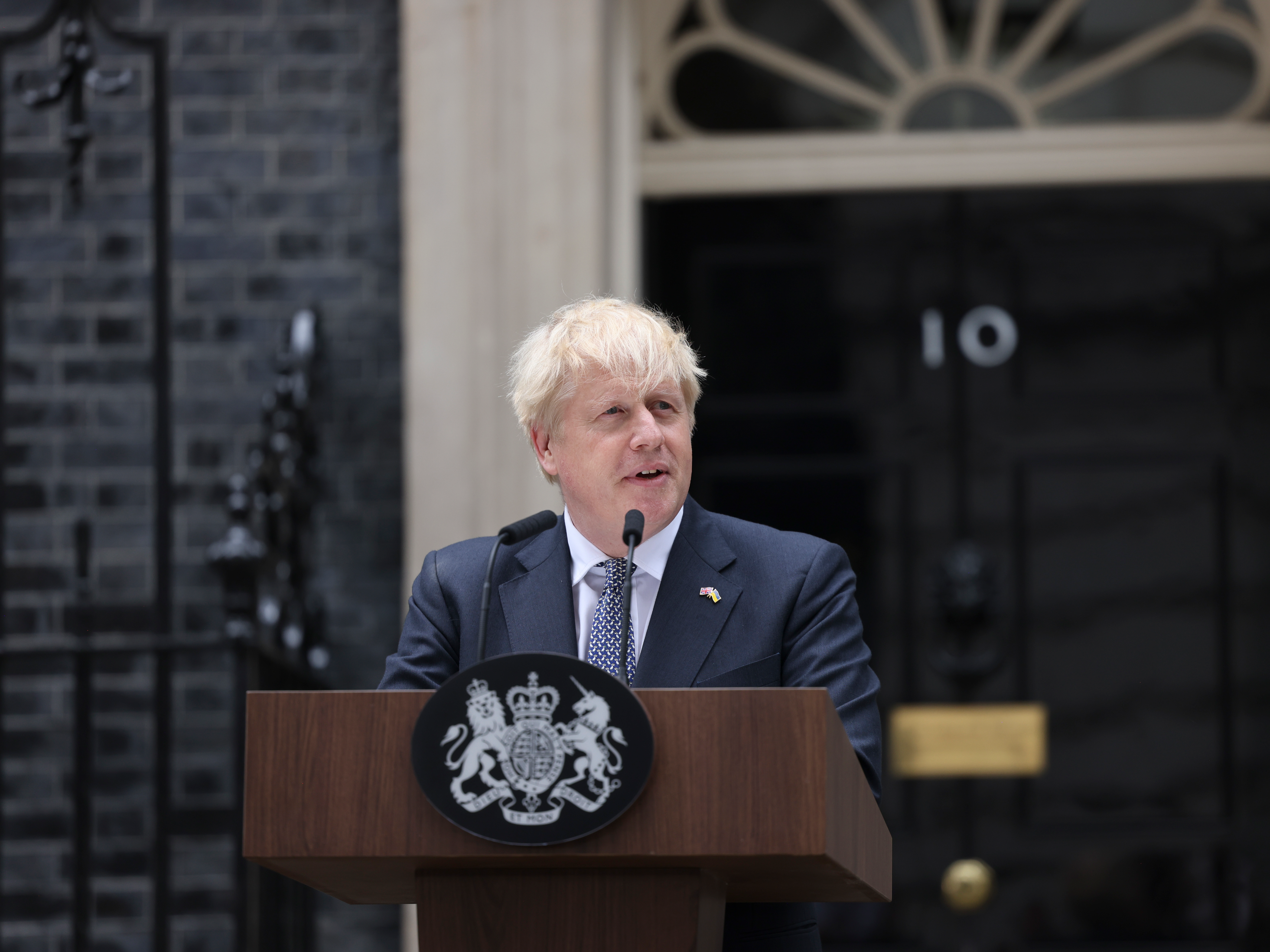
Johnson announcing his resignation as prime minister on 7 July 2022

- 7 July: In a speech outside 10 Downing Street, Johnson announces that he will resign as prime minister and leader of the Conservative Party, beginning a leadership election to replace him.
- 7 July–5 September: The leadership election to replace Johnson takes place, which is won by the Foreign Secretary, Liz Truss. She becomes the new leader of the Conservative Party and the next prime minister.
- 6 September: Delivering a speech in which he likens himself to the Roman statesman Lucius Quinctius Cincinnatus, Johnson departs from 10 Downing Street for the final time.
- 20–25 October: After another crisis in the government, Truss resigns as prime minister. She is replaced by Sunak.

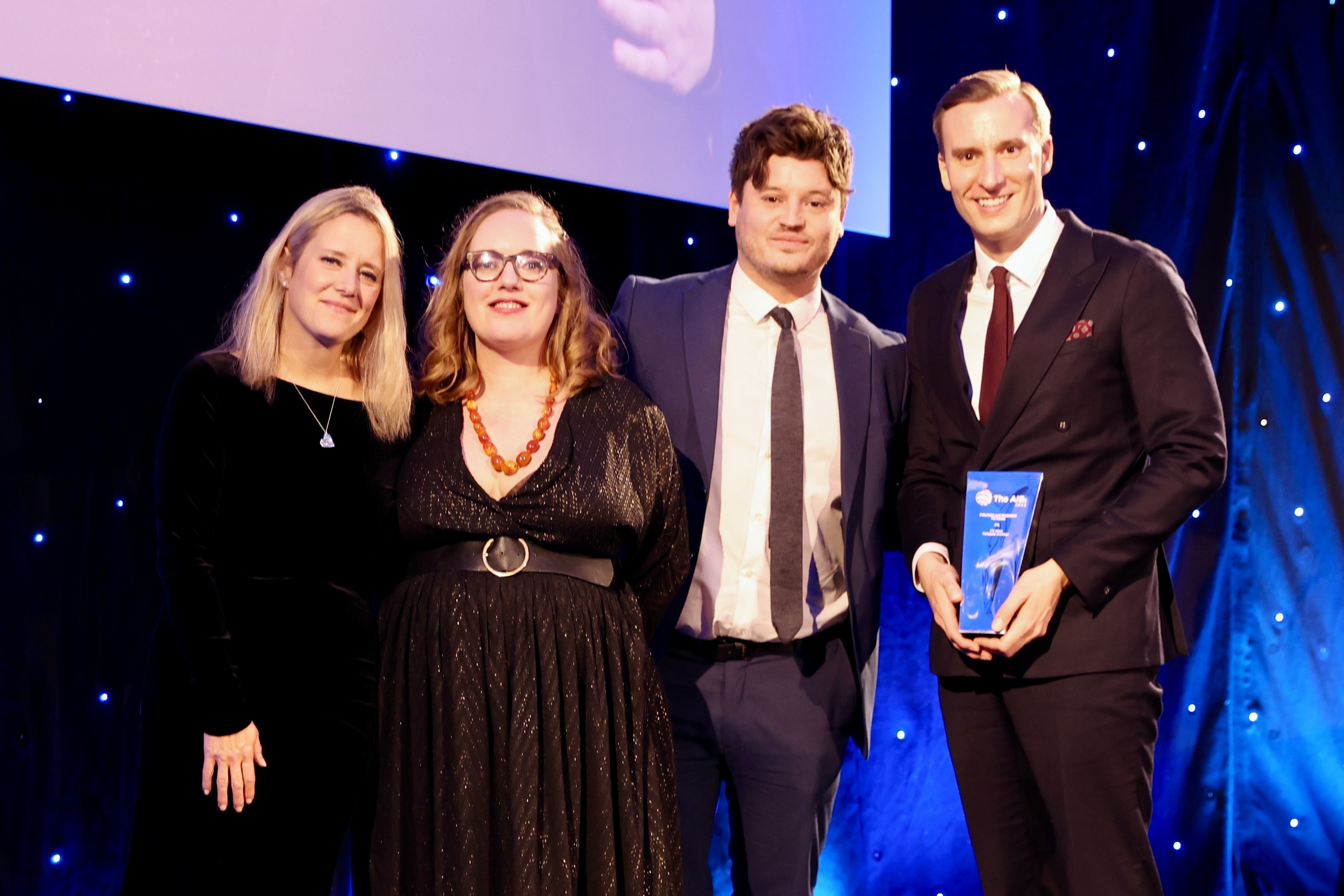
For their coverage of Partygate, Paul Brand (far right) and ITV News won two awards at the AIBs on 11 November 2022.

- 11 November: At the AIBs, Brand and the ITV News team win two awards in the Continuing News Coverage and Politics & Business categories for their reporting of Partygate.
- 15 December: For breaking the Partygate story, Crerar wins three awards, including Journalist of the Year, at the British Journalism Awards.

=== 2023 ===
- 11 January:
  - ITV News launches Partygate: The Inside Story, a podcast hosted by Brand that details how the scandal was investigated. The series includes new allegations, such as that Johnson had joked that the leaving do on 13 November 2020 was the "most unsocially distanced party" in the UK, and that his aides had sex during the parties on the eve of Prince Philip's funeral.
  - Following the fresh allegations, Unmesh Desai, the deputy chair of the Police and Crime Committee in the London Assembly, writes to Mark Rowley, the Commissioner of Police of the Metropolis, to urge him to open a new investigation into the latest claims.
- 3 March: The Commons Select Committee of Privileges publishes its initial report into whether Johnson deliberately misled Parliament, saying that he may have done so multiple times, and that breaches of the COVID-19 rules should have been obvious to him. The report includes new images of Johnson next to champagne at the 14 January 2021 leaving presentation.
- 20 March: A 52-page dossier of Johnson's written defence is handed to the committee. In the document, Johnson admits that he misled the House of Commons, but he had not "intentionally or recklessly" done so.
- 22 March: Johnson testifies before the committee. In the three-hour hearing, he denies intentionally misleading Parliament, saying that, "hand on heart", he did not lie to the House, and that he honestly believed that the events that he had attended were "lawful work gatherings".
- 16 May: After learning from diaries submitted by Johnson's lawyers that the former prime minister may have hosted approximately 12 social gatherings during lockdown at Chequers, his country residence in Buckinghamshire, the Cabinet Office refer Johnson to Thames Valley Police.
- 8 June: Johnson receives a "warning letter" from the Commons Select Committee of Privileges, detailing the criticism that they intend to make of him in their final report.
- 9 June:
  - Following his receipt of the warning letter, Johnson announces his resignation as the MP for Uxbridge and South Ruislip with immediate effect. In his 1,000-word resignation statement, he condemns the committee as a "kangaroo court" and its investigation as a "witch hunt".
  - The Cabinet Office publishes Johnson's honours list following his resignation as prime minister, which includes honours for some of those involved in the Partygate scandal, such as Reynolds, Bailey and Mallett.

The Commons Select Committee of Privileges' final report into Johnson, published on 15 June 2023

- 15 June: The Commons Select Committee of Privileges publish their final report. Running to 106 pages, it concludes that Johnson repeatedly committed contempts of Parliament. Had he not already resigned as an MP on 9 June, the committee would have recommended that he be suspended from Parliament for 90 days, which would have potentially triggered a by-election to replace him. Johnson decries the committee's conclusions as "deranged".
- 17 June: The Daily Mirror publishes the first Partygate video clip, showing Conservative aides drinking, dancing and laughing at Bailey's Christmas party on 14 December 2020.
- 19 June:
  - BBC News publishes the invitation to Bailey's Christmas party and reveals that it was formally called a "Jingle and Mingle" party. Bailey apologises "unreservedly" for the party.
  - In the House of Commons, MPs vote by 354 to 7 to endorse the committee's findings that Johnson committed five contempts of Parliament. This includes a revocation of Johnson's privilege to access Parliament.
- 4 July: The Metropolitan Police announce that they will reopen the investigation into Bailey's Christmas party, but that they and Thames Valley Police will not investigate the allegations of rule-breaking in Chequers, citing "further clarification" on Johnson's diary entries.
- 13 October: The police announce that they have referred an additional 24 FPNs to the ACRO for Bailey's Christmas party.

== Aftermath ==
The Partygate scandal is remembered as having contributed to the decline of Johnson's premiership and his standing as a politician. An opinion poll by the market research firm YouGov on 13 February 2022 revealed that 70% of respondents regarded Johnson as performing badly as prime minister, compared with 25% who felt that he was doing well. In the three months after the Partygate story was broken, Johnson's approval ratings dropped by almost 15 percentage points. His assertion on 8 December 2021 that "the guidance was followed and the rules were followed at all times" was pivotal in the committee's finding that he had misled Parliament, and was described by Archie Mitchell of The Independent as "the 12 words that sparked Boris Johnson's downfall". Anger over the scandal also led to a decline in political trust – in June 2024, the British Social Attitudes Survey revealed that 79% of the public were dissatisfied with the way that the UK was governed, with Partygate cited amongst the causes.

On 4 July 2024, the first general election since the Partygate story broke was held. The Labour Party, led by Starmer, won a total of 411 seats, giving them a landslide majority of 174 in the House of Commons. The Conservatives, led by Sunak, won 121 seats on a vote share of 23.7%, the party's worst result at a general election in its history. In a report surveying opinion after the election, the research agency More in Common and University College London found that 49% of the public felt that the Partygate scandal was one of the Conservatives' biggest mistakes since 2019, second only to 54% naming mismanagement of the National Health Service.

== See also ==
- Timeline of Brexit – a similar political timeline of the UK involving Johnson
- Timeline of British history (1990–present)
