= Daughters of Eve (organisation) =

Daughters of Eve was a UK-based non-profit organisation that worked to protect girls and young women who were at risk from female genital mutilation (FGM).

The organisation raised awareness of the practice of FGM, provided support and resources for women who have experienced FGM, and campaigned to eliminate FGM.

They launched a successful e-petition to get the subject of FGM on the UK Government’s agenda. The petition called for the Home Office to draw up and implement a national strategy and action plan to eliminate FGM in the UK.

Daughters of Eve founders Leyla Hussein and Nimco Ali were named as two of Britain's most influential women in the BBC Woman's Hour power list 2014.
