= Leyla Hussein =

British psychotherapist and social activist

Leyla Hussein OBE
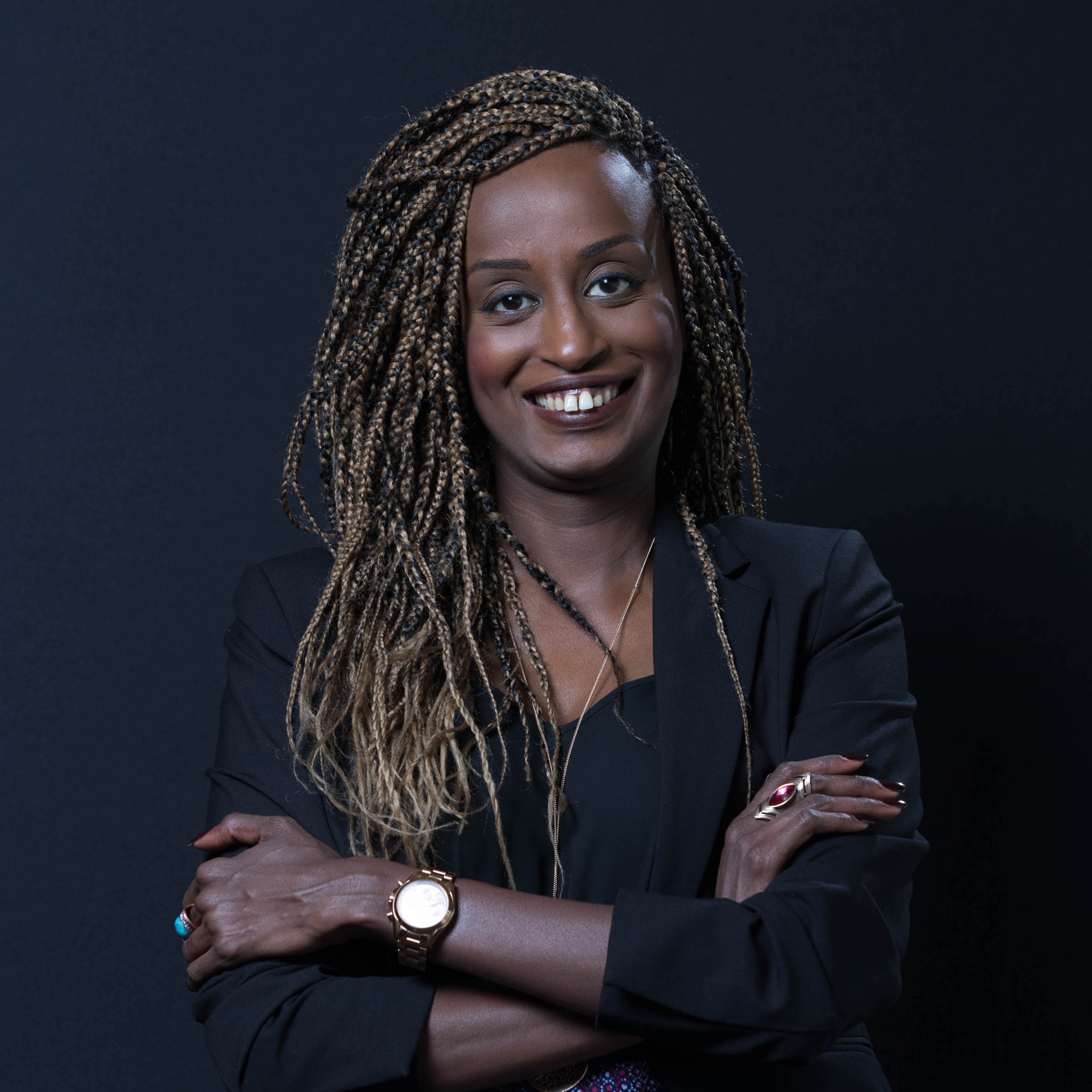
- Leyla Hussein at Oslo Freedom Forum

Lord Rector of the University of St Andrews
- In office October 2020 – October 2023
- Preceded by: Srđa Popović
- Succeeded by: Stella Maris

Personal details
- Born: 1980 (age 45–46) Somalia
- Education: Thames Valley University
- Occupation: Psychotherapist and social activist
- Known for: Founder of Dahlia Project, founder of Daughters of Eve, Chief Executive of Hawa's Haven

Leyla Hussein OBE (Somali: Leyla Xuseen) is a Somali-born British psychotherapist and social activist. She is the founder of Dahlia project, one of the co-founders of the Daughters of Eve non-profit organisation and a Chief Executive of Hawa's Haven. In 2020, Hussein was elected Rector of the University of St Andrews, making her the third woman and first woman of colour to hold this position.

== Career ==
Hussein worked for ten years in reproductive health after being a youth outreach worker. Hussein worked for African Well Women Clinic in Waltham Forest where she worked closely with female genital mutilation (FGM) survivors from the UK. Leyla worked at the NAZ project London as a sexual health advisor working with Somali affected by HIV and AIDS. In 2010, she along with Nimco Ali and Sainab Abdi founded Daughters of Eve. The non-profit organisation was established to help young women and girls, with a focus on providing education and raising awareness on FGM. Hussein herself is a FGM survivor. Following her pregnancy, she wanted to ensure the physical safety of her daughter and that inspired her to start campaigning to make a change on how girls globally are protected from all forms of harm.

Additionally, Hussein is the Chief Executive of Hawa's Haven, a coalition of Somali women campaigners and community activists that aims to raise awareness on gender-based violence. She likewise runs the support therapy group Dahlia's Project, which was established in partnership with Manor Garden Health Advocacy Project where she serves as an Independent Training Consultant, as well as a Community Facilitator.

She is the global ambassador for The Girl Generation, a social change communication programme aiming to end FGM in one generation, currently working in 10 African countries.

As a health professional, Hussein works closely with the Metropolitan Police via its Project Azure. She was formerly an advisor for the END FGM-European campaign supported by Amnesty International, speaking in this capacity before the Cyprus, Vienna and London legislatures. In addition, Hussein sits on the board of trustees of The Special FGM Initiative Advisory Group and the Desert Flower Foundation Advisory Group, charity funded by Waris Dirie, and Her Majesty's Inspectorate of Constabulary advisory group on Violence Against Women and Girls (VAWG) Scrutiny and Involvement Panel by the Crown Prosecution. She also used to sit on Naz Project London Board of Trustees.

Hussein was one of five protagonists in the documentary #Female Pleasure, directed by Swiss filmmaker Barbara Miller and premiered at Locarno Festival 2018. The film talks about sexuality in the 21st century from a woman's perspective and about ongoing repression of women in patriarchal structures.

In 2020, Hussein was elected rector of the University of St Andrews for a three-year term. Hussein has faced criticism from student newspaper The Saint, which reported in October 2023 that as rector she had only visited St Andrews once and failed to attend 10 of the 12 meetings (including virtual) of the University Court. The paper quoted the Rector's assessor as stating that Hussein had failed to fulfil her obligations as Rector with the Student Association President Barry Will adding “ "I don’t think it’s much to ask. There is an obligation to be in those spaces and advocate for students."

== Lectures and talks ==
Besides her psychotherapeutic and consultancy work, Hussein has been invited to speak on matters of concerning girls, women and human rights on various platforms including TedX, Oslo Freedom Forum, Women of the World Festival, Fuse Festival, AKE Festival, Stylist Live Event and more.

She has spoken in various radio and television programmes including Radio World Service, BBC World, Have Your Say, Woman's Hour, Universal TV, BBC TV, Al Jazeera TV, Channel 5, CNN, ABC. She currently stars on The Guilty Feminist podcasts and was recently interviewed by Jay Nordlinger.

In 2013, Hussein presented The Cruel Cut, a documentary following her work on ending FGM in the UK. It aired on Channel 4 and instantly became groundbreaking documentary that helped change the British policies and law on how to tackle FGM. The documentary and Hussein were nominated for a BAFTA in 2014.

Hussein has been invited to speak in several universities over the last years, including Cambridge, Oxford, UCL, West London University, Columbia, Banard, Georgetown, Harvard and Penn University.

== Personal life ==
Hussein was born in 1980 in Somalia. Her parents were educated professionals, and she came from privileged family.

Hussein later emigrated to the United Kingdom. For her post-secondary education, she earned a postgraduate diploma in therapeutic counseling from the Thames Valley University.

She has a daughter.

== Honours and awards ==
Hussein has received a number of awards for her work. Among these are the 2008 PCT Breaking Down Barriers Award, the 2010 Cosmopolitan Ultimate Campaigner Women of the Year Award, the 2011 Emma Humphrey Award, the Lin Groves Special Award, the 2012 True Honour Award by the Iranian and Kurdish Women's Right organisation, the BBC 100 Women of 2013, the Ambassador for Peace Prize by the Inter-religious and International Peace Federation, Debretts 500 list since 2014.

In addition, Hussein and Ali received a community/charity award at the 2014 Red Magazine Woman of the Year awards for their work with Daughters of Eve. They also placed sixth in the Woman's Hour Power List 2014.

Hussein was appointed Officer of the Order of the British Empire (OBE) in the 2019 Birthday Honours for services to tackling female genital mutilation and gender inequality.

Academic offices
Preceded by Srđa Popović	Rector of the University of St Andrews; 2020—2023	Succeeded by Stella Maris
