= Lul Hassan Matan =

Somaliland human rights activist and politician

- Luul Xasan Mataan
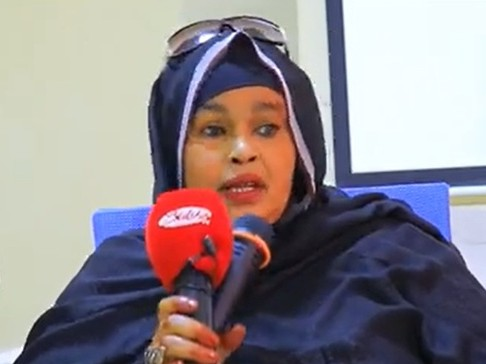
- Born: Hargeisa
- Occupations: Human rights activist, politician
- Organization: SOCWER
- Known for: Activism for street children and women's rights

Lul Hassan Matan (Somali: Luul Xasan Mataan) is a Somaliland human rights activist and politician. She is known for her work helping street children, women, and minority communities in Somaliland.

== Biography ==
=== Early life and education ===
Lul Hassan Matan was born in Hargeisa. She attended the Hussein Giire intermediate school in the city and then went to the SITY school. She later studied at the SIDAM school, where she studied management for three years and accounting and administration for two years. When the civil war broke out in 1988, she left Hargeisa and fled to Mogadishu. In Mogadishu, she was employed by the Somali Ports Authority and worked as an accountant while the country was destabilizing.

=== Street street children's center in Hargeisa ===
In 2009, Lul opened the Mohamed Moge center, also known as the Mustaqbal center, for street children in Hargeisa. To raise money for the center, she sold her own land and received donations from her relatives, traders, and local companies like Dahabshiil and Telesom. Under the system, the Somaliland government gave a small subsidy of 4,000 Somaliland shillings per day for each child. At first, some people spread false rumors that the center was selling children to foreigners in Mogadishu, and religious leaders preached against it. However, people stopped opposing the center after they visited it. The center successfully returned 130 street children to their families.

In March 2013, Lul held a press conference to complain about pressure from Mahamoud Ahmed Barre Garaad, the Minister of Employment and Social Affairs. She stated that during the nine months Garaad had been minister, he frequently raided the center and frightened the children. She also accused him of stopping the center's fuel supply, stopping payments to three women who cooked for the children, and threatening the center's staff.

In October 2013, the center housed 150 children. The Ministry of Employment and Social Affairs tried to remove Lul from her position for seven months by writing replacement letters. The government claimed that an audit by the Auditor General had found financial errors in the center's management, and the ministry offered to officially employ Lul as a Grade A government official and director to keep managing the center under the ministry's control, which Lul refused. Following the dispute over the ownership and management of the center, President Ahmed Mohamed Silanyo sent a delegation of ten members of parliament to demand that Lul either hand over the keys or place the center under the ministry. Lul refused to hand over the center, and the police detained her for seven days. The government stated that she was detained for claiming ownership of state property and for disobedience.

The opposition political party UCID strongly condemned her arrest, stating that the government had no right to manage the center. In an official statement, UCID claimed that the main reason behind the government's persistent pressure and Lul's arrest was political, noting that she was the sister of Cabdirashiid Xasan Mataan, who was then UCID's vice-presidential candidate. To enforce the takeover, a direct order from the presidential palace sent a military unit with six armored vehicles to raid the center in the early morning. Lul was eventually forced to hand over the center. After the government took over, about 150 children living there ran away because they did not trust the new managers.

=== Street children's center in Borama ===
In November 2013, Lul traveled to Borama, where thousands of local residents and city council members welcomed her. During this visit, she laid the foundation stone for a new care center in the western part of the city to support homeless children.

Lul created a local charity called SOCWER. Through this organization, she protected abused children and supported women and minority groups.

=== Campaign for local and national office ===
In July 2019, Lul participated in a press conference as a member of the women's wing of the ruling Kulmiye party to support President Muse Bihi Abdi's official visit to Guinea. During the event, she strongly asserted the sovereignty and independence of Somaliland, stating that Somaliland did not need anything from Somalia.

In 2019, Lul ran for election to become the mayor of Borama. During her campaign, she worked to build a new care home for street children in the city. At the same time, she was one of 10 women in a local group lobbying for more government positions for women in Somaliland.

In 2020, Lul ran as a candidate for the Somaliland House of Representatives. In September 2020, the parliament had rejected a quota law that would save 18 seats for women. Lul stated that rape and violence against women and children increased because there were almost no women in parliament. Even though the quota law was rejected, she decided not to drop out and continued her campaign to compete against men for votes.

== Family ==
As of August 2019, Lul had six children.
