= Mariam Dahir =

Somali women's rights activist

- Known for: Anti-female genital mutilation activism

Mariam Dahir is a Somali doctor, researcher and anti-female genital mutilation activist. She is part of the small team that drafted the proposed law against FGM in Somaliland.

Dahir was born and is based in Hargeisa.

== Education ==
Dahir graduated from the University of Hargeisa's Medical School in 2010. She earned a Postgraduate Diploma in Public Health Research from James Lind Institute in Singapore. She received her Master of Science in Health Care Management from Università telematica internazionale Uninettuno.

== Activism ==
Dahir witnessed the dangerous effects of female genital mutilation (FGM) when she undertook training as a medical doctor. It pushed her to campaign against FGM. She received much resistance from her community but she persisted. Dahir conducted talks and events around Somaliland to convince people about the detrimental complications of FGM. She also walks around the market to converse with women about the issue.

Dahir was part of the group that drafted a law concerning the ban of FGM in Somaliland. It is yet to be approved.

Dahir teaches at Franz Fanon University in Hargeisa. She extended her activism to the field of education by campaigning for the inclusion of FGM in the medical curriculum. She serves as chairperson of Youth anti-FGM Somaliland, an initiative that connects and encourages the youth community to participate in the efforts to end FGM in Somaliland. Dahir also works with United Nations Population Fund to address various forms of violence against women in Somalia.
