= Paul Brand (journalist) =

British journalist

- Education: University of Oxford; City, University of London
- Occupation: Journalist
- Employer: ITV
- Notable credit: Tonight
- Title: UK Editor of ITV News
- Spouse: Joe Cuddeford
- Children: 1

Paul Brand (born 16 September 1985) is a Welsh journalist who is UK Editor of ITV News. He has been presenter of current affairs programme Tonight since 2022 and is also a regular presenter of ITV News at Ten, Good Morning Britain and a radio show on LBC. He was formerly a political correspondent for ITV News.

== Early and personal life ==
Brand grew up in Bridgend and St Athan, Wales. His mother trained as a solicitor. He grew up in the late 1980s and early 1990s. He attended his local comprehensive school, where he became head boy, and says he wanted to be a journalist from "about the age of 17 or 18". He attended the University of Oxford and received a bursary from ITV to study journalism at City, University of London.

Brand is married to civil servant Joe Cuddeford. They have a son, born through a surrogate mother.

== Career ==
Brand began his career as a production journalist at ITV Wales. He worked as a reporter, before becoming a political correspondent for ITV Yorkshire and ITV Tyne Tees & Border. He then reported on politics for Good Morning Britain, and joined the network ITV News team in 2016. He became a political correspondent for ITV News. During the 2016 EU membership referendum, Brand was the first reporter to call the defining result in Sunderland as Leave. Brand co-founded the campaign School Diversity Week, which encourages LGBT+ inclusivity in schools. He hosts the ITV News podcast Acting Prime Minister.

In July 2018, during Brand's interview with Prime Minister Theresa May, she apologised for how she had sometimes voted on gay rights in the past, stating that she had "developed her view" on LGBT issues.

Brand became UK Editor of ITV News in 2021. He led an investigation for Tonight called Searching for Patient Zero: Britain's AIDS Tragedy, in which he uncovered the identity of the first recorded person to die of AIDS in the UK, John Eaddie. In November 2021 he presented a documentary about Eaddie.

Brand produced the first evidence of a party in Downing Street during a COVID-19 lockdown, when he reported of a party that took place in May 2020. He obtained significant footage of Downing Street staff at a December 2020 press conference rehearsal, in which they joked about a Christmas party that secretly took place at 10 Downing Street while the country was in a lockdown. The ensuing political scandal became known by the name Partygate. Brand later revealed an email inviting Downing Street staff to a party in the garden in May 2020, evidence of a birthday party for Boris Johnson (which Johnson was subsequently fined for) and evidence of a leaving party for Boris Johnson's former Director of Communications Lee Cain.

Following Laura Kuenssberg's announcement of her departure as political editor of BBC News, Brand was described in the media as a frontrunner for the position. According to The Times, "several industry sources" claimed he had been approached by the BBC in connection with the position. However, he agreed to stay on at ITV after being offered new roles, including as the presenter of Tonight. On 9 March 2022 he was confirmed to be the new presenter of Tonight, and succeeded Julie Etchingham in April. Etchingham had decided to step down from Tonight to concentrate on ITV News at Ten and documentary projects. Brand also continued in his role as UK Editor. He was reported to have agreed to a "substantial pay rise" for his new roles.

Brand first reported a photograph from November 2020 of Prime Minister Boris Johnson raising a glass at a party. It was falsely suggested on social media that Brand's husband Joe Cuddeford was the source of the photograph. Cuddeford is a civil servant working at the Geospatial Commission, a government body which is part of the Cabinet Office. Brand used Twitter to deny claims that his source is a family member, and said he had been subjected to homophobic abuse and disinformation by internet trolls. He stated that his husband had not received a fixed penalty notice or attended any parties.

In June 2024, Brand interviewed Rishi Sunak during the general election campaign, which the then Prime Minister conducted immediately after leaving D-Day commemorations in Normandy early to continue campaigning. Sunak apologised for his judgement, with Brand explaining that Downing Street had decided the timing of the interview.

Brand is a stand-in presenter of Good Morning Britain, where he has presented with Kate Garraway and Ranvir Singh. He is also a regular presenter of ITV News at Ten and a show on LBC radio.

== Awards ==
Brand won the Broadcaster of the Year award at the 2019 PinkNews awards for his investigations into gay conversion therapy.

Brand won an Excellence in Journalism Award from Press Gazette in July 2020 for his investigations which revealed that patients were being discharged from hospitals into care homes without being tested for COVID-19. He won the Political Journalist of the Year award at the 2020 British Journalism Awards, alongside Dominique Heckels, for their reporting on the impact of COVID-19 in care homes.

Brand won Political Journalist of the Year, Scoop of the Year and Home News Coverage of the Year at the 2023 Royal Television Society Awards for his reports exposing the partygate scandal. The same year he was also named London Press Club Broadcaster of the Year.

His podcast, Partygate: The Inside Story, made with producer Nathan Lee, won a Gold award at the British Podcast Awards 2023, as well as Podcast of the Year at the Society of Editors Media Freedom Awards in 2023 and an international AIB award.

At the 2025 Royal Television Society Awards, Brand won Specialist Journalist of the Year and Political Journalist of the Year for his investigations into assisted dying and his coverage of the 2024 general election.

Media offices
Preceded by Allegra Stratton as National Editor	UK Editor of ITV News; 2021–present	Incumbent
Preceded by Julie Etchingham	Presenter of Tonight; 2022–present	Incumbent
