= Warsame Abdi Shirwa =

Somali politician

Minister of Information
- In office 18 January 2009 – 5 August 2009
- Succeeded by: Abdulhakim Ahmed Guled

Personal details
- Born: Galkayo, Somalia
- Died: 5 August 2009 Galkayo, Somalia
- Cause of death: gunshot wound

Warsame Abdi Shirwa 'Seefta Banaanka' (Somali: Warsame Cabdi Shirwac; 18 January 2009 – 5 August 2009) was a Somali politician and Minister of Information of Puntland when he was assassinated in Galkayo, Mudug region.

== Death ==
He was a part of a delegation traveling to Galkayo sent by Puntland's president. On August 5, 2009, he was at the restaurant Liiban Super in Galkayo when unidentified gunmen opened fire from a car and killed him. He was buried the next day. Several ministers of Puntland including President Abdirahman Farole attended his funeral.
