= Hibo Aden Diriye =

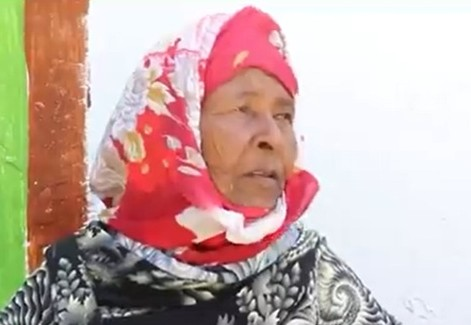
- Born: c. 1978; Djibouti
- Education: University of Hargeisa
- Occupations: Humanitarian, women's rights officer, protection specialist
- Spouse: Ibrahim Abdisalam Sheikh Barkhad

Hibo Aden Diriye (Somali: Hibo Aadan Diiriye), as known as Samawada, is a Somaliland humanitarian, protection specialist, and women's rights officer. Since 2011, she has worked with ActionAid, focusing on women's rights, literacy, capacity building, and protecting women and children from rights violations.

== Biography ==
Hibo was born in Djibouti, but the places where she grew up could not be counted. In a 2016 interview, she mentioned that she started working 25 years ago when he was 13, which suggests she was born around 1978.

At the age of 13 (around 1991), Hibo started her work in Kalabaydh. After seeing children who were already like grown men at that time and had been expelled from school after being caught smoking, she and Ibrahim Abdisalam Sheikh Barkhad, who later became her husband, opened a school for adults and gathered more than 200 people there.

Hibo studied law at the University of Hargeisa, and her learning was accompanied by part-time work as a paralegal. After graduation, an internship programme with the Somaliland Women Lawyers Association led her to practicing law.

=== Internaional career ===
Since 2011, Hibo has worked for ActionAid International Somaliland, focusing on capacity building for women's coalitions providing human rights training, monitoring the Revolving Fund for Women assisting with income generation projects, and managing women's literacy classes.

In February 2013, Somaliland President Silanyo honored 100 individuals who had contributed to Somaliland over the past 20 years, and Hibo was selected as one of two recipients in the child welfare category.

In October 2021, Hibo called for an end to the Tigray War in Ethiopia. Speaking to Bulsho TV, she expressed deep shock over the conflict because it caused massacres, displacement, rape, and famine. She described the situation as "outrageous" and urged Ethiopian Prime Minister Abiy Ahmed to stop the fighting. She also asked the international community, including the United States and Britain, to work together to end the violence, calling the war a catastrophe for human conscience.

At the same time, Hibo expressed sadness over the deportation of hundreds of Somali families from Las Anod. She urged Somaliland President Muse Bihi Abdi to reconsider the action. She argued that while criminals should face justice, innocent people should be treated fairly because the country is law-abiding.

In February 2022, when the Russia-Ukraine war began, Somaliland, which relies on imports for products such as spaghetti, flour, and rice, was severely affected. Hibo stated that the Somaliland government conducted an assessment of how the drought had affected women and children, and found that cases of gender-based violence had increased by 24 percent, with domestic violence, forced marriage, and girls dropping out of school being particularly notable. Hibo worked, as ActionAid Somaliland officer, leading a women-led emergency response to a drought and food crisis. Through this initiative, a network of 85 women's coalitions, 25 safe spaces, and 30 self-help groups helped women develop the skills to lead their community and protect other women against rising rights violations.
