= Amina Warsame =

Somali social scientist

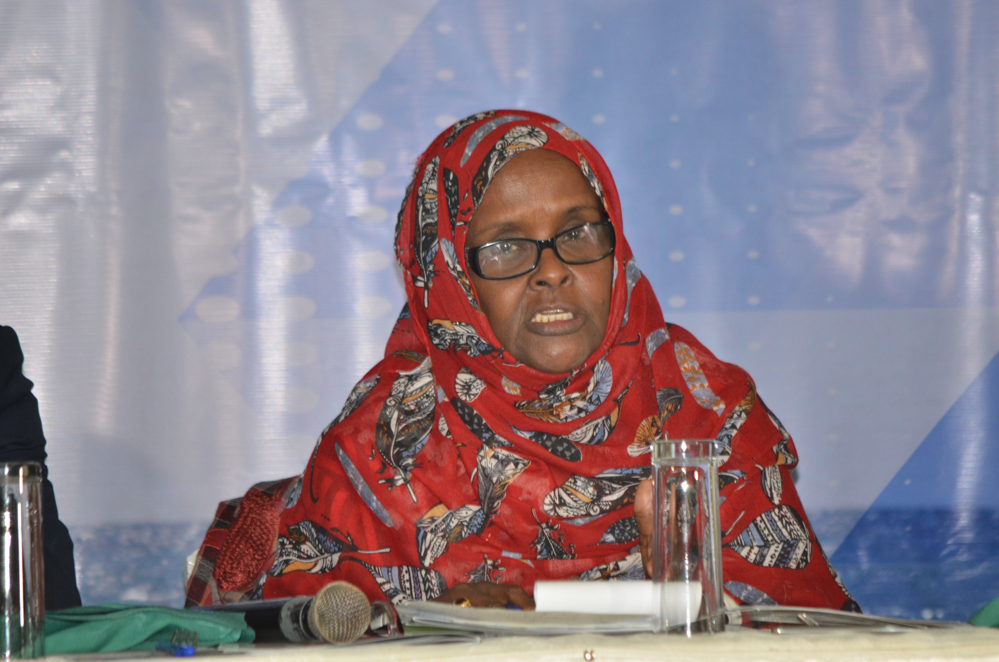
- Born: Somaliland
- Education: Master’s degree in human development, Institute of Social Studies, The Hague
- Occupations: Social scientist; women's rights advocate
- Organizations: Nagaad; Somaliland Women’s Research and Action Group (SOWRAG)
- Known for: Advocacy on women’s rights; research on female genital mutilation

Amina Mahmoud Warsame is a Somali social scientist who served as executive director of Nagaad, a women's group in Hargeisa Somaliland. Co-author of Social and Cultural Aspects of Female Circumcision and Infibulation: A Preliminary Report (1985), she was one of the early voices raised in Africa against female genital mutilation, along with Raqiya Abdalla, Asma El Dareer, Efua Dorkenoo, and Nahid Toubia.

Warsame lived in Sweden after fleeing Somalia to escape the Somali Civil War. She helped found the Somaliland Women's Research and Action Group (SOWRAG), and in 2005 she stood for a seat in Somaliland's parliament, one of the first women to do so.

== Education ==
Warsame was awarded a master's degree in human development by the Institute of Social Studies in The Hague.

== Selected works ==
- Warsame, Aamina; Ahmed, Sayida; Talle, Aud (1985). Social and Cultural Aspects of Female Circumcision and Infibulation: A Preliminary Report. Mogadishu: Somali Academy of Sciences and Arts. OCLC 31827718.
- Warsame, Amina Mohamoud (2004). Queens without Crowns: Somaliland women's changing roles and peace building. Uppsala, Sweden: Somaliland Women's Research and Action Group and Life & Peace Institute. ISBN 91-87748-55-X. OCLC 63135935.
- Warsame, Amina Mahmoud (September 2011). Female Genital Cutting: The Transition From Infibulation to Smaller Cutting in Somaliland. Oslo: Somaliland Women's Research and Action Group, Oslo University.
- Fried, Sarah; Warsame, Amina Mahmoud; et al. (2013). "Outpatients' perspectives on problems and needs related to female genital mutilation/cutting: a qualitative study from Somaliland". Obstetrics and Gynecology International. 2013 165893. doi:10.1155/2013/165893. PMC 3784275. PMID 24151505.
