= The Five Foundation =

The Five Foundation is an organisation working towards the elimination of the practice of female genital mutilation (FGM). It was founded by Nimco Ali and Brendan Wynne. It was launched in September 2019 in New York and currently has signed-up partners which include Plan International, Action Aid, The ONE Campaign, Save The Children (UK), UN Women (UK) and Women for Women International.

In 2019, The Five Foundation advocated to have FGM included in the UK Children's Act. The Foundation has also been active in raising awareness of a case of a Kenyan doctor's attempts to legalise FGM, persuading Sudan to ban FGM in May 2020, working on a fatwa banning child marriage in June 2019, communicating how the Covid-19 pandemic has increased the risk of FGM, and being a central player in getting the US Stop FGM Act passed in January 2021.

The Five Foundation also advocates for increased funding for grassroots African women's organisations and on the need to end the medicalisation of FGM.
