= Nimco Ali =

British social activist

Nimko Ali OBE
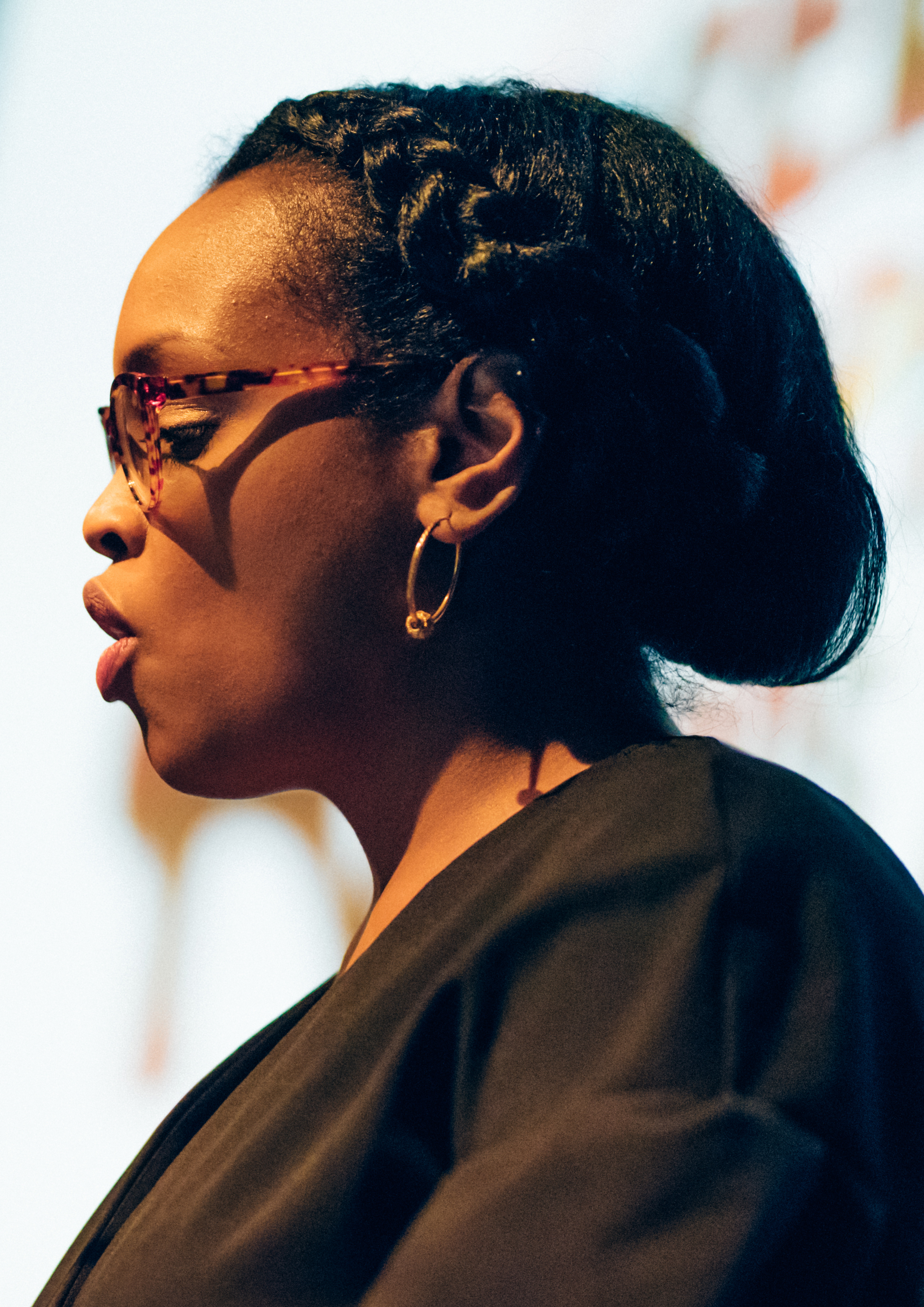
- Ali in 2019
- Born: 1982 or 1983 (age 43–44); Somali Democratic Republic
- Education: University of Bristol
- Occupations: Social activist; author
- Title: Co-founder and CEO of The Five Foundation

Nimko Ali OBE (Somali: Nimco Cali), alternatively spelled Nimco (born c. 1982), is a British social activist of Somali heritage. She is the co-founder and CEO of The Five Foundation, a global partnership to end female genital mutilation (FGM).

Ali underwent female genital mutilation in Djibouti. In 2019, she released her first book, which contains 42 stories from 152 interviews that Ali collected from women across 14 countries. Later that year, she co-founded The Five Foundation with Brendan Wynne, which is her current full-time role.

In 2020, she also co-founded the Ginsburg Women's Health Board with Mika Simmons. She contested a seat in the 2017 general election under the Women's Equality Party. In 2019, she supported Boris Johnson, endorsed the Conservative Party and campaigned for Conservative candidates. She was appointed as Independent Government Adviser for Tackling Violence Against Women and Girls in 2020, a post which ended in 2022.

== Early life ==
Ali was born c. 1983 in Somalia. When she was four, her family moved to Manchester in England and later moved to Cardiff, Wales. She has four brothers, one of whom, Mohamed, is chair of the Somali Conservatives. Aged seven, Ali underwent female genital mutilation (FGM) in Djibouti while on holiday with her family. She later suffered health complications and had to undergo reconstructive surgery. The experience, and meeting other females who had been incised later inspired her to assist at-risk girls and to call for the practice's eradication. Ali studied law at Bristol University.

== Career ==
In 2010, Ali along with psychotherapist Leyla Hussein founded Daughters of Eve. The non-profit organisation was established to help young women and girls, with a focus on providing education and raising awareness on female genital mutilation.

Ali co-founded The Five Foundation, "The Global Partnership to End FGM", with Brendan Wynne in 2019. This non-profit organisation works to raise the issue of FGM on the international agenda and leverage funding for grassroots organisations working to end FGM. Ali previously worked as a civil servant. She also served as a women's rights activist and an independent training consultant for a number of years. Additionally, Ali served as a Network Coordinator for The Girl Generation. She has also written extensively on national gender rights.

Her book What We’re Told Not to Talk About (But We're Going to Anyway): Women's Voices from East London to Ethiopia was published by Penguin Books in June 2019. It includes stories of women who are sharing experiences they have always been told should be "secret and shameful" as well as Ali's own story of living with FGM. The book contained 42 stories from 152 interviews that Ali had undertaken with women across 14 countries. In The Times, Hannah Betts described the book as "a compelling cross-cultural account of vaginal life". Isobel Shirlaw said in i that it was an important book and that "The chorus of women's voices which provide a multi-dimensional, global view of these hidden issues is powerful". The Guardian review by Arifa Akbar praised the book as "rich collection of intimate and uncensored stories" and wrote that Ali "delivers the physicality of the women's experiences with all the leaking, faecal, bloody mess of the body laid bare", although noting that "deeper reflection is lacking" and criticising the omission of coverage of anyone that was not heterosexual and cisgender. Ali told an interviewer from The Guardian that:

"Since the age of seven, when I started talking about my vagina after FGM, I was told that I should be ashamed. But I wouldn't have been talking about these things if FGM hadn't happened to me. FGM was the patriarchy's way of trying to break me and keep me silent, but it made me the loudest person in the room."

In 2020, Ali and Mika Simmons co-founded the Ginsburg Women's Health Board, to campaign for a more effective and equitable healthcare system for women from the National Health Service. The organisation is named after Ruth Bader Ginsburg.

In October 2020, then Home Secretary of the United Kingdom Priti Patel appointed Ali as an Independent Government Adviser for Tackling Violence Against Women and Girls. Ali was a direct appointment to the role, which, as is common with such roles, was not advertised. The role involves the formulation of a strategy to reduce violence against women and girls, with recommendations expected to be produced in 2021. The report, with forewords from Priti Patel and from Ali, was published in July 2021. Ali expressed her hope that the strategy would be a foundation to improve safety for women and girls through education and legislation, but that "whole system" change would be required to reduce violence. In December 2022 Ali said she does not want to serve under new Conservative Home Secretary Suella Braverman and was on a "completely different planet" to Braverman on women's rights and ethnic minorities.

== Political activity ==
At the 2017 general election, Ali contested the seat of Hornsey and Wood Green in North London for the Women's Equality Party. Ali polled 551 votes (0.9% of the total), finishing in 5th place out of the 8 candidates that stood and losing her election deposit. During the campaign, Ali's campaign workers received dozens of abusive and aggressive telephone calls, and Ali received a death threat.

Ali is godmother to the son of former UK prime minister Boris Johnson and his wife Carrie Johnson. She endorsed Johnson, whom she has referred to as a "real feminist", in the 2019 Conservative leadership election. During the 2019 general election, Ali campaigned on behalf of the Conservatives.

== Honours and awards ==
In 2014, Ali received the community/charity award, jointly with Leyla Hussein, at the 2014 Red Magazine Woman of the Year awards for their work with Daughters of Eve. They also placed sixth in the Woman's Hour Power List 2014. Ali was named one of BBC's 100 Women during 2018.

On International Women's Day 2019 it was announced that the 2019 Geneva Summit for Human Rights and Democracy’s International Women's Rights Award would be awarded to Ali for her "approach to ending FGM by offering holistic support to survivors of the practice". Ali was appointed Officer of the Order of the British Empire (OBE) in the 2019 Birthday Honours for services to tackling female genital mutilation and gender inequality.
