= This Is... (TV series) =

- Genre: Entertainment; Music
- Presented by: Reggie Yates (2011); Christine Bleakley (2012)
- Starring: Michael Bublé; JLS; Kylie Minogue; Justin Bieber; Lionel Richie
- Country of origin: United Kingdom
- Original language: English
- No. of episodes: 4

Production
- Production location: The London Studios
- Running time: 60 minutes (inc. adverts)

Original release
- Network: ITV
- Release: 4 December 2010 – 6 April 2012

Related
- ITV Specials; For the Last Time; One Night Only

This Is... is a British entertainment show, celebrating the best of British Music. Starring Michael Bublé, JLS, Justin Bieber and Lionel Richie, it was presented by various celebrity hosts including Christine Bleakley and Reggie Yates

== History ==
This Is JLS received 364,400 views. It was JLS's first television special and included hidden camera scenes in which the members gave unexpecting fans a pleasant surprise. Sally Wood was the series producer for This Is Justin Bieber, which had two million viewers. This Is Lionel Richie received 2.52 million views, which was over 500,000 viewers about the 1.92 million viewers ITV typically received.

== Reception ==
In a review of This Is Justin Bieber, The Sentinel's John Woodhouse "wasn't just about the singer drippily whining on about Christmas in a way that made you positively yearn for the return of the St Winifred's School Choir". Sam Richards of The Sunday Telegraph called This Is Lionel Richie a "curious rockumentary-cum-puff-profile" in which he looks at Baltic Triangle in Birmingham and chats with Britain's table tennis team.

== Episodes ==
#	Date Aired	Starring	Presenter
1	4 December 2010	Michael Bublé	—N/a
2	11 December 2010	JLS & Kylie Minogue	—N/a
3	10 December 2011	Justin Bieber	Reggie Yates
4	6 April 2012	Lionel Richie	Christine Bleakley
