= Ninja Warrior UK series 3 =

Season of British realty/sport competition television series Ninja Warrior UK

Ninja Warrior UK
- Series 3
- Presented by: Ben Shephard; Chris Kamara; Rochelle Humes
- No. of contestants: 250
- Finals venue: Manchester Central
- No. of episodes: 8

Release
- Original network: ITV
- Original release: 31 December 2016 – 18 February 2017

Series chronology
- ← Previous; Series 2 Next → Series 4

Series Three of Ninja Warrior UK, a British physical obstacle assault course game show, was aired on ITV from 31 December 2016 to 18 February 2017. Of the 250 contestant who took part, this series' competition was won by Jonny Urszuly. During its broadcast, the series averaged around 3.81 million viewers.

== Series overview ==
=== Qualifier ===
In the course of the five qualifier rounds, the contestants faced a variety of different obstacles in each round, alongside Quintuple Steps and Warped Wall. The most common featured included Jump Hang - this series saw a few new variations on the obstacle - Floating Tiles, and Log Runner - this obstacle was new for this series. This series saw the introduction of new obstacles used on the course - Silk Drop, Beam Cross, Pipe Climber, and Log Grip - as well as the use of UFO, Swing Circle, Swinging Frames, Double Tilt Ladder, Pole Rider, and Silk Slider.

Qualifier 1 Results

Rank	Finalist	Outcome	Time/Obstacle Reached
1	Sam Amos	Completed	00:58
2	Cameron Walker – Shepherd	Completed	00:59
3	Tanzil Umrani	Completed	00:59
4	Chris Lodge	Completed	01:03
5	Cain Clarke	Completed	01:21
6	Benjamin Rosser	Completed	01:37
7	Leon 'The Legend' Gabbidon	Completed	01:50
8	Javier 'Ninjengineer' Rivera	Completed	01:50
9	Liam Tomes	Completed	01:57
10	Saskia Neville	Completed	02:29

Qualifier 2 Results

Rank	Finalist	Outcome	Time/Obstacle Reached
1	Gareth Lloyd	Completed	01:33
2	Billy Morgan	Completed	01:33
3	Kim Thomas – Hird	Completed	01:47
4	Brian Cahill	Completed	01:56
5	Mat Armitage	Completed	02:14
6	Kane Woodhouse	Completed	02:50
7	Henry Cookey	Completed	03:38
8	Katie McDonnell	Completed	03:58
9	Mhairi Thorburn	Completed	04:24
10	Ryan Luney	Failed	Warped Wall

Qualifier 3 Results

Rank	Finalist	Outcome	Time/Obstacle Reached
1	Ed Scott	Completed	01:13
2	Ali Hay	Completed	01:32
3	Kenneth Orenuga	Completed	01:42
4	Jonny Urszuly	Completed	01:43
5	Fred Dorrington	Completed	01:59
6	Mosa Kambule	Completed	02:07
7	Nicola Kinche	Completed	02:24
8	Chris Bernard	Completed	02:32
9	CJ Jones	Completed	02:33
10	Ricky Moakes	Completed	02:58

Qualifier 4 Results

Rank	Finalist	Outcome	Time/Obstacle Reached
1	Matt McCreary	Completed	01:23
2	Bruce Winfield	Completed	01:24
3	Dion Trigg	Completed	01:29
4	Andrew Julien	Completed	01:32
5	Liam Cook	Completed	01:42
6	Alvin Loh	Completed	01:51
7	Jacob Peregrine – Wheller	Completed	02:05
8	Chris West	Completed	02:06
9	Steve Frew	Completed	02:15
10	Clinton Purnell	Completed	02:22

Qualifier 5 Results

Rank	Finalist	Outcome	Time/ Obstacle Reached
1	James Birchall	Completed	01:37
2	Umy Shujaudin	Completed	01:45
3	Hari Eustace	Completed	02:22
4	Chris De Stefano	Completed	02:45
5	Jack Bailey	Completed	02:49
6	Charlie Martin	Completed	03:03
7	Chris Viner	Completed	04:06
8	Sian Maycock	Failed	Warped Wall
9	Nicola Screawn	Failed	Warped Wall
10	Hayley Wray	Failed	Beam Cross

=== Semi-finals ===
For the top 50 go to 9 obstacles on 2 Semi-Finals. The Stage 1 is Quintuple Steps, Ring Swing, Spinning Log, Jump Hang With Trumpette, Ring Slider, and Warped Wall. Complete the Stage 1 within 3 minutes, go to Stage 2 on: Big Dipper, Pole Grapser, and Chimney Climb. And the end 2 Semi-Finals, top 15 fastest go to Final.

Semi-finals results

Rank	Finalist	Outcome	Time
1	Ed Scott	Completed	02:09
2	Cameron Walker-Shepherd	Completed	02:10
3	Bruce Winfield	Completed	02:21
4	Jonny Urszuly	Completed	02:38
5	James Birchall	Completed	02:42
6	Fred Dorrington	Completed	02:45
7	Clinton Purnell	Completed	02:47
8	Ali Hay	Completed	02:48
9	Steve Frew	Completed	02:55
10	Jacob Peregrine – Wheller	Completed	03:00
11	Leon Gabiddon	Completed	03:01
12	Nicholas Kinche	Completed	03:01
13	Mat Armitage	Completed	03:06
14	Cain Clarke	Completed	03:06
15	Chris West	Completed	03:10

=== Final ===
For the finals of this series, all three stages of obstacles were conducted. Stage 1 required the finalists to complete 9 obstacles - Quadruple Steps, Rolling Log, Coin Flip, Ring Jump, Wind Chimes, Warped Wall, Big Dipper With Tassels, Three Logs, and Chimney Climb - within 6 minutes. Of the finalists that took on this stage, only 6 successfully completed it: Jacob Peregrine – Wheller, Ali Hay, Fred Dorrington, Bruce Winfield, Cain Clarke, and Jonny Urszuly.

Stage 2 required the remaining finalists to take on 5 obstacles - Spider Jump, Spin Cycle, Salmon Ladder, Monkey Pegs, and Wall Lift - and complete them within 2 minutes. Of the remaining finalists, only Clarke and Urszuly managed to complete it successfully.

For Stage 3, the remaining two finalists had to complete 3 obstacles, but with no time limit - Crazy Cliff Hanger, Floating Boards, and Flying Bars. Neither contestant managed to complete the stage, thus the winner was determined by progress, resulting in Urszuly being declared the winner.

== Ratings ==
Episode	Air date	Viewers (millions)	ITV weekly ranking
Heat 1	31 December 2016	3.37	28
Heat 2	7 January 2017	3.81	25
Heat 3	14 January 2017	3.85	27
Heat 4	21 January 2017	3.75	27
Heat 5	28 January 2017	3.87	20
Semi–Final 1	4 February 2017	3.89	19
Semi–Final 2	11 February 2017	4.15	16
Final	18 February 2017	4.18	17
