= Ninja Warrior UK series 4 =

Season of British realty/sport competition television series Ninja Warrior UK

Ninja Warrior UK
- Series 4
- Presented by: Ben Shephard; Chris Kamara; Rochelle Humes
- No. of contestants: 250
- Finals venue: Manchester Central
- No. of episodes: 8

Release
- Original network: ITV
- Original release: 14 April – 9 June 2018

Series chronology
- ← Previous; Series 3

Series Four of Ninja Warrior UK, a British physical obstacle assault course game show, began airing on 14 April 2018. Unlike previous series, it was announced on 28 August 2017 that the competition would feature a selection of celebrity contestants, including Gethin Jones, Harry Judd, Jenni Falconer and Marvin Humes.

== Series overview ==
=== Qualifier ===
In the course of the four qualifier rounds, the contestants faced a variety of different obstacles in each round, alongside Floating Steps and Warped Wall. The most common featured included Jump Hang - this series saw a few new variations on the obstacle - Floating Steps, and Log Runner - this obstacle was new for this series. This series saw the introduction of new obstacles used on the course - Rope Climb, Floating Steps, Tick Tock and Bar Hop

Qualifier 1 Results

Rank	Finalist	Outcome	Time/Obstacle Reached
1	Tim Shieff	Completed	00:55
2	Owen "The Stuff" McKenzie	Completed	01:27
3	Matt Varela-Christie	Completed	01:35
4	Jahmal Germain	Completed	01:57
5	Anthony Vaquero-Stainer	Completed	02:04
6	Sébastien Foucan	Completed	02:23
7	Sam West	Completed	02:24
8	Dean Cheetham	Completed	02:27
9	Richard Gardner	Completed	02:34
10	Jonny Urszuly	Failed	Flying Shelf Grab
11	Colin Peck	Failed	Flying Shelf Grab
12	Andrew Slater	Failed	Flying Shelf Grab
13	David Baptiste	Failed	Flying Shelf Grab
14	Beth Lodge	Failed	Flying Shelf Grab
15	Johann Drayne	Failed	Cargo with Tyre

Qualifier 2 Results

Rank	Finalist	Outcome	Time/Obstacle Reached
1	Deren Perez	Completed	01:22
2	Cain Clarke	Completed	01:44
3	Jason Rose	Completed	01:56
4	Aaron Pursey	Completed	02:04
5	Jules Julien	Completed	02:35
6	Ryan Clamp	Completed	02:37
7	Ashley Bullock	Completed	02:40
8	Brendan Riley	Completed	02:47
9	Keith Fairburn	Completed	02:57
10	Jonathan Morris	Completed	03:07
11	Mhairi Thorburn	Completed	04:10
12	Greg Trevelyan	Completed	04:15
13	Joe Pulman	Failed	Ring Jump
14	Georgia Munroe	Failed	Ring Jump
15	Wendy Bradley	Failed	Ring Jump

Qualifier 3 Results

Rank	Finalist	Outcome	Time/Obstacle Reached
1	Tristan Steed	Completed	01:48
2	Ed Scott	Completed	01:51
3	Mike Snow	Completed	01:54
4	Aidan Roberts	Completed	02:23
5	Mohammad Moinuddin	Completed	02:46
6	Radzi Chinyanganya	Completed	03:13
7	Brad Wendes	Completed	03:37
8	Saskia Neville	Completed	03:53
9	Paul Connolly	Completed	04:06
10	Shao Dow	Completed	04:07
11	Ronnie Bonsra	Completed	04:14
12	David Paton	Completed	04:15
13	Monty Gupwell	Completed	05:31
14	Hayley Wray	Failed	Warped Wall
15	Marcus Morrison	Failed	Pipe Climber

Qualifier 4 Results

Rank	Finalist	Outcome	Time/Obstacle Reached
1	Greg Ball	Completed	01:28
2	Ali Hay	Completed	01:35
3	Owen Drew	Completed	02:40
4	Imogen Horrocks	Completed	03:32
5	Roshane Young	Failed	I-Beam Cross
6	Andrew Cronin	Failed	I-Beam Cross
7	Karl Brent	Failed	I-Beam Cross
8	Tom May	Failed	I-Beam Cross
9	Simone Ming	Failed	I-Beam Cross
10	Theo Andrews	Failed	I-Beam Cross
11	Joel King	Failed	I-Beam Cross
12	Ryan Tracey	Failed	I-Beam Cross
13	Chloe Henry	Failed	I-Beam Cross
14	Katie Birch	Failed	I-Beam Cross
15	Rob Hamilton	Failed	I-Beam Cross

=== Semi-finals ===
For the semi-finals of this series, the semi-finalists had to complete Stage 1 of the course within three minutes. Alongside the Floating Steps and Warped Wall, they also had to contend with Ring Swing, Broken Bridge, Bar Hop, and Wind Chimes. Upon completing the stage, they then faced the obstacles of Stage 2, consisting of Ring Slider, Spinning Log, and Rope Climb.

Semi-finals results

Rank	Finalist	Outcome	Time
1	Ali Hay	Completed	03:03
2	Owen "The Stuff" McKenzie	Completed	03:38
3	Tim Shieff	Completed	03:40
4	Jonny Urszuly	Completed	04:02
5	Dean Cheetham	Completed	04:05
6	Aidan Roberts	Completed	04:09
7	Deren Perez	Completed	04:21
8	Sam West	Completed	04:35
9	Jahmal Germain	Completed	04:39
10	Aaron Pursey	Completed	05:09
11	Brendan Riley	Failed	Rope Climb
12	Matt Varela-Christie	Failed	Spinning Log
13	Mike Snow	Failed	Spinning Log
14	Jason Rose	Failed	Ring Slider
15	Sébastien Foucan	Failed	Ring Slider
16	Saskia Neville	Failed	Ring Slider
17	Simone Ming	Failed	Warped Wall
18	Johann Drayne	Failed	Warped Wall
19	Hayley Wray	Failed	Wind Chimes
20	Joel King	Failed	Wind Chimes
21	Jules Julien	Failed	Wind Chimes
22	Theo Andrews	Failed	Wind Chimes
23	Jonathan Morris	Failed	Wind Chimes
24	Georgia Munroe	Failed	Wind Chimes
25	Imogen Horrocks	Failed	Wind Chimes
26	David Paton	Failed	Wind Chimes
27	Chloe Henry	Failed	Bar Hop
28	Cwen Drew	Failed	Bar Hop
29	Mohammad Moinuddin	Failed	Bar Hop
30	Ryan Clamp	Failed	Bar Hop

=== Final ===
Final 1 Results

Rank	Finalist	Outcome	Time
1	Tim Schieff	Completed	2:21 left
2	Ali Hay	Completed	2.10 left
3	Deren Perez	Completed	1.57 left
4	Jonny Urszuly	Completed	1.42 left
5	Brendan Riley	Completed	1.10 left
6	Sam West	Completed	1:09 left
7	Mike Snow	Completed	1.03 left
8	Sébastien Foucan	Completed	0.37 left

Final 2 Results

== Ratings ==
Episode	Air date	Viewers (millions)	ITV weekly ranking
Heat 1	14 April 2018	4.07	20
Heat 2	21 April 2018	2.86	25
Heat 3	28 April 2018	3.56	20
Heat 4	5 May 2018	2.97	30
Semi-Final 1	12 May 2018	3.50	19
Semi–Final 2	19 May 2018	N/A	N/A
Final 1	26 May 2018	N/A	N/A
Final 2	9 June 2018	2.81	18
