= Let Me Entertain You =

Let Me Entertain You may refer to:

== Film and television ==
- Let Me Entertain You (2006 TV series), a British daytime variety show
- Let Me Entertain You, an Irish TV talent show
- "Let Me Entertain You" (Desperate Housewives)

== Music ==
=== Albums ===
- Let Me Entertain You, a 1996 album by Ann-Margret
- Let Me Entertain You: Carol Burnett Sings, a 1964 album by Carol Burnett
- Let Me Entertain You (Amanda Lear album), a 2016 album by Amanda Lear

=== Songs ===
- "Let Me Entertain You" (Robbie Williams song)
- "Let Me Entertain You" (Gypsy song), a song from Gypsy: A Musical Fable by Jule Styne and Stephen Sondheim
- "Let Me Entertain You" (Queen song), from the 1978 album Jazz
- "Let Me Entertain You", a song by The Controllers
- "Let Me Entertain You", a song by Shakespears Sister from Hormonally Yours

== Other ==
- Let Me Entertain You Tour, a 2015 tour by Robbie Williams
- Let Me Entertain You, 1990 autobiography of David Brown
