= This Is... =

This Is... may refer to:

- This Is... (book series), a series of children's travel books by Miroslav Sasek
- This Is... (TV series), a British entertainment show
- This Is... Icona Pop, an album by Icona Pop
- This Is...24-7 Spyz!, an EP by 24-7 Spyz
- This Is...Brenda, an album by Brenda Lee
- This Is...TAT, an EP by TAT
- "This Is", a song by Grace Jones from the 2008 album Hurricane
