= One Night Only (TV series) =

- Genre: Entertainment
- Presented by: Joanna Lumley (2014); Rob Brydon (2014); Christine Bleakley (2011); Fearne Cotton (2010); Ben Shephard (2009–10); Myleene Klass (2008)
- Starring: Various acts
- Country of origin: United Kingdom
- Original language: English
- No. of episodes: 8

Production
- Running time: 60 minutes (inc. adverts)

Original release
- Network: ITV
- Release: 5 December 2009 – present

Related
- ITV Specials; For the Last Time

One Night Only is a British variety show which aired on Saturday nights on ITV.

Myleene Klass hosted the first episode in December 2008 with the singer Tom Jones. Ben Shephard hosted in 2009 and 2010, which saw Rod Stewart and Phil Collins take to the stage. In November 2010, Fearne Cotton hosted a one-off special with Bon Jovi and in 2011 presented by Christine Bleakley featuring music from Duran Duran. Another episode aired in November 2014, with Rob Brydon hosting Neil Diamond: One Night Only. Joanna Lumley presented the seventh episode with Bette Midler in December 2014. The 2008 Christmas special, which had Milton Jones, Will Smith and Cerys Matthews was directed by Geoff Posner and produced by David Tyler for Pozzitive Television.

== Episodes ==
#	Date Aired	Starring	Presenter	Ref.
1	20 December 2008	Tom Jones	Myleene Klass	
2	5 December 2009	Rod Stewart	Ben Shephard	
3	18 September 2010	Phil Collins	Ben Shephard	
4	6 November 2010	Bon Jovi	Fearne Cotton	
5	20 March 2011	Duran Duran	Christine Bleakley	
6	13 November 2014	Neil Diamond	Rob Brydon	
7	15 December 2014	Bette Midler	Joanna Lumley	
8	9 December 2016	Michael Ball & Alfie Boe	Michael Ball & Alfie Boe	
