= Something for the Weekend (game show) =

- Genre: Game show
- Presented by: Denise van Outen
- Country of origin: United Kingdom
- Original language: English
- No. of series: 2
- No. of episodes: 13 (inc. 2 specials)

Production
- Running time: 30 minutes (inc. adverts)
- Production company: Tiger Aspect Productions in association with Whack 'em Out Productions

Original release
- Network: Channel 4
- Release: 17 September 1999 – 21 July 2000

Something for the Weekend is a British game show presented by Denise van Outen. It was broadcast on Channel 4 from 17 September 1999 to 21 July 2000.

Well-remembered items on the show included a game called Private Dicks and van Outen revealing she used the pet name Godzilla for then-partner Jay Kay's privates, because he "takes [her] deeper underground".

== Transmissions ==
Series	Start date	End date	Episodes
1	17 September 1999	22 October 1999	6
2	2 June 2000	21 July 2000	7

=== Specials ===
Date	Entitle
24 December 1999	Christmas Special
7 January 2000	Denise's Naughty Bits: The Best of Something for the Weekend

== Reception ==
The show was critically panned. Since then van Outen has distanced herself from the show.
