= Who Dares, Sings! =

- Genre: Game show, Music
- Presented by: Ben Shephard; Denise Van Outen
- Country of origin: United Kingdom
- Original language: English
- No. of series: 1
- No. of episodes: 7

Production
- Executive producer: Rachel Ashdown
- Producers: Ruben Ray-Choudhuri; Matt Pritchard
- Production location: The London Studios
- Running time: 60 minutes (including adverts)
- Production company: ITV Productions

Original release
- Network: ITV
- Release: 28 June – 9 August 2008

Who Dares, Sings! is a karaoke style game show airing in the United Kingdom on the ITV Network and in the Republic of Ireland on TV3 Ireland. It premiered at 20:00 BST on 28 June 2008 and was hosted by Ben Shephard and Denise Van Outen. Only seven episodes have been shown in one series. Tickets were offered for a Christmas special, but this has not aired and will probably never do so.

== Format ==
The studio audience of 100 people all attempt to sing to win a potential jackpot of £50,000. In the first round, all 100 people sing along to a song, but five performances of the song are selected at random and judged by a super computer called SAM (short for Sound Analysis Machine). The two that score the highest go through to a "pitch battle", for a place in the semi-final round.

These two will then pick a song each from a "karaoke songbook", and will then perform it. The main idea of the game it to hit and hold the "hot notes", as close to the original song as possible. The one who scores the highest out of 100 goes through to the semi-final round. This is repeated for both the second pitch battle and the semi-final round.

The winner of the semi-final round, then goes forward to the final. They are given a choice of five songs and can sing at maximum three of them. For the first song, they'll score 40 or more to win £5,000, the second song is worth £25,000 if they score 60 or higher, and the third song is worth the £50,000 jackpot, if they score 80 or more. After the second and third songs, the finalist is given the choice to take the money they've got at that stage or gamble. If they gamble and fail to reach the score target, they'll leave with nothing.

The design of the studio set was very similar to the set of Catchphrase during years when Roy Walker was the presenter.

== Show winners ==
As of the end of episode 4, there have been no £50,000 winners.

== Cancellation ==
The second series of Who Dares, Sings! did not broadcast in 2009 or subsequent years.

== Ratings ==
Episode 1 – 3.90m (19.59)

Episode 2 – 4.14m (20.13)

Episode 3 – 3.70m (20.00)

Episode 4 – 3.66m (20.11)

Episode 5 – 3.40m (19.55)

Episode 6 – 3.07m (20.19)

Episode 7 – 3.25m (18.59)
