= Off the Beaten Track (TV series) =

- Genre: Travel
- Presented by: Christine Bleakley
- Country of origin: United Kingdom
- Original language: English
- No. of series: 1
- No. of episodes: 6

Production
- Running time: 30 minutes (inc. adverts)

Original release
- Network: ITV
- Release: 1 November – 13 December 2013

Related
- Wild Ireland

Off the Beaten Track is a British travel documentary show that aired on ITV from 1|11|to 13|12|2013, presented by Christine Bleakley.

In the series, Bleakley "discovered Britain's hidden gems", by travelling to places that are not generally considered tourist attractions. It was reported that she was inspired by "her love of Britain and a childhood spent holidaying at home". She said of the series: "When we first discussed ideas for the series, I happened to mention that I had never had a foreign holiday until I was 18. I always holidayed at home and we travelled the length and breadth of Ireland and Scotland. I have a real appreciation of what is around us and this series is reminding people what a beautiful part of the world we live in. I loved every minute filming the show as it really was such a lovely, happy time."

Bleakley said she would "love" to make a second series, but in March 2014, it was announced that a second series would not be commissioned. A source for the show said, "It simply wasn't as strong as similar rival shows, and there's no chance of it returning."

== Episodes ==
No.	Location	Original release date	Notes
1	Derbyshire	1 November 2013	
2	Essex and Suffolk border	8 November 2013	
3	Northern Ireland	22 November 2013	
4	Herefordshire	29 November 2013	
5	Shropshire	6 December 2013	
6	Fife	13 December 2013	
