= Ninja Warrior UK =

British reality/sport competition television series

- Also known as: Ninja Warrior UK: Race for Glory (2022)
- Created by: Ushio Higuchi
- Directed by: Paul Kirrage (2015–2019); John L. Spencer (2022)
- Presented by: Ben Shephard; Chris Kamara; Rochelle Humes
- Voices of: Bruce Hammal
- Theme music composer: Paul Farrer
- Country of origin: United Kingdom
- Original language: English
- No. of series: 6
- No. of episodes: 49

Production
- Executive producers: Michael Kelpie (2015–2022); Martin Scott (2015–2022); Simon Marsh (2015–2019); Helen Tumbridge (2022)
- Production location: Manchester Central
- Running time: 60 minutes (inc. adverts)
- Production company: Potato

Original release
- Network: ITV
- Release: 11 April 2015 – 29 October 2022

Related
- Sasuke; American Ninja Warrior; Ultimate Beastmaster

Ninja Warrior UK (also known as Ninja Warrior UK: Race for Glory) is a British physical obstacle assault course game show, created for ITV that ran from 2015 to 2022. The show is based upon the format of the Japanese game show Sasuke, created by Ushio Higuchi, which is aired in the United Kingdom and other countries as Ninja Warrior.

Presented by Ben Shephard, Chris Kamara and Rochelle Humes, the show focuses on around 250 contestants (160 in series 4–5) tackling a difficult assault course featuring a variety of obstacles, the most notable being the Warped Wall. Contestants advance in the competition by achieving a fast enough time or progressing far enough along the course. The competition culminates with a final, in which the contestant who goes furthest fastest is declared "Last Ninja Standing". If a competitor completes the final obstacle, Mt Midoriyama, in under 45 seconds, they will be declared winner of the contest and crowned "Ninja Warrior UK".

Dubbed the "Toughest course on TV", the show originally aired five series between 2015 and 2019, including one celebrity special episode aired as part of the Text Santa telethon on 18 December 2015. The first competitor to complete the entire course was Tim Champion, beating Mt Midoriyama in the fifth series. After a three-year hiatus, the show came back for a sixth series in September 2022, this time under the name Ninja Warrior UK: Race for Glory, which featured contestants racing against each other. Beth Lodge and Fred Dorrington are the final champions, beating Midoriyama in the finale series (Race for Glory). On 7 November 2024, the show was cancelled by ITV.

== Format ==
In the show's original run, the competition was divided into three main stages - the heats, the semi-finals, and the final. Despite the show being based upon Sasuke, the assault course used on the programme featured obstacles primarily from American Ninja Warrior.

In the Heats, competitors would attempt a six obstacle course, starting with the "Quintuple Steps" in series 1–3 or the "Floating Steps" in series 4–5 and always culminating with the "Warped Wall". The other four featured obstacles would vary between the individual heat episodes. In series 1-3, 50 competitors took part in one of five heats, with the top 10 advancing to the semi-finals. In series 4–5, the number of heat episodes was reduced to four, with the top 15 advancing in series 4 and only those who beat the wall advancing in series 5.

After the qualifiers, the remaining competitors would be split evenly between two semi-finals, and tackle a nine obstacle course. Unlike the qualifiers, the first six obstacles must be completed within a set time-limit, but competitors can then freely tackle the remaining three obstacles in their own time. The top 15 competitors across both semi-finals would move on to the final, based on who got the furthest or achieved the fastest time. In series 4, due to a larger number of semi-finalists, the top 30 competitors would advance to the finals. In series 5, this number was reduced to 20.

Once in the final, the finalists tackle four separate stages of obstacles. They must complete the entire course to advance to the next stage. In Stage 1, competitors attempt a nine-obstacle course with a strict time limit. From series 4, Stage 1 was rebranded to the "Eliminator" and aired in a separate episode from Stages 2 onwards. Stage 2 is also timed and the remaining contestants attempt five obstacles. Stage 3 is an untimed three-obstacle course, following directly from Stage 2, and consists of three obstacles. In recent years, these obstacles have varied very little and include the Crazy Cliffhanger, Spider Flip and Flying Bar. The final stage of the finals is a 22-meter rope climb, on (fictional) "Mount Midoriyama", which must be completed in under 45 seconds. Should a competitor complete this, they have then achieved total victory and are declared "Ninja Warrior UK". In the event that no competitor completes the final course, the competitor who goes furthest along the course in the fastest time is declared "Last Ninja Standing".

The show's format features a similar approach to that of Total Wipeout, in that footage in episodes focuses on the highlights of runs by contestants. Commentary of a contestant's run is mainly done by Shephard and Kamara, while Humes would often interview contestants before their run, and occasionally if they failed a run; in some instances, if a contestant's run was successful, especially during the qualifiers, the interview would be handled by Shephard and Kamara.

== Series overview ==
Series	Start date	End date	Episodes	Top Contestant	
1	11 April 2015	30 May 2015	8	Tim Shieff	
2	2 January 2016	13 February 2016	8	Owen McKenzie	
3	31 December 2016	18 February 2017	8	Jonny Urszuly	
4	14 April 2018	9 June 2018	8	Tim Shieff	
5	13 April 2019	1 June 2019	8	Tim Champion	
Series	Start date	End date	Episodes	Female Top Contestant	Male Top Contestant
6	10 September 2022	29 October 2022	8	Beth Lodge	Fred Dorrington

Indicates competitor(s) completed the Mount Midoriyama rope climb (total victory) and was declared "Ninja Warrior UK", the winner's title.

=== Series 1 (2015) ===
The first series of Ninja Warrior UK aired in 2015, from 11 April to 30 May. 250 competitors competed across five qualifying heats, with the top ten in each heat advancing to the semi-finals. In the semi-finals, the remaining field was split into two, with 7 places in the final available in each of the two semi-finals for the competitors who had advanced furthest along the course in the fastest time.

Of the 14 contestants that made it to the final, 6 completed Stage 1 but none managed to complete Stage 2. As a result, the winner was declared as Timothy Shieff, who managed to go the furthest. The series drew favourable viewing figures, leading ITV to renew the show for a second series on 29 May 2015.

=== Series 2 (2016) ===
The second series of Ninja Warrior UK aired in 2016, from 2 January to 13 February. Much like in series 1, the show started with 250 competitors competing across five qualifying heats. A change was made in the semi-finals, whereby the top 15 across both semi-finals combined would advance to the final.

Of the 15 contestants that made it to the final, only three finalists made it to the second stage before failing on the same obstacle. Of these three, Owen McKenzie was declared the "Last Ninja Standing", having managed to go the furthest.

=== Series 3 (2017) ===
The third series of Ninja Warrior UK aired from 31 December 2016 to 18 February 2017. The format remained unchanged from series 2, however the course saw a significant change in obstacles from previous series, especially from the semi-finals onwards. Many competitors from previous series were also not invited back, with only five returning competitors across the series.

Of the 15 contestants that made it to the final, six completed Stage 1, and only two completed Stage 2 before failing on the Crazy Cliffhanger in Stage 3. Of these two, Jonny Urzuly was declared the "Last Ninja Standing", having gone the furthest on the obstacle.

=== Series 4 (2018) ===
The fourth series of Ninja Warrior UK aired from 14 April to 2 June 2018. Unlike previous series, it was announced on 28 August 2017 that the competition would feature a selection of celebrity contestants, including Gethin Jones, Harry Judd, Jenni Falconer, and Marvin Humes competing alongside members of the general public.

The format also saw changes, with the number of heats reduced from five to four. As a result, the top 15 competitors in each heat advanced to the semi-finals. Due to the larger number of semi-finalists, 30 places were available in the eliminator, previously known as stage 1 of the final.

Of the 30 finalists, 8 completed Stage 1, 5 completed Stage 2 and none completed Stage 3. Tim Shieff was declared "Last Ninja Standing", failing the Flying Bar.

=== Series 5 (2019) ===
The fifth series of Ninja Warrior UK aired from 13 April to 1 June 2019. This series followed a similar structure to series 4 and saw many competitors from previous series return alongside new competitors. In the heats, only those who climbed the wall would advance to the semi-finals. During the semi-finals, the number of places available in the eliminator was reduced to 20.

Of the 20 finalists, 15 completed Stage 1, 8 completed Stage 2, and 1 completed Stages 3 and 4. The winner was Tim Champion, who became the first UK competitor to attempt and complete the Mount Midoriyama rope climb within 45 seconds, doing so with just 1 second to spare. Among the competitors were one-legged trainer Tyler Saunders.

This was the show's final series before its three-year hiatus; on 11 August 2020, Kamara revealed that ITV had no plans to commission a new series, thus marking the end of the series.

=== Series 6 (2022) ===
In February 2022, three years after the end of the show's original run, it was announced that the show would return later that year for a sixth series.

The sixth series, known as Ninja Warrior UK: Race for Glory, was filmed in August 2022 at Manchester Central, and began airing on 10 September 2022. The format was changed to introduce knockout head-to-head races, with contestants facing off against each other and a team of professional course testers in a knockout-style competition.

== Celebrity special ==
On 18 December 2015, a special celebrity edition of Ninja Warrior UK was aired in association with the Text Santa charity. The celebrities competed on a six-obstacle course, culminating with the Warped Wall; the winner was Louise Hazel.

Since 2018, celebrities have competed as part of the regular competition in the heats.

== Ratings ==
Series	Episodes	Premiered		Ended	
Series	Episodes	Date	Premiere viewers (in millions)	Date	Finale viewers (in millions)
1	8	11 April 2015	3.32	30 May 2015	4.08
2	8	2 January 2016	3.35	13 February 2016	3.72
3	8	31 December 2016	3.38	18 February 2017	4.18
4	8	14 April 2018	4.07	9 June 2018	2.81
5	8	13 April 2019	3.09	1 June 2019	3.85
6 (Race for Glory)	8	10 September 2022	2.60	29 October 2022	1.61

== Adventure Parks ==
Several indoor adventure parks using the Ninja Warrior UK branding have opened in cities across the UK, featuring obstacle courses inspired by the TV show.
