= 1 vs. 100 (British game show) =

British television game show

- Genre: Game show
- Based on: Eén tegen 100
- Presented by: Dermot O'Leary (2006–07); Ben Shephard (2008–09)
- Theme music composer: Augustin Bousfield
- Country of origin: United Kingdom
- Original language: English
- No. of series: 4
- No. of episodes: 32

Production
- Production locations: Fountain Studios (2006); The Maidstone Studios (2007–08); BBC Pacific Quay (2009)
- Running time: 45 minutes (2006-07); 50 minutes (2008–09)
- Production company: Initial

Original release
- Network: BBC One
- Release: 30 September 2006 – 23 May 2009

Related
- The National Lottery Draws

1 vs. 100 is a BBC National Lottery game show based on the original Dutch version called Eén tegen 100. It aired on BBC One from 30 September 2006 to 23 May 2009, with Dermot O'Leary hosting the first two series and Ben Shephard hosting the last two series.

== Format ==
A single contestant designated as The One competes against a panel of 100 people, collectively known as The 100. To win the game outright, the One must eliminate all members of the 100 by answering a series of questions correctly.

On each turn, the One selects one of two categories and the host asks a multiple-choice question with three answer options. The 100 are given six seconds to lock in their guesses, after which the One is asked for their answer. A correct response adds £1,000 to the bank for every member of the 100 who has missed it and eliminates all of them from the game. If the One successfully eliminates all 100 opponents, they win all the money in the bank plus a bonus of £50,000. However, an incorrect answer from the One at any time ends the game immediately and forfeits all the money. Unlike other editions, such as the American version of the same name, a loss by the One does not allow the surviving members of the 100 to split the bank. In addition, the One has no option to walk away and keep the banked money, but must play until one side or the other is defeated.

After answering the first question correctly, which must be answered to continue, the One is given three "dodges," each of which can be used to skip one question at the cost of cutting the bank in half. Members of the 100 who miss a dodged question are still eliminated, but no money is added to the bank. Once the One has eliminated over 75 opponents, one of the offered categories for the next turn becomes "Bonus Dodge," which awards one more dodge if chosen and answered correctly; however, this question cannot be dodged. In addition, the One may choose to double the value of any one question after the first, adding £2,000 to the bank for each opponent eliminated on that turn.

If all remaining members of the 100 miss the same question, the host announces this fact before revealing the correct answer and then gives the One a choice. They may either end the game and keep the banked money, including the payoff for all eliminated opponents on that turn, or play the question out in the hope of being correct and winning the £50,000 bonus in addition to the bank.

The potential top prize is £250,000, achievable if the One uses no dodges, eliminates every member of the 100 on a double-value question, answers it correctly, and chooses not to end the game.

For each new game, the One is chosen at random from the members of the 100 who avoided elimination in the last one, or from the entire 100 if all of them were eliminated.

== Transmissions ==
Series	Start date	End date	Episodes
1	30 September 2006	18 November 2006	8
2	13 January 2007	25 August 2007	8
3	19 April 2008	28 June 2008	8
4	28 March 2009	23 May 2009	8
