= Wild Ireland =

- Genre: Documentary
- Presented by: Christine Bleakley
- Country of origin: Ireland
- Original language: English
- No. of series: 1
- No. of episodes: 6

Production
- Executive producers: Jane Kelly; Philip McGovern
- Producer: Frank Agnew
- Editor: Ultan Murphy
- Running time: 30 minutes (inc. adverts)
- Production company: Big Mountain Productions

Original release
- Network: ITV
- Release: 13 April – 18 May 2015

Related
- Off The Beaten Track

Wild Ireland is an Irish travel documentary series that began airing on 13 April 2015 on ITV. It is presented by Christine Bleakley.

The series was filmed throughout 2014 and had the working title of Wild Atlantic Way.

== Awards ==
Wild Ireland won an IFTA Gala Television Award in the 'Factual' category in October 2015.

== Episodes ==
Official viewing figures are from BARB.

Episode	Original Air Date	Description	Viewers (millions)
1	13 April 2015	In the first episode, Christine starts at the most northerly point of Ireland. She learns the story of how Ireland first got its name before she drives, bikes, hikes, swims and kayaks her way along the coastline.	2.43
2	20 April 2015	In this episode, Christine climbs Knocknarea Mountain in County Sligo, Learns how to cut turf, explores sea arches and caves in a kayak and also visits Blacksod Lighthouse.	2.11
3	27 April 2015	In the third episode, Christine walks along the pilgrims trail to Ireland's holy mountain, Croagh Patrick, enjoys a surfing lesson on the wild Atlantic waves & visits Ireland's only fjord, Killary Harbour.	2.56
4	4 May 2015	This week, Christine learns to sail on the Galway Hooker, a traditional Irish vessel. She explores Ireland's most popular natural attraction, the Cliffs of Moher in County Clare which tower above the Atlantic and travels by ferry to the Aran Islands where she explores the landscape from a traditional pony and trap.	2.20
5	11 May 2015	Christine kayaks into the bay in search of one of County Kerry's most famous residents, a dolphin named Fungie. She explores Ireland's love of horse riding with a riding lesson on the beach and she join a band of local star-gazers at the Dark Sky Reserve, one of the darkest places on earth.	2.46
6	18 May 2015	In the last episode of the series, Christine travels across open ocean in Ireland's only cable car. On to Mizen Head, she explores the treacherous waters around Ireland's most south westerly point and joins the coastguard for the day.	2.02
