= Babes in the Wood (TV series) =

- Opening titles of Babes in the Wood
- Genre: Sitcom
- Starring: Karl Howman; Denise van Outen; Natalie Walter; Samantha Janus; Madeleine Curtis
- Country of origin: United Kingdom
- Original language: English
- No. of series: 2
- No. of episodes: 14

Production
- Running time: 13x30 minutes 1x45 minutes

Original release
- Network: ITV
- Release: 23 July 1998 – 24 August 1999

Babes in the Wood is a British sitcom that aired on ITV from 23 July 1998 to 24 August 1999. Starring Karl Howman and Denise van Outen, Babes in the Wood was written by Geoff Deane, Paul Alexander, Simon Braithwaite, Ian Searle and Fleur Costello.

== Cast ==
- Denise van Outen – Leigh Jackson
- Natalie Walter – Caralyn Monroe/Munroe
- Karl Howman – Charlie Lovall
- Mark Hayford – Benito
- Samantha Janus – Ruth Ford/Frause (series 1 and 1998 special)
- Madeleine Curtis – Francesca "Frankie" Fraiser-Jones (series 2)
- James Buller – Nick (series 2)

== Plot ==
Babes in the Wood revolves around three women in their 20s who share a flat in St John's Wood in London. Leigh is streetwise and tough, while Ruth is bossy and Caralyn is ditzy. In the flat next door lives Charlie Lovall, the former owner of a video shop whose divorce has cost him dearly, although he still has his Porsche. Leigh works as a waitress for public school-educated Benito at the nearby Bar Coda. Ruth marries an old millionaire and leaves after the first series and is replaced by would be model Frankie.

== Production ==
The creator and writer was Geoff Deane and it was produced by Lucky Dog, the company founded by Deane and producer Kenton Allen. Deane had got the germ of the concept from his play, Three Cups of Sugar that had toured in 1990, which focused on divorced and near-broke businessman Martin Lovall (Charlie Lovall in the TV series) forced to rent a downmarket flat; his three 'attractive young neighbours', although much mentioned by him, are never actually seen on-screen in that version. The show took a long time to get to the screen: it was in production for five years, with a pilot episode featuring an almost totally different cast, that was only broadcast in 2001 (after the TV series was discontinued) and a long casting process.

The show faced high expectations on its launch, due to the contemporary lack of good-quality mainstream British comedy and ITV's desire for a big hit. It was intended to rival the American show Friends, and ITV showed their confidence by ordering a Christmas special before the first series was broadcast.

== Critical reaction ==
Maggie Brown found it funny though a bit contrived and possibly unrealistic in its portrayal of the girls' living arrangements. She praised Van Outen's repartee with Hayford. Other reactions were less favourable. The Times called it "very shoddy". The Rough Guide to British Cult Comedy called it "hackneyed". The Daily Mirror was highly critical of Claire King's guest appearance.

In an overview of ITV programmes, Stuart Heritage named Babes in the Wood as one of the worst shows in the network's history. He described Babes in the Wood "a show where some babes live in St John’s Wood and literally nothing else happens"

== Episodes ==
=== Series one (1998) ===
1. Episode One (23 July 1998)
2. Episode Two (30 July 1998)
3. Episode Three (6 August 1998)
4. Episode Four (13 August 1998)
5. Episode Five (20 August 1998)
6. Episode Six (27 August 1998)

=== Christmas special (1998) ===
- Christmas Special (45 minutes) (30 December 1998)

=== Series two (1999) ===
1. Episode One (13 July 1999)
2. Episode Two (20 July 1999)
3. Episode Three (27 July 1999)
4. Episode Four (3 August 1999)
5. Episode Five (10 August 1999)
6. Episode Six (17 August 1999)
7. Episode Seven (24 August 1999)
