= Denise van Outen =

English actress and television presenter (born 1974)

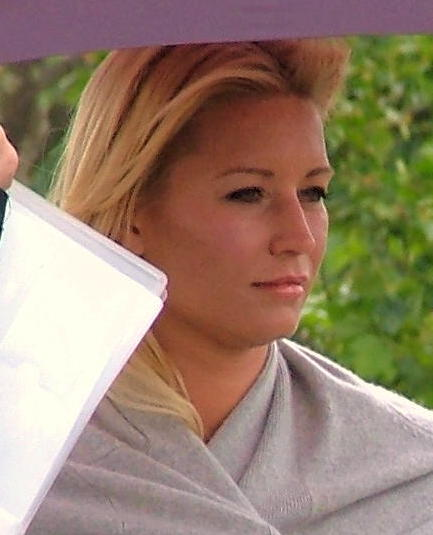
- Van Outen in 2007
- Born: Denise Kathleen Outen; 27 May 1974 (age 52); Basildon, Essex, England
- Occupations: Actress; singer; dancer; presenter
- Years active: 1986–present
- Television: The Big Breakfast; Babes in the Wood; Any Dream Will Do; Who Dares, Sings!; Born to Shine; Strictly Come Dancing; EastEnders; Loose Women; Ireland's Got Talent; Celebrity Gogglebox; The Masked Singer; Neighbours; Dancing on Ice
- Spouse: Lee Mead (m. 2009; div. 2015)
- Partner(s): Jay Kay (1998–2001), Eddie Boxshall (2014–2022)
- Children: 1

Denise van Outen (born Denise Kathleen Outen; 27 May 1974) is an English actress, singer, dancer and presenter. She presented The Big Breakfast, played Roxie Hart in the musical Chicago both in the West End and on Broadway and finished as runner-up in the tenth series of the BBC One dancing show Strictly Come Dancing.

She was a judge on Any Dream Will Do in 2007, Born to Shine in 2011, and Ireland's Got Talent which ran for two seasons (2018–2019). Van Outen also narrates the ITV2 reality television series The Only Way Is Essex.

== Early life ==
Denise Kathleen Outen was born in Basildon, Essex. She claims that her ancestors "are all Dutch", which was the reason she added "van" into her name. At the age of seven, she began modelling for knitting patterns, and showed an early flair for performing. This resulted in her attending the Sylvia Young Theatre School.

In 1986, she played the young Éponine in Les Misérables (the role paid her school fees), the Anthony Newley-directed production of Stop the World - I Want to Get Off, and A Midsummer Night's Dream with the Royal Shakespeare Company.

== Career ==
=== Early career ===
As a teenager, van Outen had brief roles on a number of television dramas; these included Kappatoo and The Bill. In 1992, she appeared in a Drinking and Driving Wrecks Lives commercial. She also performed backing vocals with Melanie Blatt for the band Dreadzone. In the mid-1990s, she sang with former video game soundtrack singer Cathy Warwick in a 'girl group' called Those2Girls, by which time she had become Denise van Outen. Those2Girls were signed to BMG's Final Vinyl record label and had a minor Top 40 hit in 1995, called "All I Want".

=== Acting ===
During her first stint on The Big Breakfast show, she appeared as Jill in ITV1's version of the pantomime Jack and the Beanstalk alongside Julie Walters and Neil Morrissey. Wanting to further develop her acting career, she left The Big Breakfast at the end of 1998. In 1999, she appeared on several episodes of The Bill and The Young Person's Guide To Becoming A Rock Star, the BBC's Murder in Mind short series of crime dramas, and on 2 series of Babes in the Wood with Karl Howman and Samantha Janus.

Van Outen has also appeared in film, initially as Maureen in the crime comedy Love, Honour and Obey. In the anthology film Tube Tales, set on the London Underground, she played the lead character of Alex in the "Horny" segment, directed by Stephen Hopkins. Van Outen has played a small role in the romantic comedy Are You Ready For Love?

She first played Roxie Hart on the stage in the hit musical Chicago at the Adelphi Theatre in the West End in April 2001. Her run proved a hit with theatre-goers, selling out for the entire 20 weeks. Unknown in the United States, she reprised her role on Broadway in the spring of 2002, before returning to the show's London version in late April 2002. Late the same year, Van Outen appeared as one of many special guest stars in a performance of The Play What I Wrote once again in London's West End.

In 2003, she returned to the London stage at the Gielgud Theatre in Andrew Lloyd Webber's one-woman show Tell Me on a Sunday, which he reworked for her. She was a huge success and the show ran for nearly a year. She then joined the cast of the established ITV sentimental drama Where the Heart Is as one of the lead characters, playing single mother Kim Blakeney, continuing for two series.

Van Outen played Maureen in the 2007 London revival of Rent Remixed directed by William Baker until 22 December. She was forced to cancel some performances owing to a throat infection. In July 2009, van Outen played Mary in Hotel Babylon for the BBC. Her character was at the hotel for a science convention. In August 2009, van Outen made her Edinburgh Festival Fringe debut in Blondes, a show by Jackie Clune.

Van Outen took over the role of Paulette Bonafonté from Jill Halfpenny in the West End production of Legally Blonde on 25 October 2010. She continued in the role for 6 months. In 2012, Van Outen was cast in the film of the Ray Cooney farce Run for Your Wife alongside Danny Dyer, Sarah Harding and Neil Morrissey. In 2013, she co-wrote the one-woman musical play Some Girl I Used To Know with Terry Ronald, which she will tour in from January 2014.

In February 2015, it was announced that Van Outen would be joining the cast of EastEnders. Van Outen plays intelligent businesswoman Karin Smart who gets involved with Max Branning (Jake Wood), and has business history with Phil Mitchell (Steve McFadden). In August 2015, Van Outen performed the title role in a concert performance of the musical Sweet Charity at Cadogan Hall, with actor/singer Michael Xavier, her SCD co-star, ex-Girls Aloud band member Kimberley Walsh, and West End star Kerry Ellis.

In September 2018, it was announced that she would be joining the cast of the 2018 London revival of Chicago at the Phoenix Theatre in the West End as Velma Kelly. Due to start rehearsals on 10 September 2018, in preparation for her first performance on 24 September, it was discovered that Van Outen had suffered a stress fracture in her heel, postponing her return to the production with her new dates yet to be announced.

Van Outen joined the cast of Australian soap opera Neighbours as Prudence Wallace in June 2019. She filmed her first scenes alongside cast members Stefan Dennis and Rebekah Elmaloglou in London, before flying out to join the cast at the serial's Melbourne studios. Her first scenes aired in September 2019.

=== Television appearances ===
In 2007, Van Outen co-presented Who Dares, Sings! with Ben Shephard and in 2008 she fronted Sky1's Hairspray: The School Musical. She currently narrates the ITVBe series The Only Way Is Essex.

Van Outen guest presented This Morning in 2005, The Friday Night Project in 2006, The 5 O'Clock Show in 2010, Lorraine in 2010 and 2012, and Sunday Brunch in 2013. She was a judge on the 2011 series Born to Shine. She was a guest panellist on an episode of Loose Women in 2014 and became a regular panellist on the show in September 2017.

Van Outen has been the presenter of Matalan Presents: The Show since 2016. On 30 August 2017, she was announced as one of the four judges on the first season of Ireland's Got Talent in 2018. In 2020, she competed in the ITV singing competition The Masked Singer as 'Fox', where she placed fifth.

=== Radio ===
On 4 February 2008, van Outen reunited with her former Big Breakfast partner Johnny Vaughan as co-host of Capital Breakfast on Capital Radio. On 29 July 2008, she quit the show, halfway through her contract, because of TV commitments and the early mornings. However, in April 2011 van Outen said that she left the show because relations between her and Vaughan had soured. She claims Vaughan has not spoken to her since. In spring 2013, van Outen started presenting her own Saturday afternoon radio show on London's Magic 105.4, airing between 1:00 pm and 3:00 pm.

=== Strictly Come Dancing ===
In September 2012, van Outen was announced as one of the celebrities competing on the tenth series of Strictly Come Dancing. She partnered with professional dancer James Jordan. The couple secured top of the leaderboard 7 times. However, controversy arose when viewers criticised her participation in the competition because of the advantage of having had previous stage experience. On 20 December 2012, van Outen and Jordan finished as runners-up alongside Girls Aloud singer Kimberley Walsh and Pasha Kovalev, behind winning couple, Olympic gymnast Louis Smith and Flavia Cacace.

=== Dancing on Ice ===
On 23 September 2020, van Outen was announced as one of the celebrities competing on the thirteenth series of Dancing on Ice. She was partnered with Matt Evers. On 16 January 2021, van Outen suffered a partially dislocated shoulder and tendon damage to her left shoulder after falling during rehearsals for the launch show of series 13 of Dancing On Ice; van Outen was able to perform a modified dance routine with her professional skate partner Matt Evers on the launch show. On 26 January 2021, van Outen withdrew from the competition as a result of her dislocation, as well as three bone fractures which were confirmed after further MRI scans.

=== Other work ===
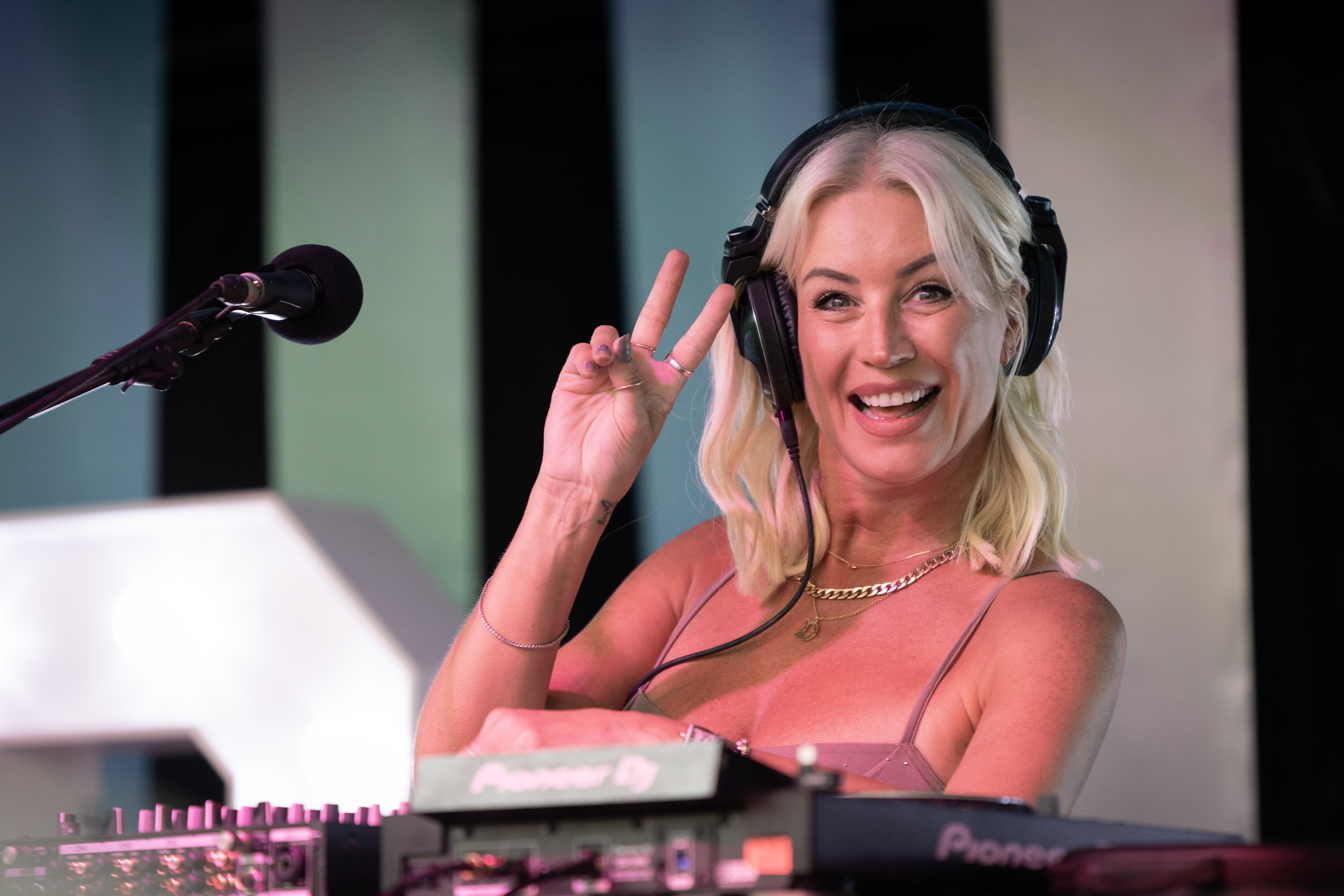
Van Outen's DJ set at the Old Leigh Regatta, in 2024

Van Outen has designed two collections thus far for the website Very, part of the Shop Direct Group. The first collection was a maternity range launched in March 2010 and the second an autumn/winter collection.

In 2021, she returned to music and released a cover of the Les Misérables musical song "On My Own" as a charity single in aid of the Make A Difference Trust. In February 2021, she launched her first podcast alongside partner Eddie Boxshall. Before We Say I Do follows the couple as they investigate types of relationship counselling in an attempt to iron out any differences they may have before they get married. It is produced by Yahoo! UK. In September 2023, Van Outen released the duet "That's What Friends Are For" with Duncan James. The single, in aid of Macmillan Cancer Support, was recorded in tribute to their friend, singer Sarah Harding, who died from breast cancer in 2021. In October 2025, she released an album "A Bit of Me"

== Personal life ==
From 1998 to 2001, she dated Jamiroquai lead singer Jay Kay. The couple were engaged. The Jamiroquai song "Little L" is said to have been inspired by their break-up.

From 2009 to 2015 (separated 2013), she was married to Any Dream Will Do winner Lee Mead. They have a daughter, who was born in 2010. From July 2014 until January 2022, she was in a relationship with commodities trader Eddie Boxshall; they lived together in Chelmsford.

In 2012, during an episode of Strictly Come Dancing, van Outen injured her neck after being dropped on her head during training. Surgeons had to remove her larynx in order to access her spine, which resulted in a scar on her throat.

Van Outen has worked with charity. She supports Breast Cancer Care and Great Ormond Street Hospital. In 2009, Van Outen climbed Mount Kilimanjaro for Comic Relief, and in 2013 took part in a trek across the Great Wall of China for the Royal Marsden Hospital.

== Filmography ==
=== Film ===
Year	Title	Role	Notes
1999	Tube Tales	Alex	In segment "Horny"
2000	Love, Honour and Obey	Maureen	
2006	The Battersea Ripper		
2006	Are You Ready for Love?	Rita	
2008	One Careful Owner	Lynn	Short film
2012	Keith Lemon: The Film	Herself	Cameo
2012	Run for Your Wife	Michelle Smith	
2017	Gloves Off	Vera	
2017	Amy and Sophia	Diane Collins	
2023	Sumotherhood	Nurse	

=== Television ===
Year	Title	Role	Notes
1989	Crossbow	Goldilocks	AKA as William Tell. Episode: "Goldilocks"
1990	Kappatoo	Tracey Cotton	7 episodes
1993	The Bill	Mandy Curtis	Series 9; Episode: "A Willing Victim"
1994	The Bill	Receptionist	Series 10; Episode: "Threats and Promises"
1995–1996	Massive!	Herself - Presenter	
1996	Zig and Zag's Dirty Deeds	Herself	Episode: "Gingerella"
1996–2001	The Big Breakfast	Herself - Presenter	34 episodes
1997	Snap!	Herself - Presenter	8 episodes
1998	Jack and the Beanstalk	Jill	Television film
1998	The Young Person's Guide to Becoming a Rock Star	Lizzie	Episode:"Signing on the Line"
1998	The Bill	Melanie Lehmann	Series 14; Episode: "The Personal Touch"
1998–1999	Babes in the Wood	Leigh Jackson	14 episodes
1998–2000	The Record of the Year	Herself - Presenter	
1999–2000	Something for the Weekend	Herself - Presenter	15 episodes
2000	How Much Do You Love Me?		
2000	Operation Good Guys	Herself	Episode: "That's Entertainment"
2000–2001	Prickly Heat	Herself - Co-host	
2001	Murder in Mind	Debra Squires	Episode: "Neighbours"
2003	The 100 Greatest Musicals	Herself - Presenter	Television film
2003–2004	Bo' Selecta!	Herself	3 episodes
2004	Johnny & Denise: Passport to Paradise	Herself - Presenter	6 episodes
2004	French and Saunders	Lear's Middle Daughter	Episode #6.4
2005	This Morning	Herself - Guest presenter	
2005–2006	Where the Heart Is	Kim Blakeney	13 episodes
2006	The National Lottery: Christmas Special	Herself - Presenter	
2007	Any Dream Will Do!	Herself - Judge	11 episodes
2007	Grease: You're the One that I Want!	Herself - Host	11 episodes
2007	The Friday Night Project	Herself - Guest presenter	
2008	Fairy Tales	Michaela	Mini-series; Episode: "The Empress's New Clothes"
2008	Backstage at the Brits	Herself - Presenter	
2008	Who Dares, Sings!	Herself - Co-presenter	7 episodes
2008	Hairspray: The School Musical	Herself - Presenter	
2008	I'd Do Anything	Herself - Judge	13 episodes
2009	Hotel Babylon	Mary	Episode #4.5
2010	The 5 O'Clock Show	Herself - Guest presenter	5 episodes
2010	Lorraine	Herself - Guest presenter	Episode dated 22 October 2010
2010–present	The Only Way Is Essex	Herself - Voiceover	204 episodes
2011	Born to Shine	Herself - Judge	6 episodes
2012	Making the Magic: Disneyland Paris - 20th Anniversary	Herself - Narrator	Television film
2012	Strictly Come Dancing	Herself - Contestant	Series 10; 26 episodes
2013	Show Me the Telly	Herself	6 episodes
2013	Sunday Brunch	Herself - Guest presenter	2 episodes
2014	Draw It!	Herself	5 episodes
2014, 2017–2018	Loose Women	Herself - Panellist	Guest panellist (2014), Regular panellist (2017–2018)
2015	EastEnders	Karin Smart	4 episodes
2016–present	Matalan Presents: The Show	Herself - Presenter	
2018–2019	Ireland's Got Talent	Herself - Judge	7 episodes
2019–present	Celebrity Gogglebox	Herself	19 episodes
2019–2020	Neighbours	Prudence Wallace	19 episodes
2020	Fireman Sam: Norman Price and the Mystery in the Sky	Professor Polonium	Television film
2020	Richard Osman's House of Games	Herself - Contestant	Series 4; Week 6
2020	James Martin's Christmas Day	Herself - Guest	
2020	The Great British Sewing Bee	Herself - Contestant	Celebrity Christmas Special
2020–2021	Sunday Brunch	Herself - Guest	2 episodes
2020, 2023	The Masked Singer	Fox (Contestant)	Series 1; 6 episodes and 2023 Final
2021	Dancing on Ice	Herself - Contestant	3 episodes
2021	The Celebrity Circle	Herself - Contestant	3 episodes
2021	Paul Sinha's TV Showdown	Herself - Guest	Episode #1.1
2021	Cooking with the Stars	Herself - Contestant	6 episodes
2021–2023	Steph's Packed Lunch	Herself - Guest / Presenter	21 episodes
2022	Secrets of the Middle Aisle	Herself - Presenter	Mini-series
2022	The Big Narstie Show	Herself	Episode #5.3
2023	Air Fryers: Are They Worth It?	Herself - Presenter	Television Special
2023	Secrets of Supermarket Own-Brands	Herself - Presenter	Television Special
2024	Secrets of the Supermarket Buyers	Herself - Presenter	
2024	How to Heat Your Home for Less This Winter	Herself - Presenter	Channel 4 series
2025	Alcohol-free Booze: Is It Worth It?	Herself - Presenter	One-off documentary
2026	How to Sleep Better	Herself - Presenter	One-off documentary
2026	The Great Celebrity Pottery Throw Down	Herself - Contestant	Five-part series

== Stage credits ==
Year	Title	Role	Venue
1988–1989	Peter Pan	Wendy	Civic Theatre, Barnsley
1995–1996	Sleeping Beauty	Sleeping Beauty	Poole Arts Centre
1996–1997	Dick Whittington	Alice Fitzwarren	Horsham Arts Centre
2001, 2002	Chicago	Roxie Hart	Adelphi Theatre
2002	Chicago	Roxie Hart	Ambassador Theatre
2003	Tell Me on a Sunday	The Girl	Gielgud Theatre
2007	Rent Remixed	Maureen	Duke of York's Theatre
2009	Blondes	Various	Edinburgh Fringe Festival
2010–2011	Legally Blonde	Paulette	Savoy Theatre
2014	Some Girl I Used to Know	Stephanie	UK Tour (Various locations)
2018	Chicago	Velma Kelly	Phoenix Theatre

== Discography ==
=== Albums ===
List of albums, with selected chart positions, sales, and certifications
Title	Album details	Peak chart positions
Title	Album details	UK
Tell Me on a Sunday	Released: April 2003; Labels: Really Useful Records; Formats: CD, digital download	34
A Bit of Me	Released: October 2025; Labels: Menace Records; Formats: Digital Download	-

=== Singles ===
Year	Single	Peak chart positions	Album
Year	Single	UK	Album
1998	"Especially for You" (as Denise and Johnny)	3	non album single
2002	"Can't Take My Eyes Off You" (with Andy Williams)	23	The Essential Andy Williams
2014	"Some Girl I Used to Know"	–	non album single
2021	"On My Own"	–	non album single
2022	"From New York to L.A."	–	non album single
2023	"That's What Friends Are For" (with Duncan James)	(Note: "That's What Friends Are For" did not enter the UK Singles Top 100 but debuted and peaked at number 53 on the UK Singles Downloads Chart Top 100 on 8 September 2023.)	A Bit of Me
2024	"Discolicious"	–	non album single
2025	"The Glory of Love"	–	A Bit of Me
2025	"A Bit of Me"	–	A Bit of Me
2025	"All Wrapped Up"	–	non album single
2026	"In the Evening"	–	non album single
2026	"Just Another Day"	–	non album single

== Bibliography ==
- A Bit of Me: From Basildon to Broadway, and Back (Ebury Spotlight Books, 2022) ISBN 9781529109979

== See also ==
- List of Strictly Come Dancing contestants
