= Safebreakers =

- Genre: Technological game show
- Presented by: Ben Shephard
- Country of origin: United Kingdom
- Original language: English
- No. of series: 1
- No. of episodes: 8

Production
- Running time: 60 minutes (inc. adverts)
- Production company: Maverick Television

Original release
- Network: Sky1
- Release: 15 August – 3 October 2011

Related
- Scrapheap Challenge

Safebreakers is a technological game show presented by Ben Shephard. It was broadcast on Sky1 from 15 August to 3 October 2011.

== Format ==
In a similar vein to Scrapheap Challenge, over two days, and with a limited budget and materials, two teams attempt to build a vehicle which will help them travel to a safe in a seemingly inaccessible location. On the third day, the teams race their vehicles towards the safe. The teams pick up the safe's combination, with the first team to arrive entering the combination, and taking home the contents of the safe – £5,000 in cash.
