= Ben Shephard =

English television personality (born 1974)

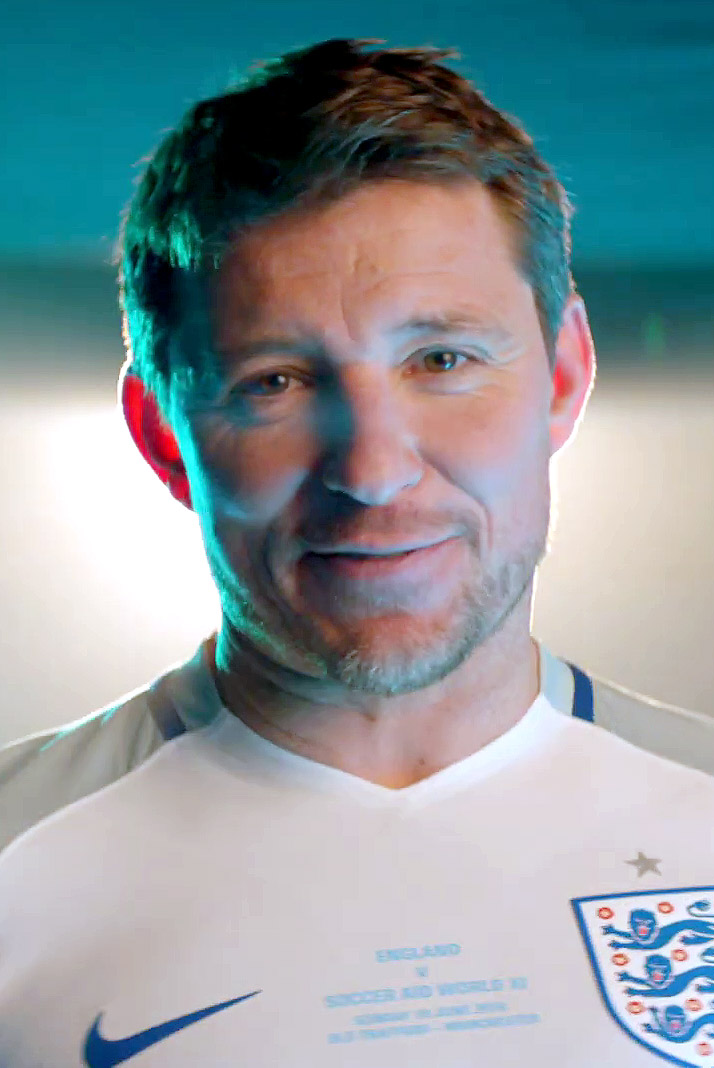
- Shephard in 2018
- Born: 11 December 1974 (age 51)
- Education: University of Birmingham
- Occupations: Television presenter; journalist
- Years active: 1998–present
- Employer: ITV
- Television: GMTV; The Xtra Factor; The Krypton Factor; Goals on Sunday; Tipping Point; Good Morning Britain; Ninja Warrior UK; This Morning
- Spouse: Annie Perks (m. 2004)
- Children: 2
- Website: officialbenshephard.com

Ben Shephard (born 11 December 1974) is an English television presenter and journalist. Since 2024, he has co-presented ITV's This Morning alongside Cat Deeley.

Shephard was a main presenter on the now defunct breakfast programme GMTV and co-hosted the ITV breakfast show Good Morning Britain alongside Susanna Reid and Kate Garraway from 2014 until 2024. He has also hosted shows such as The Krypton Factor (2009–2010), Tipping Point (2012–present) and Ninja Warrior UK (2015–2019, 2022).

In 2012, along with Helen Skelton, Shephard welcomed the athletes of the London 2012 Olympic and Paralympic Games to Trafalgar Square as part of their homecoming parade.

== Early life and education ==
Shephard attended the University of Birmingham, where he achieved a BA honours degree in Dance, Drama and Theatre Arts. Initially wanting to become an actor, while at university he joined a local weather network through a casting process and then became a runner (the most junior member of a television crew), before being encouraged by a producer to become a television presenter.

== Career ==
=== Channel 4 ===
Shephard's career took off in 1998, when he began hosting Channel 4 spin-off show The Bigger Breakfast, alongside fellow presenters including Josie D'Arby, Melanie Sykes and Dermot O'Leary. That same year, Shephard became the first presenter of T4's teen strand on Channel 4, which launched on 25 October 1998. He also presented Control Freaks for the channel in 1998.

Shephard returned to Channel 4 in 2013 to co-present cookery programme called What's Cooking?. He hosted one series, alongside Lisa Faulkner, and then permanently left Channel 4 on 24 May 2013.

=== ITV ===
Between 2004 and 2006, Shephard presented the first three series of ITV2 spin-off programme The Xtra Factor, whilst Kate Thornton hosted the main show on ITV. While hosting the show, Shephard also starred in The Xtra Factor – Battle of the Stars. He left the show after three series after missing out on the main presenting role (which went to Dermot O'Leary after the departure of original host Kate Thornton); he was replaced by Fearne Cotton.

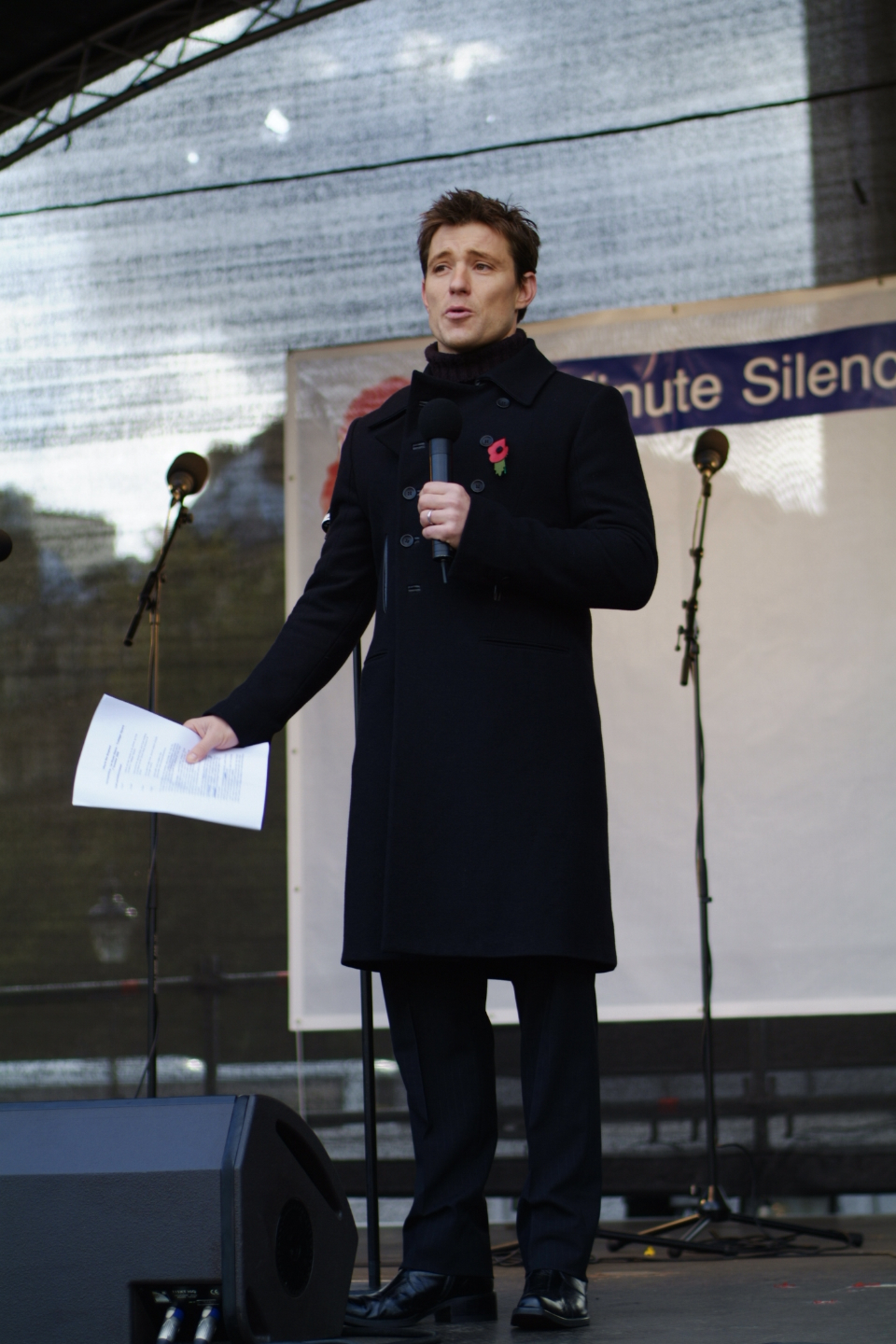
Ben Shephard in 2006

Between 2005 and 2011, Shephard was a stand-in presenter on This Morning, covering for regular presenter Phillip Schofield. In 2014, Ben was a stand-in presenter on This Morning Summer, co-hosting one episode alongside Ruth Langsford. Since 2015, he has been a regular stand-in presenter for Schofield and Eamonn Holmes.. In 2024, it was announced that Shephard would become a new permanent presenter, alongside Cat Deeley, presenting Monday to Thursday replacing Schofield who left the show the previous year.

In 2006, Shephard co-presented reality singing contest Soapstar Superstar alongside Fern Britton. The programme returned the following year in 2007, without Shephard as the host. In 2007, Shephard co-hosted Dancing on Ice Exclusive, a spin-off series which aired on ITV.

In 2008, Shephard co-presented Who Dares, Sings! with Denise van Outen.

Shephard hosted music specials on the channel, including Rod Stewart: One Night Only, which aired on 5 December 2009 and Phil Collins: One Night Only, which aired the following year on 18 September 2010.

In 2009, ITV revived the classic game show The Krypton Factor, with Shephard chosen to present the new series. Following the success of the first series in 2009, he was asked to present a second series the following year. In 2010, Shephard co-presented Dancing on Ice Friday alongside Coleen Nolan. The show was a spin-off from the main Dancing on Ice show.

Since 2012, Shephard has presented the daytime game show Tipping Point, as well as celebrity episodes Tipping Point: Lucky Stars.

Shephard co-presented two episodes of the factual series Mystery Map with Julia Bradbury, which aired on 20 November 2013 and 27 November 2013.

Since 2015, Ben has co-presented the Saturday night game show Ninja Warrior UK for ITV, alongside Rochelle Humes and Chris Kamara.

In 2026, Shephard appeared as a contestant on the seventh series of The Masked Singer as "Conkers". He reached the final and finished as the runner-up. Shephard also appeared as a guest panellist in the fourth episode, when he was not performing.

==== ITV Breakfast ====
Shephard joined the breakfast programme GMTV in 2000 and presented Entertainment Today alongside Jenni Falconer. He also became the main relief presenter for GMTV Today. After the departure of Eamonn Holmes in April 2005, Shephard became Fiona Phillips' co-host on GMTV Today, presenting on Mondays, Tuesdays and alternate Wednesdays. He continued to present Entertainment Today, but began to share duties with Michael Underwood. When GMTV relaunched in January 2009, his main co-host became Kate Garraway, presenting on Monday, Tuesday and alternate Wednesdays.

On 30 June 2010 Shephard announced his departure from GMTV, two months before the end of the programme, stating that he wished to spend more time with his family and focus on his charity work. Ben presented his final episode of GMTV on 30 July 2010, before the programme was axed two months later in September. The show was later replaced by Daybreak hosted Adrian Chiles and Christine Bleakley and then later by Lorraine Kelly, Kate Garraway and Aled Jones.

After four years on air Daybreak ended in spring 2014 to make way for a new ITV Breakfast programme Good Morning Britain. It was announced on 3 March 2014, that Shephard would be a presenter on the newly launched programme. Shephard's first show was on 28 April 2014 and he hosted the show on Thursdays and Fridays alongside Susanna Reid (Thursday) and Kate Garraway (Friday).

In 2024 it was announced that Shephard would leave Good Morning Britain to join sister show This Morning as the permanent replacement for Phillip Schofield and Holly Willoughby, alongside Cat Deeley.

On 23 February 2024, Shephard presented his final Good Morning Britain show.

=== Sky ===
On 27 July 2010 Shephard announced that he had signed a new contract with Sky Sports, where he presented Goals on Sunday alongside Chris Kamara in a deal reportedly worth £495,000 a year. He also hosted live secondary match coverage of the UEFA Champions League on Sky Sports 3 or 4, while the main coverage on Sky Sports 1 is hosted by Jeff Stelling. He was the main anchor for Sky Sports coverage of the League Cup. As of April 2014, Shephard only presented Goals on Sunday for Sky Sports and no longer hosted any of the live matches.

In 2011 Shephard fronted an eight-part game show for Sky One called Safebreakers.

As of 28 June 2019 Shephard quit Goals on Sunday in order to spend time with his family.

=== BBC ===
In the earlier 2000s Shephard was a regular presenter of BBC Choice's EastEnders Revealed programme. In 2007, Shephard presented the BBC entertainment series DanceX with Strictly Come Dancing judges Arlene Phillips and Bruno Tonioli on the panel.

Between 2008 and 2009 Shephard presented the National Lottery game show 1 vs. 100, taking over from Dermot O'Leary.

In June 2012 Shephard made a guest appearance on the sports-based panel show A Question Of Sport. The following month he announced that he had permanently left the BBC in order to concentrate on his work with Sky Sports and ITV.

=== Radio ===
In 2006 Shephard was a presenter on Magic Radio station. He presented a Saturday breakfast programme. He returned to radio in 2008, where he presented a Monday evening show on Heat Radio.

=== Other work ===
Shephard appeared in the 2004 TV film A Bear's Christmas Tail as a carol singer. He also appeared in Harry Potter and the Half-Blood Prince in 2009. He played the role of Diagon Alley Father, but was uncredited. In 2009, Shephard starred in an episode of Bookaboo on CITV. In 2012, he was a studio host for the London 2012 Olympic Games, and Paralympic Games, which was only made available to view in the Olympic park. At this time, he also acted as a stadium commentator, where he introduced all of the action in the main arena, and he also interviewed celebrity guests.

In 2013 Shephard was the face of Warburtons lunch thins. He has been on the judging panel for Pride of Britain Awards numerous times.

Shephard holds a Guinness World Record. In 2010, he set the record for smashing the most pumpkins in one minute. In 2008, he held the record for the highest reverse bungee jump which was beaten in 2010 by David Hasselhoff; and he held the record for tossing the most pancakes in one minute in 2009, but was beaten the following day by Aldo Zilli.

== Personal life ==
Shephard married Annie Perks on 25 March 2004 in Salcombe, Devon, and went to Burgh Island afterwards. The couple lived in Islington before moving to Richmond, London, in 2005 and have two sons. They met when they were both students at the University of Birmingham, where Perks studied Philosophy and was Head of the Philosophy & Epistemology society.

Shephard has also played both rugby and football. He has attention deficit hyperactivity disorder.

=== Charity ===
Shephard supports several charities including the Cystic Fibrosis Trust, Haven House Children's Hospice and the Holly Lodge Centre. To help raise funds for these charities, Shephard takes part in various physical challenges. Since the year 2000, he has completed 14 marathons.

In 2006, 2008, 2010, 2012, 2014, 2016, and 2019, Shephard played for England in Soccer Aid which aired live on ITV. The Soccer Aid events raise money for the Unicef charity. In 2016, he was red carded for a "cynical foul" on Dimitar Berbatov. Shephard did not take part in 2018's Soccer Aid due to an injury. Instead, he was appointed as England Coach for that year's Soccer Aid.

One of Shephard's charity challenges was boxing against Lemar for the Sport Relief appeal. After training with Ricky Hatton and Andy Mayo at Mayo's Gym, he won by decision after three rounds.

Another of Shephard's charity challenges took place in early 2009 when he, along with eight other well-known celebrities, climbed Mount Kilimanjaro to raise money for Comic Relief. Joining him on the climb were Cheryl Cole, Kimberley Walsh, Fearne Cotton, Gary Barlow, Alesha Dixon, Ronan Keating, Denise van Outen and Chris Moyles. The team raised £3,326,000 in total.

In 2010 Shephard and his friend Ivan ran the Coast-to-Coast Challenge, raising over £120,000 for the Children's Heart Unit Fund at the Freeman Hospital in Newcastle upon Tyne. The run was 145 miles long and took them five days.

In March 2011 Shephard designed blue and black striped hipsters for charity to help raise awareness of Prostate Cancer.

In January 2014 Shephard helped to raise money for the charity Seb4Chuf.

In September 2017 he played as part of Les Ferdinand's team for Game 4 Grenfell.

== Filmography ==
=== Television ===
Year	Title	Role	Notes
1998	Control Freaks	Presenter	
1998	The Bigger Breakfast	Presenter	
1998	T4	Presenter	Teen strand
2000	Eastenders Revealed	Presenter	
2000	Maths 4 Real	Presenter	1 series
2000	MTV Select	Co-presenter	
2000–2008	Entertainment Today	Co-presenter	Also presented GMTV
2000–2010	GMTV	Presenter	Relief presenter (2000–2005), Main presenter (2005–2010)
2002	Friends	Man with microphone	Guest appearance, 1 episode
2004–2006	The Xtra Factor	Presenter	3 series
2005, 2009–2011, 2014–2018, 2023	This Morning	Guest Presenter	
2006	Soapstar Superstar	Presenter	1 series
2006	All-Star Cup	Reporter	
2007	Dancing on Ice Exclusive	Presenter	Dancing on Ice spin-off
2007	Gameshow Marathon	Contestant	
2007	DanceX	Presenter	1 series
2008–2009	1 vs. 100	Presenter	2 series
2008–2009	Who Dares, Sings!	Co-presenter	1 series
2009	Scream! If You Know the Answer	Contestant	1 episode
2009	Rod Stewart: One Night Only	Presenter	One-off episode
2009–2010	The Krypton Factor	Presenter	2 series
2009–2010	Ads of the Decade	Narrator	3 episodes
2010	Dancing on Ice Friday	Co-presenter	Dancing on Ice weekly spin-off
2010	Phil Collins: One Night Only	Presenter	One-off episode
2010–2014	UEFA Champions League	Presenter	
2010–2019	Goals on Sunday	Co-presenter	
2011	Safebreakers	Presenter	1 series
2012–present	Tipping Point	Presenter	12 series (regular), 8 series (celebrity)
2013	What's Cooking?	Co-presenter	1 series
2013	Mystery Map	Co-presenter	2 episodes
2014–2024	Good Morning Britain	Co-presenter	Thursdays & Fridays
2015–2019, 2022	Ninja Warrior UK	Co-presenter	6 series
2024–present	This Morning	Co–presenter	Monday–Thursday
2026	The Summit	Presenter	Reality television series
2026	The Masked Singer	"Conkers"	Series 7 runner-up

=== Film ===
Year	Title	Role	Notes
2004	A Bear's Christmas Tail	Carol Singer No. 1	TV film
2009	Harry Potter and the Half-Blood Prince	Diagon Alley Father	Uncredited
2017	The Lego Ninjago Movie	Himself, voice	Cameo role
2021	SAS: Red Notice	Newsreader	Cameo role

=== Radio ===
Year	Title	Role	Notes
2006	Magic 105.4	Presenter	Saturday breakfast slot
2008	Heat Radio	Presenter	Monday evening slot

=== Book ===
- Humble Heroes: Inspirational stories of hope, heart and humanity (Blink Publishing, 2022) ISBN 978-1788707657
