= Christine Lampard =

Northern Irish broadcaster (born 1979)

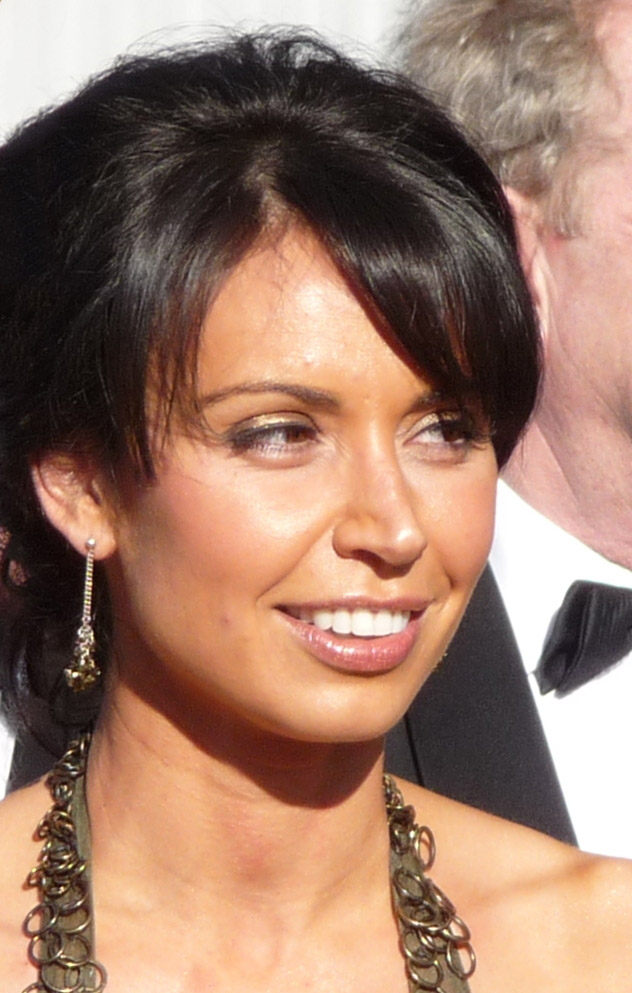
- Lampard in 2009
- Born: Christine Louise Bleakley; 2 February 1979 (age 47); Newry, Northern Ireland
- Occupations: Television and radio presenter
- Years active: 1997–present
- Employer(s): BBC (2001–2010, 2017); ITV (2010–present); Radio Aire 2 (2015); UKTV (2016–present)
- Television: The One Show (2007–2010); Daybreak (2010–2011); Text Santa (2011–2015); Dancing on Ice (2012–2014); This Morning (2013–2016, 2023); Wild Ireland (2015); Loose Women (2016–present); Lorraine (2017–2025)
- Spouse: Frank Lampard (m. 2015)
- Children: 2
- Relatives: Frank Lampard Sr. (father-in-law)

Christine Louise Lampard (née Bleakley, born 2 February 1979) is a Northern Irish television and radio presenter. She has presented various television programmes with Adrian Chiles, such as The One Show (2007–2010) and Daybreak (2010–2011), while with Phillip Schofield she has presented Dancing on Ice (2012–2014) and This Morning (2013–2016, 2023, 2025). Lampard has also presented factual series for ITV including Off the Beaten Track (2013) and Wild Ireland (2015). Since 2016 she has been a presenter of the ITV lunchtime chat show Loose Women.

== Early life ==
Christine Louise Bleakley was born on 2 February 1979 at Daisy Hill Hospital, Newry, and grew up in Newtownards. She has a younger sister, Nicola. She started her television career as a runner and then trained to become a floor manager while studying for her A-Levels at Bloomfield Collegiate School in Ballyhackamore, Belfast. She continued to work at BBC NI while studying for a politics degree at Queen's University, Belfast. However, she did not complete her degree course, and instead moved into television work full-time.

== Career ==
=== BBC ===
She worked on the long-running BBC Northern Ireland comedy Give My Head Peace. She returned to make a cameo appearance in the show in its 2016 special.

She moved into television with BBC Northern Ireland hosting a wide variety of shows. One of her programmes was called Sky High which saw her flying around Northern Ireland in a helicopter in 2001. A weekly entertainment show called First Stop followed, and she also hosted Would You Pass The 11+ and coverage of Children in Need. She presented the BBC Northern Ireland cookery show, Spill the Beans in 2005.

Outside Northern Ireland, Lampard co-hosted BBC Two's Let Me Entertain You with Brian Conley. On 16 August 2007, she received a last-minute phone call at Belfast City Airport and made an unannounced, last-minute debut as co-host of The One Show on BBC One that evening to cover for Myleene Klass, who had gone into sudden labour the previous evening after presenting the programme and gave birth three weeks early. Lampard, who had been drafted in that day to cover Klass's maternity leave, became the permanent co-host when it was later confirmed Klass would not be returning. She and Adrian Chiles hosted the show for three years. In January 2010, Northern Irish comedian Patrick Kielty was a guest on The One Show, when he revealed her mobile phone number to the camera. After being bombarded with calls and text messages, she changed her telephone number.

In October 2009, Lampard co-presented Britain's Classroom Heroes alongside Jeremy Vine on BBC Two. In 2009, she occasionally presented The National Lottery Draws on BBC One. In March 2010, she co-hosted a segment of the Sport Relief telethon with Gary Lineker.

When Adrian Chiles left the BBC in 2010, there was a great deal of speculation on whether she would extend her BBC contract or move to ITV. Following the speculation, Lampard also left The One Show to join ITV as the co-host of Daybreak following Adrian Chiles' departure from the BBC to ITV. Questions were raised in Parliament over the size and scale of the proposed £900,000 per year two-year BBC contract. Shortly after she fired her long-term manager and signed with Chiles' management company, on 20 June 2010, the BBC announced that it had withdrawn an offer to extend her current contract. Later that day ITV plc (owners of GMTV) announced she would again partner Chiles by co-hosting the revamped breakfast show with him, and also hosting other entertainment programmes. Lampard's final live studio appearance on the programme aired on 10 June 2010, just before the show took a planned summer break. On 8 July 2010, the BBC confirmed that she was not returning to The One Show after the programme returned from the World Cup break on 12 July.

In September 2016, it was announced that Lampard would return to the BBC to co-present Christine and Adrian's Friendship Test. She co-presented the three-part series with Adrian Chiles on BBC Northern Ireland in November 2017.

=== ITV ===
She moved to ITV less than three hours after the BBC had withdrawn their £1 million offer for her to remain on the channel. She joined ITV on a four-year contract worth £4 million.

On 6 September 2010, she joined Adrian Chiles to host ITV Breakfast's Daybreak. The programme suffered mixed reviews and poor viewing figures in its first weeks on air, and Lampard herself was the subject of criticism. On 18 November 2011, she and co-presenter Adrian Chiles were replaced by Dan Lobb and Kate Garraway who presented on an interim basis. In September 2012, they were replaced by Aled Jones and Lorraine Kelly.

In February 2011, Lampard presented a game show pilot for ITV called Control, but it was not commissioned for a series. From 2011 until 2015, she co-hosted ITV's Christmas telethon Text Santa. In 2011, 2014 and 2015, she co-hosted the charity appeal with Phillip Schofield and with Paddy McGuinness in 2012 and 2013. She has hosted a number of ITV Specials, including Simply Red: For the Last Time in 2010, Duran Duran: One Night Only in 2011 and Michael Flatley: A Night to Remember in 2014. On Boxing Day 2012, she presented That Dog Can Dance.

In 2011, she became Phillip Schofield's co-presenter on Dancing on Ice, replacing Holly Willoughby. She presented three series of the show between 2012 and 2014 when it came to an end after the ninth series on 9 March 2014. For each episode of Dancing on Ice, Lampard was paid £24,163. When she was hosting the show, she was the highest paid female television star, earning around £400 per minute. Dancing on Ice returned in January 2018. Holly Willoughby returned to present with Phillip Schofield, meaning Lampard no longer appears.

On 11 May 2011, she presented The National Movie Awards. In 2013, Lampard presented a six-part series called Off the Beaten Track. On 3 March 2014, it was announced the show had been axed.

She is a frequent stand-in host on This Morning, subbing whenever Phillip Schofield or Holly Willoughby are unable to appear.

On 23 December 2014, Lampard co-hosted one-off documentary Roman Britain From the Air with Michael Scott. On 27 December 2014, she hosted the one-off magic special Darcy Oake: Edge of Reality and acted as Darcy Oake's assistant in two illusions, first being made to appear on a large motorcycle and then being sawed in half in Oake's Clearly Impossible sawing illusion.

In 2015, Lampard presented the six-part documentary series Wild Ireland which saw her travel across the Wild Atlantic Way in Ireland. In October 2016, she was a guest panellist on an episode of Loose Women. She guest anchored numerous episodes of the show before becoming a permanent anchor.

Since February 2017, Lampard has guest presented numerous episodes of the ITV Breakfast show, Lorraine., and is the regular stand-in for Lorraine Kelly during school breaks.

=== UKTV ===
In October 2016, Lampard co-presented Celebrity Haunted Hotel Live for UKTV's W channel. The show, which she co-hosted alongside Matt Richardson and Jamie East, aired for five consecutive nights from 27–31 October.

In 2018, Lampard and Richardson presented Celebrity Haunted Mansion for the W channel. It aired for five consecutive nights from 21–25 February.

=== Strictly Come Dancing ===
In 2008, Lampard took part in the sixth series of Strictly Come Dancing, in which she was partnered with professional dancer Matthew Cutler.

Lampard and Cutler were eliminated on 30 November 2008, leaving the competition in fifth place, after Rachel Stevens and Vincent Simone beat them in the dance-off.

Week	Dance/Song	Judges' scores					Result
Week	Dance/Song	Craig Revel Horwood	Len Goodman	Arlene Phillips	Bruno Tonioli	Total	Result
2	Foxtrot / "The Way You Look Tonight"	6	6	8	7	27	Safe
4	Quickstep / "She's So Lovely"	6	6	7	7	26	Safe
5	Samba / "Baila, Baila Conmigo"	7	7	8	8	30	Safe
6	Paso Doble / "Fighter"	3	6	7	6	22	Safe
7	American Smooth / "Singin' in the Rain"	7	7	8	7	29	Safe
8	Jive / "Jailhouse Rock"	7	8	8	8	31	Safe
9	Waltz / "See the Day"	8	8	9	9	34	Safe
10	Cha Cha Cha / "I Like It Like That"	6	6	8	7	27	Safe
11	Tango / "Addicted to Love"	6	7	8	7	28	N/A
11	Salsa / "Cosmic Girl"	7	7	8	8	30	Eliminated

=== Radio ===
At the beginning of her career, Lampard worked at Belfast Citybeat as a newsreader and presenter, working with Stephen Nolan.

From January to March 2015, Lampard presented a Sunday afternoon programme called Sunday Lunch from 3–4pm on Magic Radio.

=== Film ===
Lampard was the voice of a radio newsreader in the 1998 Northern Irish film Divorcing Jack, and the voice of Sandra in the 2010 film A Turtle's Tale: Sammy's Adventures.

=== Other work ===
She set up Chrisola Entertainment Limited in 2009 and is the company's director. In 2010 and 2011, Lampard was on the judging panel for the Pride of Britain Awards. She released a 60-minute fitness DVD called Christine Bleakley – The Workout in December 2011.

On 20 March 2010, Lampard made her stand-up comedy debut when she took part in Channel 4's Comedy Gala, a benefit show in aid of Great Ormond Street Children's Hospital, filmed at the O2 Arena in London.

In August 2014, Lampard was announced as the new brand ambassador for Soft & Gentle anti-perspirant. She became an ambassador for BT Call Protect in January 2017.

=== Awards ===
In November 2010, Lampard was awarded the title 'Top TV Host' at the 2010 Cosmopolitan Ultimate Women of the Year Awards.

== Personal life ==
Lampard dated Belfast Giants ice hockey player Curtis Bowen as she started her TV career. After breaking up with him in 2003, she dated Dublin restaurant owner Christian Stokes to whom she got engaged in 2004. She was then in a relationship with entrepreneur Mark Beirne for three years until they split in January 2009.

In October 2009, she began a relationship with English footballer Frank Lampard, son of former footballer Frank Lampard Sr. On 15 June 2011, it was announced they had become engaged after Frank proposed on holiday in Los Angeles. During the early years of their relationship, they lived together at his mansion in Esher, Surrey, which they put on the market in 2012 and later retained as a rental property. The couple got married on 20 December 2015 at St Paul's Church, Knightsbridge. She is the stepmother to his two daughters with former fiancée Elen Rivas. They live in Kensington, London. On 21 September 2018, their first child, a daughter, was born. On 15 March 2021, it was announced that they had a son.

=== Charity ===
Lampard is a Northern Ireland ambassador for The Prince's Trust. In 2010, she did a water skiing challenge, raising £1,321,623 for Sport Relief, making her the first person to water-ski across the English Channel. In the same year, her co-host on The One Show, Adrian Chiles grew a beard, which was later shaved off by Lampard for Sport Relief, raising £60,000 in the process. In 2012, Lampard took part in a 5 km run for Cancer Research UK with Heidi Range and Roxanne Pallett.

Lampard is a patron for the Sparks children's charity. In 2015, she hosted the charity's winter ball alongside Jon Culshaw. She also supported the Text Santa appeal and presented their annual telethon from 2011 until 2015.

== Filmography ==
=== Television ===
Year	Title	Role	Notes	Channel
2003	First Stop	Co-presenter	1 episode; with Ralph McLean	BBC Northern Ireland
2004	Would You Pass the 11+	Co-presenter	1 episode; with Eamonn Holmes	BBC Northern Ireland
2005	Spill the Beans	Presenter	1 episode	BBC Northern Ireland
2006–2007	Let Me Entertain You	Co-presenter	2 series; with Brian Conley	BBC Two
2007	Looking for Love	Co-presenter	1 series; with May McFettridge	BBC Northern Ireland
2007–2010	The One Show	Co-presenter	With Adrian Chiles	BBC One
2008	Strictly Come Dancing	Participant	Series 6	BBC One
2008	NI Wags	Narrator	1 series	BBC Northern Ireland
2009	Britain's Classroom Heroes	Co-presenter	1 episode; with Jeremy Vine	BBC Two
2009	Sky High	Presenter	1 series	BBC Northern Ireland
2009	The National Lottery Draws	Presenter	Occasional episodes	BBC One
2010	Sport Relief	Co-presenter	1 episode; with Gary Lineker	BBC One
2010	Simply Red: For the Last Time	Presenter	One-off special	ITV
2010–2011	Daybreak	Co-presenter	With Adrian Chiles and Dan Lobb	ITV
2011	Duran Duran: One Night Only	Presenter	One-off special	ITV
2011	National Movie Awards	Presenter	1 episode	ITV
2011	Westlife: For the Last Time	Presenter	One-off special	ITV
2011–2015	Text Santa	Co-presenter	With Phillip Schofield and Paddy McGuinness	ITV
2012	This is Lionel Richie	Presenter	One-off special	ITV
2012	That Dog Can Dance	Presenter	One-off special	ITV
2012–2014	Dancing on Ice	Co-presenter	3 series; with Phillip Schofield	ITV
2013	Off the Beaten Track	Presenter	1 series	ITV
2013–2016, 2023, 2025– present	This Morning	Regular stand-in presenter	With Phillip Schofield (2013–2016) & Dermot O'Leary (2023, 2025–present)	ITV
2014	Michael Flatley: A Night to Remember	Presenter	One-off special	ITV
2014	Spandau Ballet: True Gold	Presenter	One-off special	ITV
2014	Roman Britain From the Air	Co-presenter	One-off special; with Michael Scott	ITV
2014	Darcy Oake: Edge of Reality	Presenter	One-off special	ITV
2015	Wild Ireland	Presenter	1 series	ITV
2016	Celebrity Haunted Hotel Live	Co-presenter	1 series; with Matt Richardson and Jamie East	W
2016–present	Loose Women	Anchor	Guest panellist (2016)	ITV
2016	Give My Head Peace	Herself	Guest; 'The Farce Awakens'	BBC Northern Ireland
2017	Christine and Adrian's Friendship Test	Co-presenter	1 series; with Adrian Chiles	BBC Northern Ireland
2017–2025	Lorraine	Deputy & School Holiday presenter	110 Episodes	ITV
2018	Celebrity Haunted Mansion	Co-presenter	1 series; with Matt Richardson	W

=== Film ===
Year	Title	Role	Notes
1998	Divorcing Jack	Newsreader	Voice only
2010	A Turtle's Tale: Sammy's Adventures	Sandra	Voice only

=== Radio ===
Year	Title	Role	Notes
1995–1997	Belfast Citybeat	Newsreader	With Stephen Nolan
2015	Sunday Lunch	Presenter	Sundays, 3–4pm

== See also ==
- List of Strictly Come Dancing contestants
