= Michael Scott (English author) =

British classicist and broadcaster (born 1981)

Professor Michael Scott
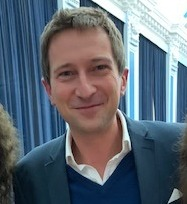
- Professor Michael Scott in 2019
- Born: 1981 (age 44–45)
- Education: King's College School
- Alma mater: Christ's College, Cambridge; Magdalene College, Cambridge; University of Cambridge; (B.A, MPhil, PhD)
- Occupations: Academic, author and broadcaster in classics and ancient history
- Employer: University of Warwick
- Website: michaelscottweb.com

Michael Scott SFHEA (born 1981) is a British classical scholar, ancient historian, and presenter. He is professor of classics and ancient history at the University of Warwick.

In 2015 he was a foundation fellow of the Warwick International Higher Education Academy; he was appointed a senior fellow of the Higher Education Academy in 2016. He was a National Teaching Fellow in 2017, and in 2017–2018 was a Leverhulme Research Fellow.

In 2020 he became the co-director of the Warwick Institute of Engagement.

He is president of the Lytham Saint Annes branch of the Classical Association.

He was awarded the Classical Association Prize in 2021, this is awarded to the individual who has done the most to raise the profile of Classics in the public eye.

He was named as the International Lego Classicist of the Year in 2022.

He was appointed as Pro-Vice-Chancellor (International) at the University of Warwick in 2023.

== Publications ==
- Themistocles: The Rise and Fall of Athens's Naval Mastermind (2026) Yale University Press. ISBN 978-0300256598
- X Marks the Spot: The Story of Archaeology in Eight Extraordinary Discoveries (2023) Hodder & Stoughton. ISBN 978-1529367768
- Life in Ancient Greece (2019) Ruby Tuesday Books. ISBN 978-1788560405
- M I Finley: An Ancient Historian and His Impact (2016) Cambridge University Press. Edited Volume (Co-editor with Prof Robin Osborne and Daniel Jew). ISBN 9781107149267.
- Ancient Worlds: An Epic History of East and West (2016) Hutchinson/Windmill. ISBN 978-0091958817.
- Delphi: Centre of the Ancient World (2014) Princeton University Press. ISBN 9781400851324.
- Space and Society in the Greek and Roman Worlds (Key Themes in Ancient History series) (2012) Cambridge University Press. ISBN 9781107401501.
- Risk in Our Time: Proceedings of the Darwin College Lecture Series 2010. (Co-editor with Dr Layla Skinns and Tony Cox) Cambridge University Press. ISBN 9780521171977.
- Delphi and Olympia: the Spatial Politics of Panhellenism in the Archaic and Classical Periods (2010) Cambridge University Press. ISBN 9781107671287.
- From Democrats to Kings: the Brutal Dawn of a New World from the Downfall of Athens to the Rise of Alexander the Great (2009) Icon Books. ISBN 978-1848311312.

== TV Programmes ==
- Ancient Invisible Cities: Cairo, Athens, Istanbul (2018)
- Sicily: Wonder of the Mediterranean (2017)
- This is Greece with Michael Scott (2016)
- Italy’s Invisible Cities: Naples, Florence, Venice (2016)
- Rome’s Invisible City (2015)
- The Quizeum (2015)
- Roman Britain From the Air (2014)
- Who Were the Greeks? (2013)
- The Mystery of the X Tombs (2013)
- Ancient Greece: The Greatest Show on Earth (2013)
- Jesus: Rise to Power (2013)
- Guilty Pleasures: Luxury in the Ancient and Medieval Worlds (2011)
- Delphi: bellybutton of the ancient world (2010)
