= Let Me Entertain You (2006 TV series) =

- Genre: Variety
- Created by: Adam Wood
- Presented by: Brian Conley; Christine Bleakley
- Country of origin: United Kingdom
- Original language: English
- No. of series: 2
- No. of episodes: 40

Production
- Production location: Teddington Studios
- Running time: 45 minutes (Series 1); 30 minutes (Series 2)
- Production company: Lion TV

Original release
- Network: BBC Two
- Release: 21 August 2006 – 22 June 2007

Let Me Entertain You is a daytime variety show presented by Brian Conley and Christine Bleakley that aired on BBC Two from 21 August 2006 to 22 June 2007.

== Format ==
The show invites all comers to entertain a studio audience doing anything they like for a cash prize. At any point during their act, a member of the audience can press a button they are given to register their 'displeasure' with the act; when half of the audience have pressed their buttons, the act is stopped. If they get over one minute of attention they get £100, over two minutes wins £200, and if they last three minutes they earn £1000. If the allcomer is under 16, they receive an alternative to cash prizes - usually a showbiz-related treat or an item useful to their career (e.g. a trip to the West End, a musical instrument). The most popular act from each day is entered into a weekly final.

== Champions ==
The series one champion was 13-year-old classical baritone, Matthew Crane, who sang "Nessun Dorma" in the Grand Final in 2006. Matthew was also asked back to sing on the Grand Final of series two, in 2007, as a guest performer.

The series two champion was Lee Lambert, who was also 13 years old at the time, and a singer. In the final he performed "I Am What I Am" in the disco style associated with Gloria Gaynor. Runners-up were David Ashley, a Frank Sinatra-style singer, and Faces of Disco, a comedy dance act who were subsequently semi-finalists in Britain's Got Talent 2009.

== Transmissions ==
Series	Start date	End date	Episodes
1	21 August 2006	15 September 2006	20
2	28 May 2007	22 June 2007	20
