= For the Last Time (TV series) =

- Genre: Music
- Presented by: Christine Bleakley
- Country of origin: United Kingdom
- Original language: English
- No. of episodes: 2

Production
- Running time: 60 minutes (inc. adverts)

Original release
- Network: ITV
- Release: 25 September 2010 – 17 December 2011

Related
- ITV Specials

For the Last Time is a British music show where long-running established bands perform one last time before saying goodbye to their most loved fans as they split up for good. Episodes were presented by Christine Bleakley. Since the show has aired, both bands have reunited: Simply Red in 2015, and Westlife in 2018.

== Episodes ==
#	Date Aired	Starring
1	25 September 2010	Simply Red
2	17 December 2011	Westlife
