= 2010 in British music =

This is a summary of 2010 in music in the United Kingdom.

== Events ==
- 1 January – Musicians honoured in the Queen's New Year Honours list include mezzo-soprano Sarah Connolly (CBE), conductor James Loughran (CBE), composer Craig Armstrong (OBE), rock musicians Francis Rossi and Rick Parfitt (OBE), composer Rachel Portman (OBE) and guitarist Jet Harris (MBE).
- 9 January – Jamie Cullum marries model Sophie Dahl.
- 15 February – Composer Stanley Vann celebrates his 100th birthday. In recognition of his past service as Master of the Music, Peterborough Cathedral issues a commemorative CD, Harken to the Whispering Angels, with a compilation of recordings by both the current choir and earlier recordings made during his tenure as organist.
- 29 March – Protesters interrupt a concert by the Jerusalem Quartet at London's Wigmore Hall.
- 3 April – New Llandaff Cathedral organ first played.
- 8 June – The Gregynog Music Festival opens; performers include Emma Kirkby, Catrin Finch and The Academy of Ancient Music.
- 11–13 June – The Download Festival 2010 takes place at Donington Park. AC/DC played on an exclusive stage next to the Maurice Jones main stage, which was headlined by Them Crooked Vultures, Rage Against the Machine and Aerosmith. The Ronnie James Dio stage was headlined by Bullet for My Valentine, Thirty Seconds to Mars and Stone Sour, the Pepsi Max stage by Job for a Cowboy, Michael Monroe and Suicidal Tendencies, the Red Bull Bedroom Jam Stage by Devil Sold His Soul, Breed 77 and Panic Cell, and the Jägermeister Acoustic stage by Skin, Reckless Love and Ginger Wildheart.
- 12 June – Musicians honoured in the Queen's Birthday Honours list include composer and conductor George Benjamin (CBE), composer Karl Jenkins (CBE), jazz musician Bill Ashton (OBE), singer-songwriter Graham Nash (OBE), and rock musician John Cale.
- 23–28 June – The Glastonbury Festival 2010 is headlined by Stevie Wonder. Other acts performing include Muse, Gorillaz, Thom Yorke and Jonny Greenwood, Keane and Scissor Sisters.
- 15 July – Robbie Williams announces that he will rejoin Take That.
- 16 July – The Proms 2010 season opens with a performance of Gustav Mahler's Symphony No. 8.
- 25 July
  - A special daytime Prom concert at the Royal Albert Hall includes Murray Gold's original music from the television series Doctor Who, and his arrangement of Ron Grainer's Doctor Who theme.
  - A memorial concert in honour of the recently deceased Sir Charles Mackerras takes place at the Royal Albert Hall, with the BBC Philharmonic Orchestra conducted by Vassily Sinaisky.
- 26 July – Simon Holt's "a table of noises" (2007), a concerto for percussion receives its London première at The Proms, having originally been performed in Birmingham.
- 13 August – The Three Choirs Festival Youth Choir give their first concert, at Tewkesbury Abbey, performing Handel's "Zadok the Priest", "Water Music (Suite No 2 in D)" and "My Heart is Inditing", and Bach's "Magnificat", accompanied by the Corelli Chamber Orchestra.
- 17 August – Huw Watkins' Violin Concerto is premièred at The Proms by Alina Ibragimova, for whom it was written.
- 11 September – The Last Night of the Proms opens with the première of Jonathan Dove's "A Song of Joys". Jiří Bělohlávek conducts the concert for the first time, and Renée Fleming is the soloist for "Rule, Britannia".
- 20 September – Orchestral Manoeuvres in the Dark release History of Modern, their first studio album in 14 years and the first to feature the band's "classic" four-piece lineup since 1986.
- 12 December – Matt Cardle wins the seventh series of The X Factor UK. Rebecca Ferguson is named runner-up, while One Direction and Cher Lloyd finish in third and fourth place respectively.

== Groups reformed ==
- Suede (live only)
- The Yummy Fur (touring only)
- The Libertines (Reading and Leeds Festival)
- Emerson, Lake & Palmer (High Voltage Festival)
- Take That (original line-up)
- Pulp
- Cast

== Groups disbanded ==
- See Musical groups disestablished in 2010

== Classical music ==
=== New works ===
- Patrick Hawes – Highgrove Suite
- Kenneth Hesketh – Danceries (set II)
- John Joubert – An English Requiem (op.166, 2010) commissioned for the Gloucester 2010 Three Choirs Festival
- Jon Lord – To Notice Such Things
- Mark-Anthony Turnage – Hammered Out
- Graham Waterhouse – Chinese Whispers

=== Opera ===
- David Blake – Scoring A Century

=== Albums ===
- Nicola Benedetti – Tchaikovsky: Violin Concerto op35; Bruch: Violin Concerto 1
- Tasmin Little – Elgar: Violin Concerto / Polonia / Interlude from the Crown of India
- Bryn Terfel – Carols & Christmas Songs
- Roderick Williams – Butterworth: Shropshire Lad (Songs From A Shropshire Lad/ Folk Songs From Sussex)

== Musical films ==
- Lemmy
- Sex & Drugs & Rock & Roll, starring Andy Serkis

== Film scores and incidental music ==
=== Film ===
- David Arnold – The Chronicles of Narnia: The Voyage of the Dawn Treader
- Ilan Eshkeri – Centurion

=== Television ===
- Jonathan Goldstein – Little Crackers

== British music awards ==
=== BRIT Awards ===
The 2010 BRIT Awards were hosted by Peter Kay on 16 February 2010.

- British Male Solo Artist: Dizzee Rascal
- British Female Solo Artist: Lily Allen
- British Breakthrough Act: JLS
- British Group: Kasabian
- MasterCard British Album: Lungs – Florence and the Machine
- British Single: "Beat Again" – JLS
- International Male Solo Artist: Jay-Z
- International Female Solo Artist: Lady Gaga
- International Breakthrough Act: Lady Gaga
- International Album: The Fame – Lady Gaga
- Critics' Choice: Ellie Goulding
- Brits Album of 30 Years: (What's the Story) Morning Glory? – Oasis
- Brits Performance of 30 Years: "Wannabe" & "Who Do You Think You Are" – The Spice Girls
- Outstanding Contribution to Music: Robbie Williams

=== Classical BRIT Awards ===
The Classical BRIT Awards were hosted by Myleene Klass on 13 May 2010.

- Male Artist of the Year – Vasily Petrenko
- Female Artist of the Year – Angela Gheorghiu
- Composer of the Year – Thomas Ades – The Tempest
- Young British Classical Performer or Group of the Year – Jack Liebeck
- Album of the Year – Only Men Aloud! – Band of Brothers
- Soundtrack of the Year – Revolutionary Road – Thomas Newman
- Critics' Award – Orchestra e Coro dell'Accademia Nazionale di Santa Cecilia, conducted by Antonio Pappano with Rolando Villazón, Anja Harteros, Sonja Ganassi and Rene Pape – Messa da Requiem
- Lifetime Achievement in Music – Kiri Te Kanawa

=== Ivor Novello Awards ===
The 55th Ivor Novello Awards were held on 20 May 2010 at Grosvenor House, London.

- Best Song Musically and Lyrically: "The Fear" – Lily Allen (written by Lily Allen and Greg Kurstin)
- Album Award: Sunny Side Up – Paolo Nutini
- Best Contemporary Song: "Daniel" – Bat for Lashes (written by Natasha Khan)
- PRS Most Performed Work: "The Fear" – Lily Allen
- International Achievement: Imogen Heap
- Ivors Inspiration Award: Johnny Marr
- Ivors Classical Music Award: Sir Peter Maxwell Davies
- PRS For Music Outstanding Contribution to British Music: Trevor Horn
- Lifetime Achievement: Paul Weller
- Academy Fellowship: Sir Tim Rice
- Special International Award: Neil Sedaka
- Songwriters of the Year: Lily Allen and Greg Kurstin
- Best Television Soundtrack: Desperate Romantics (composed by Daniel Pemberton)
- Best Original Film Score: Ice Age 3: Dawn of the Dinosaurs (composed by John Powell)
- Best Original Video Game Score: Killzone 2 (composed by Joris de Man)

=== Mercury Prize ===
The 2010 Mercury Prize was awarded on 7 September 2010 to The xx for their album xx.

=== Popjustice £20 Music Prize ===
The 2010 Popjustice £20 Music Prize was awarded on 7 September 2010 to Example for his song "Kickstarts".

=== British Composer Awards ===
The 8th British Composer Awards were held on 30 November 2010 at Stationers' Hall, London. BBC Radio 3 presenters Sara Mohr-Pietsch and Andrew McGregor hosted the awards, which were presented by Jude Kelly.

- Chamber: Northwest Wind – Raymond Yiu
- Community or Educational Project: James Watt: Head of Steam – Karen MacIver
- Vocal: Augenlieder – Ryan Wigglesworth
- Contemporary Jazz Composition: The Causeway Suite – James Hamilton
- Instrumental Solo or Duo: Lieux Retrouvés – Thomas Adès
- Sonic Art: Installation for 300 Speakers, Pianola and Vacuum Cleaner – John Wynne
- Choral: Psalm No 140 "Deliver me, O Lord" – Sasha Siem
- International Award: Concerto for Cello and Orchestra – Unsuk Chin
- Stage Works: Kaspar Hauser – Rory Boyle
- Liturgical: Psalm No 1 "Blessed Is the Man" – Cheryl Frances-Hoad
- Wind Band or Brass Band: Cloud Atlas – Philip Grange
- Making Music Award: Fall – Kerry Andrew
- Orchestral: Doubles – Brian Elias

=== Record of the Year ===
The Record of the Year was awarded on 10 December 2010 to Owl City for their song "Fireflies".

== Deaths ==
- 2 January – John Rhys Evans, operatic baritone, 79
- 11 January – Mick Green, English guitarist (Johnny Kidd & The Pirates), 65
- 28 January – Alistair Hulett, folk singer, 58 (liver failure)
- 6 February – Sir John Dankworth, jazz composer and musician, 82
- 9 February – Malcolm Vaughan, singer and actor, 80
- 13 February – John Reed, actor, singer, and dancer, 94
- 23 February – Wyn Morris, conductor, 81
- 5 March – Philip Langridge, operatic tenor, 70
- 27 March – Stanley Vann, composer, organist, choral conductor, and choir trainer, 100
- 1 April – Morag Beaton, opera singer, 83
- 8 April – Malcolm McLaren, impresario and former Sex Pistols manager, 64 (peritoneal mesothelioma)
- 9 April – Kenneth McKellar, tenor, 82
- 10 May – Jack Birkett, dancer, singer, mime artist and actor, 75
- 7 June – Stuart Cable, drummer, 40 (choked on vomit)
- 8 June – Crispian St. Peters, singer-songwriter, 71
- 21 June
  - Chris Sievey, comedian and musician, 54 (cancer)
  - Tam White, musician and actor, 67 (heart attack)
- 23 June – Pete Quaife, English bass player (The Kinks), 66 (kidney failure)
- 29 June – Alf Carretta, lead singer of The Zimmers, 93
- 1 July – John Paynter, composer and music educator, 78
- 5 July – David Fanshawe, composer, 68 (stroke)
- 21 July – Anthony Rolfe Johnson, tenor, 69
- 17 August – Bill Millin, British Army soldier and piper during WWII (born 1922)
- 21 September – Geoffrey Burgon, film and TV score composer, 69
- 10 October – Alison Stephens, English mandolin player, 40 (cervical cancer)
- 30 October – Morris Pert, Scottish composer, drummer /percussionist and pianist, 62
- 25 November – Peter Christopherson, musician, 55
- 16 December – Richard Adeney, British flautist, 90

== See also ==
- 2010 in British radio
- 2010 in British television
- 2010 in the United Kingdom
- List of British films of 2010
