= 1999 in British radio =

This is a list of events on British radio during 1999.

== Events ==
- BBC Radio Wales begins to appear on FM in the major conurbations for the first time. Previously, apart from in Gwent, the station had only been available on MW with the allocated block of FM frequencies for local broadcasting in Wales, which was only available in parts of the country, used by BBC Radio Cymru as BBC management had concluded that BBC Radio Cymru would not have enough listeners to merit nationwide coverage on a medium wave frequency.

=== January ===
- 3 January
  - On BBC Radio 2, David Jacobs introduces Frank Sinatra: A Man and His Music, a one-hour television concert recorded in the 1960s.
  - On BBC Radio 1, Coldplay become the first unsigned band to guest on Steve Lamacq's Evening Session.
- 22 January – Church leaders condemn Birmingham-based station BRMB's "Two Strangers and a Wedding" competition in which contestants enter a competition to marry a complete stranger. The winners, Greg Cordell and Carla Germaine are married at a Registry Office in the city, but the couple separates three months later. Germaine later meets and marries BRMB disc jockey Jeremy Kyle.
- Undated in January
  - Choice FM is taken over by the Chrysalis Group, which later renames it Choice FM Birmingham Galaxy 102.2.
  - London's dance/urban station Kiss 100 is rebranded by EMAP Radio with a new logo. The station introduces a more mainstream pop-orientated playlist which has led to criticism from some DJs and listeners.

=== February to March ===
- No events.

=== April ===
- 9 April – Roger Bolton presents his first edition of Feedback on BBC Radio 4. He will continue to host it until 2022.
- 26 April – BBC Radio 2 presenter Johnnie Walker is suspended from his drivetime show after a tabloid exposé of his cocaine problem in the Sunday News of the World. Richard Allinson presents the drivetime show during Walker's absence, while Tom Robinson stands in on his Saturday afternoon show.
- Undated in April – Radio Regen is launched in Manchester to provide training in community radio. It broadcasts a two-month-long temporary radio station called City Centre Life 87.7.

=== May ===
- 14 May – The final Lunchtime Concerto, which had aired on weekdays at 2pm since the station’s launch, is broadcast on Classic FM, ahead of a schedule refresh which includes the launch the next day of a new nightly magazine slot Tonight at Eleven.
- 24 May – Radio 2 says that presenter Sarah Kennedy is taking a week's holiday because of stress following a bizarre performance while standing in for Terry Wogan the previous Friday. This had included calling Ken Bruce an "old fool" and referring to the presenter of the day's Pause For Thought slot as "an old prune". The episode attracted a number of concerned calls to the BBC, while Kennedy blames the incident on a lack of sleep the previous night and apologises to listeners. She had been due to stand in for Wogan the following week, but takes time off instead.

=== June ===
- Undated in June – Launch of Sky News Radio, a service providing bespoke bulletins for Talk Radio UK.
- 18 June – Des Lynam presents his last Friday evening show on Radio 2.

=== July ===
- 2 July – Ed Stewart presents his final weekday afternoon show on BBC Radio 2 as he moves to weekends.
- 3 July – Jonathan Ross joins BBC Radio 2 to present a Saturday morning show.
- 5 July – Steve Wright in the Afternoon returns to radio after a break of six years as Steve Wright replaces Ed Stewart as Radio 2's weekday afternoon presenter.

=== August ===
- 2 August – It is announced that ITV has signed BBC sports presenter Des Lynam on a four-year contract to become the company's main football presenter. Consequently, he will no longer present his Friday drivetime show on Radio 2.
- 19 August – BBC Radio 1 broadcasts its first split programming when it introduces weekly national new music shows for Scotland, Wales and Northern Ireland. New presenters include Huw Stephens and Bethan Elfyn.

=== September ===
- 11 September – BBC Radio 3's breakfast programme On Air is renamed Morning on 3.
- 13 September – Late Junction is broadcast on BBC Radio 3 for the first time.
- 19 September
  - The first edition of a new Sunday evening advice programme called The Surgery is broadcast on BBC Radio 1 and Sara Cox joins.
  - Thirteen years after Radio Victory had stopped broadcasting, Victory FM starts broadcasting to the Portsmouth area on a permanent basis, after six 28-day RSL FM broadcasts which took place between 1994 and 1998. Within weeks, the station is acquired by TLRC.

=== October ===
- 14 October – Managers at BBC Radio 2 reinstate Johnnie Walker after he is fined £2,000 by magistrates for admitting possession of cocaine; he will return to the airwaves on 6 December.

=== November ===
- 15 November – Britain's first national commercial DAB digital radio multiplex, Digital One, goes on air to England, and parts of Scotland and Wales (it does not become available in Northern Ireland until 2013). The stations carried on D1 at launch include the three national commercial AM/FM services – Classic FM, Virgin Radio (later Absolute) and Talk Radio UK (later talkSPORT) – along with two new digital-first stations – fresh pop service Core and classic rock station Planet Rock, both at this time under the ownership of Classic FM's then parent (and Digital One shareholder) GWR Group.

=== December ===
- 5 December – Despite having been denied airplay by many radio stations, and panned by critics, Cliff Richard's single "The Millennium Prayer" – which features Richard singing the words of the Lord's Prayer to the tune of "Auld Lang Syne" – reaches number one in the UK charts.
- 6 December – Johnnie Walker returns to BBC Radio 2 after his suspension.
- 17 December – Britain's first million pounds prize is given away, on a segment of Chris Evans' Virgin Radio breakfast show called Someone's Going to be a Millionaire (a reference to ITV's Who Wants to Be a Millionaire?, which at the time has not had a million pound winner).

=== Unknown ===
- BBC Radio 1 establishes its Live Lounge as part of the mid-morning show.
- Bedford station B97 is rebranded back to its original name of Chiltern FM.

== Station debuts ==
- 1 February – Mansfield 103.2
- 8 February – FLR 107.3
- 20 March – Tower FM
- 3 May – Telford FM
- 18 June – Sky News Radio
- 26 June – Fire 107.6
- 24 July – 106.8 Lite FM
- 30 August –
  - Wave 102
  - The Revolution
- 5 September – SouthCity FM
- 19 September – Victory FM
- 3 October –
  - Fen Radio 107.5
  - Ridings FM
  - Win 107.2
- 7 November – Yorkshire Coast Radio Bridlington
- 15 November –
  - Core Radio
  - Planet Rock
  - Bath FM
- 19 November –
  - Beat 106
  - 107 The Edge
- 1 December – South Hams Radio

== Programme debuts ==
- January – Bangers and Mash on BBC Radio 4 (1999)
- 11 February – It's Been a Bad Week on BBC Radio 2 (1999–2006)
- 27 February – Heated Rollers on BBC Radio 2 (1999)
- 8 April – The Country Show with Bob Harris on BBC Radio 2 (1999–present)
- 3 July – Jonathan Ross on BBC Radio 2 (1999–2010)
- 13 September – Late Junction on BBC Radio 3 (1999–present)
- 12 November – The Attractive Young Rabbi on BBC Radio 4 (1999–2002)

== Changes of network affiliation ==
Shows	Moved from	Moved to
Steve Wright in the Afternoon	BBC Radio 1	BBC Radio 2

== Returning this year after a break of one year or longer ==
- 5 July – Steve Wright in the Afternoon on BBC Radio 2 (1981–1993, 1999–2022)

== Continuing radio programmes ==
=== 1940s ===
- Sunday Half Hour (1940–2018)
- Desert Island Discs (1942–Present)
- Letter from America (1946–2004)
- Woman's Hour (1946–Present)
- A Book at Bedtime (1949–Present)

=== 1950s ===
- The Archers (1950–Present)
- The Today Programme (1957–Present)
- Sing Something Simple (1959–2001)
- Your Hundred Best Tunes (1959–2007)

=== 1960s ===
- Farming Today (1960–Present)
- In Touch (1961–Present)
- The World at One (1965–Present)
- The Official Chart (1967–Present)
- Just a Minute (1967–Present)
- The Living World (1968–Present)
- The Organist Entertains (1969–2018)

=== 1970s ===
- PM (1970–Present)
- Start the Week (1970–Present)
- You and Yours (1970–Present)
- I'm Sorry I Haven't a Clue (1972–Present)
- Good Morning Scotland (1973–Present)
- Newsbeat (1973–Present)
- The News Huddlines (1975–2001)
- File on 4 (1977–Present)
- Money Box (1977–Present)
- The News Quiz (1977–Present)
- Feedback (1979–Present)
- The Food Programme (1979–Present)
- Science in Action (1979–Present)

=== 1980s ===
- In Business (1983–Present)
- Sounds of the 60s (1983–Present)
- Loose Ends (1986–Present)

=== 1990s ===
- The Moral Maze (1990–Present)
- Essential Selection (1991–Present)
- No Commitments (1992–2007)
- The Pepsi Chart (1993–2002)
- Wake Up to Wogan (1993–2009)
- Essential Mix (1993–Present)
- Up All Night (1994–Present)
- Wake Up to Money (1994–Present)
- Private Passions (1995–Present)
- Parkinson's Sunday Supplement (1996–2007)
- The David Jacobs Collection (1996–2013)
- Westway (1997–2005)
- The 99p Challenge (1998–2004)
- Puzzle Panel (1998–2005)
- Drivetime with Johnnie Walker (1998–2006)
- Sunday Night at 10 (1998–2013)
- In Our Time (1998–Present)
- Material World (1998–Present)
- Scott Mills (1998–2022)
- The Now Show (1998–Present)

== Ending this year ==
- 28 January – World of Pub (1998–1999)
- 25 February – Blue Jam (1997–1999)
- 30 March – Chambers (1996–1999)
- 25 May – Julie Enfield Investigates (1994–1999)
- 18 June – Des Lynam (1998–1999)
- 2 July – The Ed Stewart Weekday Afternoon Show on BBC Radio 2 (1991–1999)

== Closing this year ==
- 22 May –
  - Goldbeat (1995–1999)
  - Heartbeat 1521 (1996–1999)

== Deaths ==
- 10 March – Adrian Love, 54, radio presenter
- 13 March – Olive Shapley, 88, radio documentary producer and broadcaster
- 3 June – Peter Brough, 83, radio ventriloquist [sic.]
- 11 August – Don Mosey, 74, cricket commentator
- 7 October – Deryck Guyler, 85, actor
- 22 November – Ian Messiter, 79, panel game creator
- 15 December – George Elrick, 95, Scottish bandleader and DJ

== See also ==
- 1999 in British music
- 1999 in British television
- 1999 in the United Kingdom
- List of British films of 1999
