= Wilfrid Mellers =

English music critic and composer (1914–2008)

Wilfrid Howard Mellers OBE (26 April 1914 – 17 May 2008) was an English music critic, musicologist and composer.

== Early life ==
Born in Leamington, Warwickshire, Mellers was educated at the local Leamington College and later won a scholarship to Downing College, Cambridge, where he read English under F. R. Leavis. He later lodged with the Leavises for three years while pursuing a Music degree. Mellers also took private composition lessons in Oxford from Egon Wellesz and Edmund Rubbra. From 1938 he taught at Dartington Hall, and in September 1940 he married Vera Muriel Hobbs. He spent the Second World War working on the land as a conscientious objector.

== Career ==
After writing many articles for Leavis's journal Scrutiny since the September 1936 issue, he appeared on the editorial board of the January 1942 issue, and continued in that position until the December 1948 issue. Mellers also wrote regularly as a critic and reviewer for New Statesman, The Listener, The New Republic, The Times Literary Supplement and The Musical Times.

In 1945 Mellers was appointed to teach English and music at Downing College, and from 1948 until 1964 he became extramural tutor in music at Birmingham University. While there he established a series of music summer schools for adults at Attingham Park in Shropshire, attracting prominent international composers, performers and scholars to help. From 1960 for two years he lived and worked in America as Andrew Mellon visiting professor of music at the University of Pittsburgh.

From 1964 until 1981 he was founding professor and head of the Music Department at the University of York; he remained emeritus professor of music there until his death. In contrast to most university music departments at the time which were dominated by musicology, Mellers focused the courses on performance leading towards composition and staffed his department with young composers, including Peter Aston, David Blake, Bernard Rands, and Robert Sherlaw Johnson. John Paynter joined a little later.

He was also an honorary fellow at Downing College, Cambridge. On 12 July 1981, he received an honorary degree of music from the City University, London.

Following a divorce from Vera, Mellers married the singer Peggy Pauline Lewis in 1950. They divorced in 1976. He married for a third time in 1987 to Robin Stephanie Hildyard. There were four daughters. He died in 2008 aged 94 of heart disease at his home, The Granary, Plaster Pitts Farm, Scrayingham, near Malton, in Yorkshire.

== Writing ==
In his writings, Mellers continuously combined his interest in music with literature, philosophy and social history. His early publications include Music and Society (1946) and François Couperin and the French Classical Tradition (1950), the first major study of Couperin. Visiting America in the early 1960s he developed a lasting interest in the music of Aaron Copland, Charles Ives, Marc Blitzstein and others. Out of that period came the book Music in a New Found Land (1964).

At some risk of being accused of "trendiness" Mellers also began writing about popular music, including the Beatles and Bob Dylan. In Caliban Reborn (1967), he argues: "Developments in pop music cannot be isolated from what is happening in 'serious' music, and the West's veering towards the East and the primitive can be understood only as complementary to the East's need of the West". The passages on the Beatles were later expanded into a longer study, Twilight of the Gods (1973), drawing criticism from both his academic colleagues and from the pop world, which regarded it as "professional interference". Peter Dickinson has pointed out that Mellers "anticipated the pluralism and multi-culturalism of the twenty-first century rather than the inherited distinctions between highbrow and lowbrow".

Preoccupations such as music as a language ("the most probing we have") and the relationship between modern complexity and "Edenic" innocence became evident. His later books Bach and the Dance of God (1981), Beethoven and the Voice of God and Vaughan Williams and the Voice of Albion (1989) proceeded from visionary social and philosophical bases, "spiritual if not specifically religious", commented The Times. Between Old Worlds and New (1997) collects his occasional writings and includes a list of compositions. His final book, Celestial Music (2002) was a study of religious masterpieces.

== Music ==
As a composer, Mellers completed several operas (he destroyed some others), works for chamber ensembles, two large-scale compositions for keyboard instruments and many songs and choral works, including settings of William Blake, Gerard Manley Hopkins, Kathleen Raine and many American poets. His early works show the influence of Tudor and Baroque forms, using a chromatic and often polyphonic musical style. His visits to America exposed his music to influences well beyond the European tradition.

Poetry and drama are often central. Rose of May: A Threnody for Ophelia, scored for speaker, soprano, flute, clarinet and string quartet, is based on the scene from Hamlet. It was commissioned by the Cheltenham Festival in 1964, where it was performed by Diana Rigg, April Cantelo and the Wigmore Ensemble". His two surviving operas, including The Tragicall History of Christopher Marlowe (1950–52), were withdrawn after workshop performances and remain unpublished.

Jazz, folk and indigenous music, as a representation of the social forces of music, is another common thread. Yeibichai, premiered at the BBC Proms in 1969, combines a jazz trio with scat singer, chorus, coloratura soprano, orchestra and electronic devices. Life Cycle (1970) for orchestra and youth choir uses free improvisation applied to Eskimo melodies. It was recorded by the University of York Chorus and Orchestra, conducted by Peter Aston. Shaman Songs (1980) is scored for flutes doubling saxophones, keyboards, electric bass and percussion and was written for Barbara Thompson and her Jazz Paraphernalia.

The virtuosic and extensive Natalis Invicti Solis (1969) for solo piano uses corn dances of the Tewa Indians of New Mexico for some of its material. Opus Alchymicum (1969) for organ, his second large-scale keyboard work, uses the principles of alchemical studies interpreted by Jung as a starting point for musical processes. It has been recorded by Kevin Bowyer. Another notable large scale piece is Sun-flower: The Divine Tetrad of William Blake (1972–3) for solo voices and orchestra, described by Roger Carpenter as his magnum opus.

The 2004 York Late Music Festival opened with a weekend tribute to Mellers. A 90th-birthday tribute concert was held in October 2004 at Downing College, featuring music by Mellers as well as new pieces written for the occasion by Stephen Dodgson, David Matthews and Howard Skempton, among others.

Campion Records issued recordings of music written both by and for Wilfrid Mellers in 2006. They include The Echoing Green (three Blake settings for soprano and recorder), A Blue Epiphany for J.B. Smith for solo guitar, and A Fount of Fair Dances for recorder and string orchestra. The 1949 Sonata for viola and piano has been recorded by Sarah-Jane Bradley and John Lenehan.

== Bibliography ==
- Music and Society: England and the European Tradition (1946)
- Studies in Contemporary Music (1947)
- François Couperin & the French Classical Tradition (1950)
- Music in the Making (1951)
- Romanticism and the 20th Century, from 1800 (1957)
- The Sonata Principle, from c. 1750 (1957)
- Man and His Music (1962; Vols. 3 & 4 by Mellers)
- Music in a New Found Land: Themes and Developments in the History of American Music (1964)
- Harmonious Meeting: A Study of the Relationship Between English Music, Poetry and Theatre, c.1600 (1965)
- Caliban Reborn: Renewal in Twentieth-Century Music (1968)
- Twilight of the Gods: The Beatles in Retrospect (1973)
- Bach and the Dance of God (1980)
- Beethoven and the Voice of God (1983)
- A Darker Shade of Pale: A Backdrop to Bob Dylan (1984)
- Angels of the Night: Popular Female Singers of Our Time (1986)
- Le jardin retrouvé : The Music of Frederic Mompou, 1893-1987 (1987)
- The Masks of Orpheus: Seven Stages in the Story of European Music (1987)
- Vaughan Williams and the Vision of Albion (1989)
- Percy Grainger (1992)
- Francis Poulenc (1993)
- Between Old Worlds and New (1997)
- Singing in the Wilderness: Music and Ecology in the Twentieth Century (2001)
- Celestial Music?: Some Masterpieces of European Religious Music (2002)

== Selected works ==
- Four Short Shakespeare Songs, for women's voices (1944)
- Two Motets for mixed voices and brass (1945)
- The Forgotten Garden, cantata for tenor and string quartet, text Henry Vaughan (1945)
- Trio for violin, viola and cello (1945)
- The Song of Ruth, cantata for soloists, chorus and orchestra (1948)
- Viola Sonata (1949)
- The Tragicall History of Christopher Marlowe, opera (1950–52)
- Yggdrasil, cantata for soloists, chorus and chamber orchestra, text Christopher Hassall (1951)
- The Shepherd’s Daughter, chamber opera (1954)
- The Borderline, opera, text David Holbrook (1958)
- The Hedge of Flowers, masque for girls voices, text David Holbrook (1960)
- Spells, song cycle for soprano and chamber ensemble, text Kathleen Raine (1960)
- Journey to Love, song cycle for soprano and piano, text William Carlos Williams (1960)
- Missa Brevis for mixed chorus and chamber organ (1961)
- Chants and Litanies of Carl Sandberg for male chorus, piano and percussion (1961)
- A Ballad of Anyone for soprano, chorus and piano, text e.e.cummings (1961)
- Rose of May: A Threnody for Ophelia, scored for speaker, soprano, flute, clarinet and string quartet (1964)
- Canticum Resurrectionis, song cycle for chorus, text Gerard Manley Hopkins (1968)
- Cloud Canticle for double chorus, text Ronald Johnson (1969)
- Life Cycle (1970) cantata for orchestra and youth choir, texts from 'Primitive Song', tr. Maurice Bowra (1969)
- Natalis Invicti Solis for piano (1969)
- Opus Alchymicum for organ (1969)
- Yeibichai for jazz trio, scat singer, chorus, coloratura soprano, orchestra and electronics, text Gary Snyder (1969)
- The Word Unborn for double chorus and ensemble, text Ronald Duncan (1970)
- Sun-flower: The Divine Tetrad of William Blake for solo voices and orchestra (1972–3)
- A Blue Epiphany for J.B. Smith for guitar (1973)
- The Echoing Green, song cycle, text William Blake (1974, revised 1996)
- Threnody for 11 strings, in memory of Egon Wellesz (1975)
- White Bird Blues for miming, dancing soprano and free bass accordion (1975)
- A Fount of Fair Dances for recorder and string orchestra (1976)
- Shaman Songs for jazz ensemble (1980)
- An Aubade for Indra, clarinet and string quartet (1981)
- Glorificamus, for double brass choir (1981)
- The Wellspring of Loves, concerto for violin, strings and percussion (1981)
