= 1999 in British music =

This is a summary of 1999 in music in the United Kingdom.

== Events ==
- January – The film Hilary and Jackie, starring Emily Watson and James Frain as Jacqueline du Pré and Daniel Barenboim, is released.
- 3 January – Steps score their first number one in the UK singles chart with "Heartbeat / Tragedy".
- 7 January
  - After eight years of marriage, Rod Stewart and his wife Rachel Hunter announce they are separating.
  - Paul McCartney is present at his daughter Heather's latest launch event in Georgia, United States.
- 10 February – Iron Maiden announces that singer Bruce Dickinson and guitarist Adrian Smith have rejoined the band, while lead singer Blaze Bayley has left. This means the band now has three lead guitarists.
- 14 February – Elton John appears as himself in a special episode of the animated series The Simpsons
- 16 February – Belle & Sebastian win the British Breakthrough Award at the Brit Awards, leading to allegations that voting was rigged in their favour and that Steps would have won. Fans of Belle & Sebastian argued that the band have a large student following, and felt that the award should be given in recognition of artistic merit, rather than popularity or CD sales.
- 25 February – The Quintet for trumpet and strings by Peter Maxwell Davies is performed for the first time in the Mitchell Hall, University of Aberdeen.
- 21 March – Irish girl group B*Witched score a fourth consecutive number one in the UK singles chart with "Blame It on the Weatherman", thus becoming the first band to have all their first four singles enter at the top and setting a new record that would be broken a year later by Westlife.
- 10 April – A charity tribute, the Concert for Linda McCartney, is held at the Royal Albert Hall in London, hosted by Eddie Izzard, with proceeds going to animal rights causes. Performers include Paul McCartney, Chrissie Hynde, Elvis Costello, Sinéad O'Connor, and Tom Jones.
- 28 April – The Verve split for the second time. Frontman Richard Ashcroft launches a solo career.
- 27 May – The British Academy of Songwriters, Composers and Authors establishes its new fellowship, the first recipient being Martin Gore.
- 7 June – S Club 7 release their debut single "Bring It All Back", which goes to number one in the UK singles chart.
- 27 June – The first performance of Tobias and the Angel, a one act church cantata by Jonathan Dove, takes place at Christ Church, Highbury as part of the Almeida Festival, directed by Kate Brown.
- 28 August – Former Dexys Midnight Runners frontman Kevin Rowland is bottled offstage at the Reading Festival, which saw him perform "The Greatest Love of All" whilst wearing a white dress.
- 29 August – Paul "Bonehead" Arthurs and Paul "Guigsy" McGuigan leave Oasis. They are replaced by Colin "Gem" Archer, formerly of Heavy Stereo and Andy Bell, formerly of Ride and Hurricane#1.
- 18 September – The first performance of Cyril Rootham‘s The Lady of Shalott, a setting of Tennyson’s poem for mezzo-soprano, chorus and orchestra, takes place in the School Hall, Eton College, by the Broadheath Singers and the Windsor Sinfonia, conducted by Robert Tucker. Rootham wrote the piece circa 1909–1910, but it was not performed in his lifetime.
- 21 September – David Bowie releases Hours, his twenty-first studio album and the first by a major artist to be made legally available as an electronic download.
- 12 November – At Bristol Crown Court, former glam rock star Gary Glitter is jailed for four months for downloading child pornography.
- 2 December – James MacMillan's Symphony No. 2 receives its premiere at Ayr Town Hall by the Scottish Chamber Symphony, with the composer conducting.
- 30 December – George Harrison and his wife Olivia fight off a knife attack by an intruder in his Friar Park home.
- December – Alan McGee announces the dissolution of Creation Records after 16 years. The final release for the label would be Primal Scream's album "XTRMNTR", released in January 2000.

== Classical works ==
- Arthur Butterworth – Bubu for English horn, viola and harp, Op. 107
- Alun Hoddinott – Symphony No. 10
- Joe Jackson – Symphony No. 1
- James MacMillan, Symphony No. 2
- Julian Stewart Lindsay – Vox Dei
- Roger Smalley – Crepuscule, for piano quartet
- Raymond Yiu – Tranced

== Opera ==
- David Blake – Scoring A Century
- Jonathan Dove – Tobias and the Angel

== Musical theatre ==
- 6 April – Mamma Mia!, with book by Catherine Johnson and songs by Björn Ulvaeus and Benny Andersson, opens at the Prince Edward Theatre. It would later transfer to the Prince of Wales Theatre on 9 June 2004, continuing its run until September 2012, when it moved to the Novello Theatre.

== Musical films ==
- Topsy-Turvy, starring Allan Corduner as Sir Arthur Sullivan and Jim Broadbent as W. S. Gilbert

== Film scores and incidental music ==
=== Film ===
- Michael Nyman – Wonderland
- Rachel Portman – The Cider House Rules

=== Television ===
- Murray Gold – Queer as Folk

== Music awards ==
=== BRIT Awards ===
The 1999 BRIT Awards winners were:

- Best soundtrack: Titanic
- British album: Manic Street Preachers – This Is My Truth Tell Me Yours
- British breakthrough act: Belle & Sebastian
- British dance act: Fatboy Slim
- British female solo artist: Des'ree
- British group: Manic Street Preachers
- British male solo artist: Robbie Williams
- British single: Robbie Williams – "Angels"
- British video: Robbie Williams – "Millennium"
- International breakthrough act: Natalie Imbruglia
- International female: Natalie Imbruglia
- International group: The Corrs
- International male: Beck
- Outstanding contribution: Eurythmics

=== Mercury Music Prize ===
The 1999 Mercury Music Prize was awarded to Talvin Singh – Ok.

=== Record of the Year ===
The Record of the Year was awarded to "Flying Without Wings" by Westlife.

== Births ==
- 28 January – Hrvy, singer
- April – S1mba, rapper
- 4 April – Sheku Kanneh-Mason, award-winning cellist
- 9 December – Aitch, rapper

== Deaths ==
- 14 January – Bryn Jones, British ethnic electronica and experimental musician, 37 (infection)
- 23 February – Ruth Gipps, composer, oboist, pianist and impresario, 78
- 2 March – Dusty Springfield, singer, 59 (breast cancer)
- 12 March – Yehudi Menuhin, violinist and musical director, 82
- 21 March – Ernie Wise, entertainer, 73
- 3 April – Lionel Bart, songwriter, 68 (cancer)
- 6 April – William Pleeth, cellist, 83
- 14 April – Anthony Newley, songwriter, actor and singer, 67
- 26 April – Adrian Borland, songwriter, 41
- 29 April – Perry Ford, singer, 65
- 30 April – Darrell Sweet, drummer, 51
- 18 May – Freddy Randall, jazz trumpeter, 78
- 19 May – James Blades, orchestral percussionist, 97
- 16 June – Screaming Lord Sutch, pop musician and politician, 58
- 12 July – Bill Owen, actor and songwriter, 85 (pancreatic cancer)
- 17 July – Kevin Wilkinson, drummer, 41
- 27 July – Amaryllis Fleming, cellist, 73
- 2 August – Eric Hope, pianist, 84
- 25 August – Rob Fisher, keyboard player, 42
- 17 September – Frankie Vaughan, singer, 71 (heart failure)
- 1 October – Lena Zavaroni, singer, 35 (pneumonia)
- 7 October – Deryck Guyler, actor and washboard player, 85
- 15 October – Josef Locke, tenor, 82
- 18 October – Tony Crombie, jazz drummer, pianist, composer and bandleader, 74
- 21 October – Queenie Ashton, singer and actress, 96
- 31 October – Howard Ferguson, composer and musicologist, 91
- 11 November – Thomas Pitfield, composer, artist and writer, 96
- 14 November – Minna Keal, composer, 90
- 7 December – Kenny Baker, jazz trumpeter, 78

== See also ==
- 1999 in British music charts
- 1999 in British radio
- 1999 in British television
- 1999 in the United Kingdom
- List of British films of 1999
