= Bangers and mash (disambiguation) =

Bangers and mash is a British colloquial name for sausages served with mashed potato.

Bangers and mash may also refer to:

- Bangers and Mash (radio show), a BBC radio show
- Bangers and Mash (TV series), a children's television series in 1989 on ITV
- "Bangers And Mash", a 1961 comic song by Peter Sellers and Sophia Loren, a follow-up to their single "Goodness Gracious Me"
- "Bangers + Mash", a song by Radiohead, released on the In Rainbows bonus disc
- Bangerz and Mash, two characters in the PlayStation 2 video game Dragon Quest VIII
