= List of British films of 1999 =

This is a list of British films released in 1999.

== 1999 ==
Title	Director	Cast	Genre	Notes
1999
8½ Women	Peter Greenaway	John Standing	Drama	Entered into the 1999 Cannes Film Festival
All the Little Animals	Jeremy Thomas	John Hurt, Christian Bale	Adventure	
Angela's Ashes	Alan Parker	Emily Watson	Drama	
Ashes to Ashes	Wayne Gerard Trotman	Gary Cameron, Jason Ninh Cao, Keith McCoy	Action	Independent film set in London
Beautiful People	Jasmin Dizdar	Rosalind Ayres, Julian Firth	Comedy	
The Clandestine Marriage	Christopher Miles	Nigel Hawthorne, Joan Collins	Comedy	Based on the play The Clandestine Marriage
Cotton Mary	Ismail Merchant, Madhur Jaffrey	Greta Scacchi, James Wilby	Drama	
The Criminal	Julian Simpson	Steven Mackintosh, Eddie Izzard, Natasha Little	Thriller	
Darkness Falls	Gerry Lively	Sherilyn Fenn, Ray Winstone	Drama	
The Debt Collector	Anthony Neilson	Billy Connolly, Ken Stott, Francesca Annis	Thriller	
Dreaming of Joseph Lees	Eric Styles	Rupert Graves, Samantha Morton	Romantic drama	
The Duke	Philip Spink	John Neville, James Doohan, Courtnee Draper	Comedic drama	
East Is East	Damien O'Donnell	Om Puri, Linda Bassett	Comedy	
The End of the Affair	Neil Jordan	Ralph Fiennes, Julianne Moore, Stephen Rea	Romantic drama	
Eyes Wide Shut	Stanley Kubrick	Tom Cruise, Nicole Kidman, Sydney Pollack, Marie Richardson	Erotic mystery psychological drama	
Faeries	Gary Hurst	Kate Winslet, Jeremy Irons	Animated fantasy	
Fanny and Elvis	Kay Mellor	Kerry Fox, Ray Winstone	Comedy	
Felicia's Journey	Atom Egoyan	Bob Hoskins, Elaine Cassidy	Drama	
G:MT - Greenwich Mean Time	John Strickland	Steve John Shepherd, Ben Waters	Drama	
Gregory's Two Girls	Bill Forsyth	John Gordon Sinclair, Carly McKinnon	Romantic comedy	
Grey Owl	Richard Attenborough	Pierce Brosnan	Biopic	
Guest House Paradiso	Adrian Edmondson	Rik Mayall, Adrian Edmondson, Vincent Cassel, Hélène Mahieu, Bill Nighy, Simon Pegg, Fenella Fielding, Lisa Palfrey, Kate Ashfield	Slapstick comedy	
The Harpist	Hansjorg Thurn	Christien Anholt, Colin Baker, Geraldine O'Rawe	Drama	
Human Traffic	Justin Kerrigan	John Simm, Danny Dyer	Comedy	
An Ideal Husband	Oliver Parker	Cate Blanchett, Julianne Moore, Jeremy Northam	Comedy	Based on the play by Oscar Wilde
The Last September	Deborah Warner	Maggie Smith, Michael Gambon	Drama	
The Loss of Sexual Innocence	Mike Figgis	Julian Sands, Saffron Burrows	Drama	
Mad Cows	Sara Sugarman	Anna Friel, Joanna Lumley	Comedy	
Mansfield Park	Patricia Rozema	Frances O'Connor, Jonny Lee Miller	Romantic drama	
Milk	William Brookfield	James Fleet, Phyllida Law	Comedy	
The Miracle Maker	Derek W. Hayes, Stanislav Sokolov	Ralph Fiennes, Julie Christie, Richard E. Grant, Ian Holm, Michael Bryant, Emily Mortimer, Alfred Molina	Animation drama historical	Co-production with Russia
Miss Julie	Mike Figgis	Saffron Burrows, Peter Mullan	Drama	
Moose 2	John Lasseter	Andrew Stanton	Animation	Direct-to-video, United Kingdom
My Life So Far	Hugh Hudson	Colin Firth, Rosemary Harris	Comedy	
Notting Hill	Roger Michell	Julia Roberts, Hugh Grant	Romance	
Onegin	Martha Fiennes	Ralph Fiennes, Liv Tyler, Toby Stephens	Drama	
Parting Shots	Michael Winner	Chris Rea, Felicity Kendal, Bob Hoskins	Crime comedy	
Plunkett & Macleane	Jake Scott	Robert Carlyle, Jonny Lee Miller	Historical crime	
Ratcatcher	Lynne Ramsay	Tommy Flanagan, William Eadie	Drama	
Reflections	Pogus Caesar	Martina Mavis Clark, James Herbert, Edwin Ho	Documentary	
Rogue Trader	James Dearden	Ewan McGregor, Anna Friel, Tim McInnerny	Drama	
A Room for Romeo Brass	Shane Meadows	Martin Arrowsmith, Dave Blant	Dramatic comedy	
Sacred Flesh	Nigel Wingrove	Sally Tremaine, Moyna Cope	Sexploitation	
Simon Magus	Ben Hopkins			Entered into the 49th Berlin International Film Festival
Sleepy Hollow	Tim Burton	Johnny Depp, Christina Ricci, Miranda Richardson, Michael Gambon, Casper Van Dien, Jeffrey Jones	Gothic supernatural horror	Co-production with the US and Germany
Splendor	Gregg Araki	Kathleen Robertson, Johnathon Schaech	Comedy	Co-production with the United States
Tea with Mussolini	Franco Zeffirelli	Joan Plowright, Cher, Judi Dench	Drama	
This Year's Love	David Kane	Dougray Scott, Jennifer Ehle, Ian Hart	Comedy	
Titus	Julie Taymor	Anthony Hopkins, Jessica Lange, Alan Cumming	Shakespearean	
To Walk with Lions	Carl Schultz	Richard Harris, John Michie	Adventure	
Tom's Midnight Garden	Willard Carroll	Nigel Le Vaillant, Marlene Sidaway	Fantasy	
Topsy-Turvy	Mike Leigh	Jim Broadbent, Allan Corduner	Dramatic biography	
The Trench	William Boyd	Paul Nicholls, Tam Williams, Daniel Craig	World War I	
Tube Tales	Stephen Hopkins, Charles McDougall and others	Ray Winstone, Liz Smith	Dramatic anthology	
Virtual Sexuality	Nick Hurran	Laura Fraser, Rupert Penry-Jones, Kieran O'Brien	Comedy	
The War Zone	Tim Roth	Ray Winstone, Lara Belmont	Drama	
Whatever Happened to Harold Smith?	Peter Hewitt	Tom Courtenay, Michael Legge, Laura Fraser	Comedy	
The Winslow Boy	David Mamet	Nigel Hawthorne, Rebecca Pidgeon, Jeremy Northam, Gemma Jones	Drama	Previously filmed in 1949, screened at Cannes
With or Without You	Michael Winterbottom	Christopher Eccleston, Dervla Kirwan	Drama	
Wonderland	Michael Winterbottom	Shirley Henderson, Gina McKee, Molly Parker	Drama	Entered into the 1999 Cannes Film Festival
The World Is Not Enough	Michael Apted	Pierce Brosnan, Sophie Marceau, Robert Carlyle	Spy action	
You're Dead	Andy Hurst	John Hurt, Rhys Ifans, Claire Skinner	Crime comedy	Co-production with Germany

== See also ==
- 1999 in film
- 1999 in British music
- 1999 in British radio
- 1999 in British television
- 1999 in the United Kingdom
- List of 1999 box office number-one films in the United Kingdom
