= 1999 in the United Kingdom =

Events from the year 1999 in the United Kingdom. This year is noted for the first meetings of the new Scottish Parliament and National Assembly for Wales.

== Incumbents ==
- Monarch – Elizabeth II
- Prime Minister – Tony Blair (Labour)

== Events ==
=== January ===
- January – Vauxhall launches a facelifted Vectra to improve its disappointing ride and build quality.
- 1 January – The Euro currency is launched, but Britain's Labour government reportedly has no plans to introduce the currency here, preferring to stick to pound sterling instead.
- 13 January – Unemployment has fallen to just over 1,300,000 – the lowest for 20 years.
- 30 January – England national football team manager Glenn Hoddle gives an interview to The Times newspaper in which he suggests that people born with disabilities are paying for sins in a previous life.

=== February ===
- 2 February – The Football Association dismisses Glenn Hoddle as England manager due to the controversy sparked by his comments about disabled people.
- 12 February – Scientists at the Rowett Research Institute in Aberdeen reinforce warnings that genetically modified food may be damaging to the human body.
- 22 February – Harold Shipman, the Hyde GP accused of murdering eight female patients last September, is charged with a further seven murders.
- 24 February – The report of the murder of black London teenager Stephen Lawrence, who was stabbed to death in 1993, condemns London's police force as "institutionally racist", as well as condemning its officers for "fundamental errors".

=== March ===
- 2 March – Singer Dusty Springfield, who received an OBE last month, dies aged 59 at Henley-on-Thames after five years of treatment for breast cancer.
- 7 March – American-born film director Stanley Kubrick dies at his home in St Albans, Hertfordshire, of a heart attack aged 70, five days after completing his final film Eyes Wide Shut, which is released in July.
- 16 March – The NSPCC launches its new "full stop" advertising campaign, which depicts different objects of childhood heroes shielding their eyes as voices were heard being abused. Broadcast after the 9.00pm watershed, this advertisement is part of the largest campaign ever undertaken by a charity and the beginning of a long-term strategy to end violence against children.
- 17 March – Comedian and entertainer Rod Hull is accidentally killed in a fall aged 63 outside his home in Winchelsea, Sussex, after trying to adjust his television aerial.
- 21 March – Comedian Ernie Wise, who formed one-half of the Morecambe and Wise comedy double from 1941 to 1984, dies of a heart attack aged 73 at Wexham, Buckinghamshire.
- 24 March – Ross Kemp, who has achieved TV stardom with his role as Grant Mitchell in EastEnders, signs a £1million deal with ITV, meaning that he will leave EastEnders this autumn after nearly 10 years.
- 26 March – A total £2 billion in compensation is paid to 100,000 former miners who are suffering from lung disease after years of working in British coalfields.
- 29 March – The family of James Hanratty, one of the last men to be executed in Britain (for the A6 murder 37 years ago), are given the right to appeal against his conviction by the Criminal Cases Review Commission.

=== April ===
- April – Vauxhall launches its Zafira, a compact MPV which makes use of the Astra hatchback's chassis.
- 1 April
  - A minimum wage is introduced throughout the UK – set at £3.60 an hour for workers over 21, and £3 for workers under 21.
  - Anthony Sawoniuk, 78, becomes the first person convicted of Second World War crimes in a British court when he is sentenced to life imprisonment for the murder of 18 Jews in his native Belarus. He has lived in Britain since 1947.
- 14 April – Edgar Pearce, the so-called "Mardi Gra bomber", convicted for a series of bombings and sentenced to 21 years in jail.
- 17 April – A bomb explodes in Brixton, South West London, and injures 45 people.
- 24 April – A second bomb explosion in Brick Lane, east London injures 13 people.
- 26 April – TV presenter Jill Dando, 37, dies after being shot on the doorstep of her Fulham home.
- 30 April – A third bomb in London explodes in the Admiral Duncan pub, in Old Compton Street, Soho, London – the centre of the London gay scene – killing two people (including a pregnant woman) and injuring over thirty. David Copeland, a 23-year-old Farnborough man, is arrested hours later in connection with the three explosions.

=== May ===
- 1 May – Andrew Motion's appointment as Poet Laureate in succession to Ted Hughes is announced.
- 3 May – David Copeland appears in court charged with the recent bombings in London.
- 6 May
  - 1999 Scottish Parliament election – The first elections to the Scottish Parliament.
  - 1999 National Assembly for Wales election – The first elections to the Welsh Assembly.
- 7 May – The Labour Party and the Liberal Democrats form a coalition government in Scotland, with Donald Dewar as the First Minister of Scotland.
- 12 May – The Scottish Parliament meets in Edinburgh for its first session. The National Assembly for Wales holds its first session on the same day
- 19 May – Probably the last colliery horse to work underground in a British coal mine is retired, 'Robbie' at Pant y Gasseg drift mine, near Pontypool.
- 21 May – Jill Dando is buried in her hometown of Weston-super-Mare.
- 26 May – Manchester United come from behind to beat Bayern Munich, with two late goals in the UEFA Champions League final in Camp Nou, Barcelona. They are the first English club in history to win the Treble of Premier League, FA Cup and European Cup.
- 26 May – The National Assembly for Wales is officially opened in Cardiff by Queen Elizabeth II.
- 31 May – The Princess Royal opens the new Midland Metro tram service in the West Midlands, which runs on a 15-mile route mostly consisting of former railway lines between Birmingham and Wolverhampton.

=== June ===
- 8 June – Former cabinet minister Jonathan Aitken is sentenced to 18 months prison for perjury.
- 10 June – The European parliament elections are held. The Conservatives enjoy their best performance in any election since the 1992 general election by gaining 36 seats compared to Labour's 29 – a stark contrast to the previous European elections five years ago where they had a mere 18 MEP's compared to Labour's 62. At the Leeds Central by-election, Hilary Benn holds the seat for the Labour Party.
- 12 June – The Queen's Birthday Honours are announced. They include a knighthood for the Manchester United manager Alex Ferguson and the ITV newsreader Trevor McDonald.
- 14 June – Conservative leader William Hague hails his party's strong European election results as vindication of his party's opposition to the single European currency.
- 16 June – David Sutch, the founder of the Official Monster Raving Loony Party, is found hanged at his home in Harrow. He was 58.
- 17 June – Cardinal Basil Hume, leader of the Roman Catholic Church in England and Wales, dies of cancer aged 76 barely two months after the illness was diagnosed.
- 18 June – Police clash with protesters at a demonstration against capitalism in London.
- 19 June – The wedding of Prince Edward and Sophie Rhys-Jones takes place at St George's Chapel, Windsor. Prior to the marriage, the Queen creates Prince Edward, her third and youngest son, Earl of Wessex and Viscount Severn.
- 22 June – Patrick Magee is released from prison under the Good Friday Agreement, 14 years into his life sentence for the Provisional Irish Republican Army bombing at the Grand Hotel in Brighton, which killed five people during the Conservative Party conference on 12 October 1984.
- 23 June
  - Fears about the future of the Rover Group's Longbridge plant in Birmingham are calmed by the news that owner BMW is to invest £2.5billion in the plant.
  - Construction of the Millennium Dome is finished.
- 26 June – The Millennium Stadium, national sports stadium for Wales, is opened in Cardiff.
- 30 June – Manchester United announce that they will not compete in the FA Cup in the forthcoming football season so they can concentrate on their participation in the 2000 FIFA Club World Championship in Brazil at the start of the next year. Their decision is seen as a major boost to England's hopes of hosting the 2006 World Cup.

=== July ===
- 1 July
  - The Scottish Parliament is officially opened by Queen Elizabeth II of the United Kingdom on the day that devolved powers are officially transferred from the Scottish Office in London to the new devolved Scottish Executive in Edinburgh.
  - William Whitelaw, deputy prime minister under Margaret Thatcher, dies at the age of 81 in Penrith.
- 4 July – Rogue trader Nick Leeson returns home to England from Singapore, nearly four years after he was jailed there after his illegal dealings led to the collapse of Barings Bank with losses of £850million.
- 5 July – Chelsea pay a club record of £10million (one of the highest fees paid by any English club) for the Blackburn Rovers striker Chris Sutton.
- 9 July – Neil Kinnock, who was Labour Party leader from 1983 to 1992 while they were in opposition, is appointed vice-president of the European Commission.
- 22 July – At the Eddisbury by-election, Stephen O'Brien holds the seat for the Conservative Party.
- 25 July – 1999 British cabinet reshuffle.

=== August ===
- 4 August
  - George Robertson appointed as Secretary General of NATO.
  - The JJB Stadium opens in Wigan, to serve the town's football and rugby teams.
- 9 August – Charles Kennedy elected as Leader of the Liberal Democrats.
- 11 August – The solar eclipse attracts the attention of 350,000,000 people across Europe, with Cornwall being the only region of Britain to experience totality.
- 20 August – A MORI poll shows Labour support at 49%, giving them a 22-point lead over the Conservatives. However, it is the first time since their election win over two years ago that they have polled at less than 50% in the poll by the leading market research company.
- 22 August – Norfolk farmer Tony Martin, 54, is charged with the murder of a sixteen-year-old burglar who was shot dead at his farm two days ago. He is also charged with wounding a 29-year-old man who was also present at the time of the burglary.

=== September ===
- September
  - Rover launches the 25 and 45. Nissan launches a facelifted Primera to be built by Nissan Motor Manufacturing UK.
  - Meningococcal vaccine against meningitis for young people begins rollout.
- 9 September – Chris Patten's report recommends reform of Royal Ulster Constabulary.
- 23 September – At the Hamilton South by-election, Bill Tynan holds the seat for the Labour Party.
- 23 September – At the Wigan by-election, Neil Turner holds the seat for the Labour Party.
- 24 September – The Royal Bank of Scotland launches a hostile takeover bid for the NatWest Bank.
- 27 September – The Midland Bank adopts the name of its owner HSBC, marking an end of the Midland Bank name after 163 years.
- 27 September – The Kosovo Train for Life aid train arrives in Kosovo after 4,500-kilometre journey from the United Kingdom

=== October ===
- October – The government distributes to all households a booklet concerning the Year 2000 problem, What everyone should know about the Millennium Bug.
- 1 October – The Rugby World Cup begins in the Millennium Stadium, Cardiff.
- 5 October
  - The Ladbroke Grove rail crash claims the lives of 31 people when two trains collide at Ladbroke Grove Junction, 2 miles west of Paddington station, London. Many more people are treated in hospital for injuries.
  - Harold Shipman goes on trial at Preston Crown Court accused of murdering 15 elderly female patients who died in the Greater Manchester area between 1995 and 1998.
- 10 October – The London Eye begins to be lifted into position on the South Bank in London.
- 16 October – 26 players are sent off in Premier League and Football League matches on the same day – the most dismissals on the same day in 111 years of league football in England.
- 19 October – Tracey Emin exhibits My Bed at the Tate Gallery as one of the shortlisted works for the Turner Prize.
- 20 October – Sales of Rover cars are reported to have fallen by 30% this year.

=== November ===
- 2 November – Ford Motor Company takes over Jaguar in a £1.6billion deal.
- 11 November – House of Lords Act 1999 removes most hereditary peers from the House of Lords. Those no longer sitting in the Lords are now eligible to vote in elections for the House of Commons and to sit on juries.
- 12 November – Former glam rock singer Gary Glitter, 54, is jailed for four months at Bristol Crown Court for downloading child pornography. He is cleared at this hearing of having unlawful sex with a teenage fan 20 years ago, but will subsequently be charged in several countries for sexual offences involving minors, culminating in 2015 with a 16-year sentence imposed in the UK.
- 17 November – England qualify for the UEFA Euro 2000 football championship with a 2–1 aggregate win over Scotland in the qualifying playoff round.
- 25 November – At the Kensington and Chelsea by-election, Michael Portillo holds the seat for the Conservative Party.
- 30 November – BAE Systems formed by merger of British Aerospace and Marconi Electronic Systems.

=== December ===
- 10 December – Launch of the European Space Agency's XMM-Newton satellite. Information from the satellite is processed at the University of Leicester.
- 30 December – Former Beatle George Harrison, 56, suffers stab wounds after being attacked by an intruder at Friar Park, his mansion near Henley-on-Thames in Oxfordshire.
- 31 December – Millennium celebrations are held across the country including the official opening of the Millennium Dome and the unveiling of the London Eye in London.

=== Undated ===
- Main construction work on Cardiff Bay Barrage completed.
- More than 20% of the UK population (over 12 million people) now have internet access.

== Publications ==
- Iain Banks' novel The Business.
- Lauren Child's children's book Clarice Bean, That's Me, first in the Clarice Bean series.
- Julia Donaldson's children's book The Gruffalo.
- Jamie Oliver's television tie-in cookbook The Naked Chef.
- Terry Pratchett's Discworld novel The Fifth Elephant.
- J. K. Rowling's children's fantasy novel Harry Potter and the Prisoner of Azkaban.

== Births ==
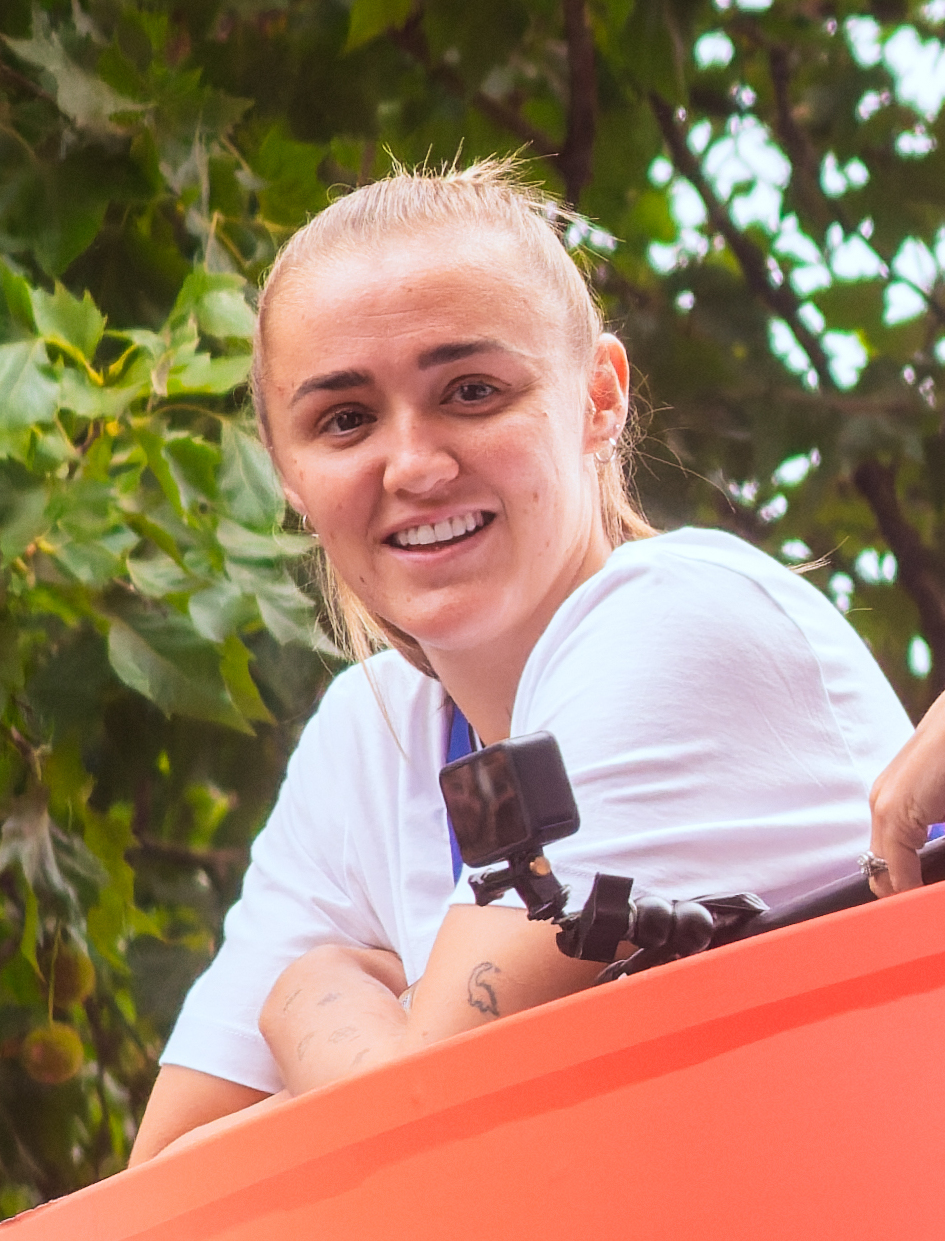
Georgia Stanway

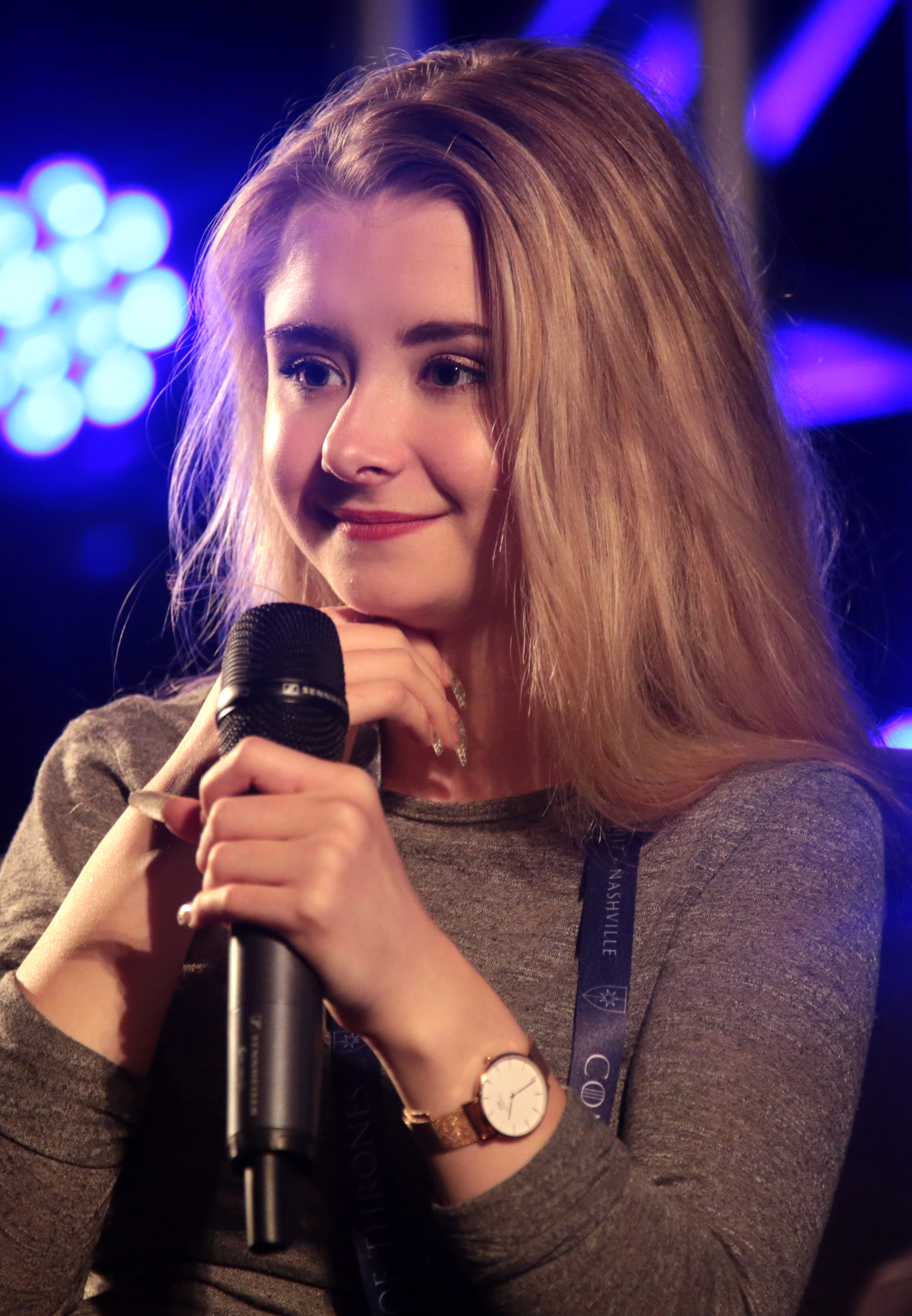
Kerry Ingram

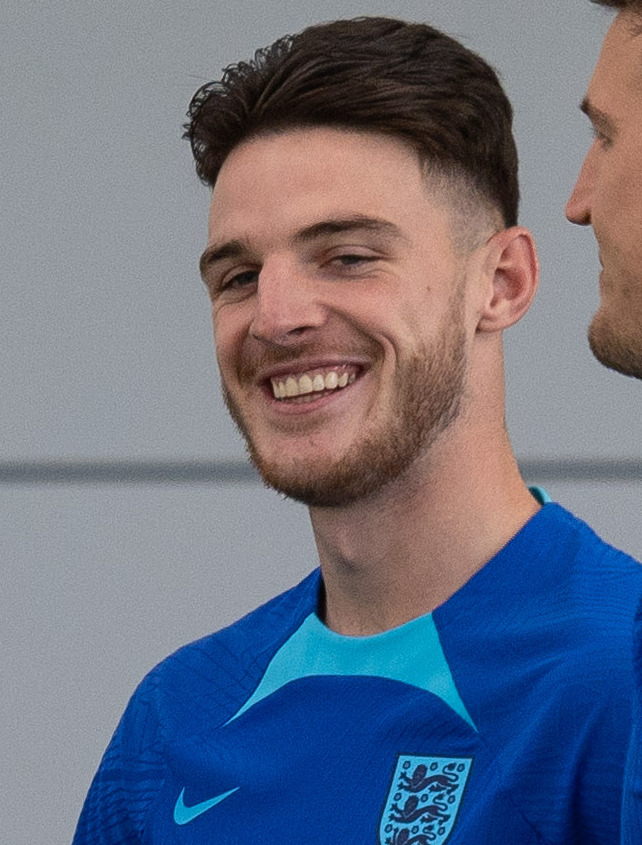
Declan Rice

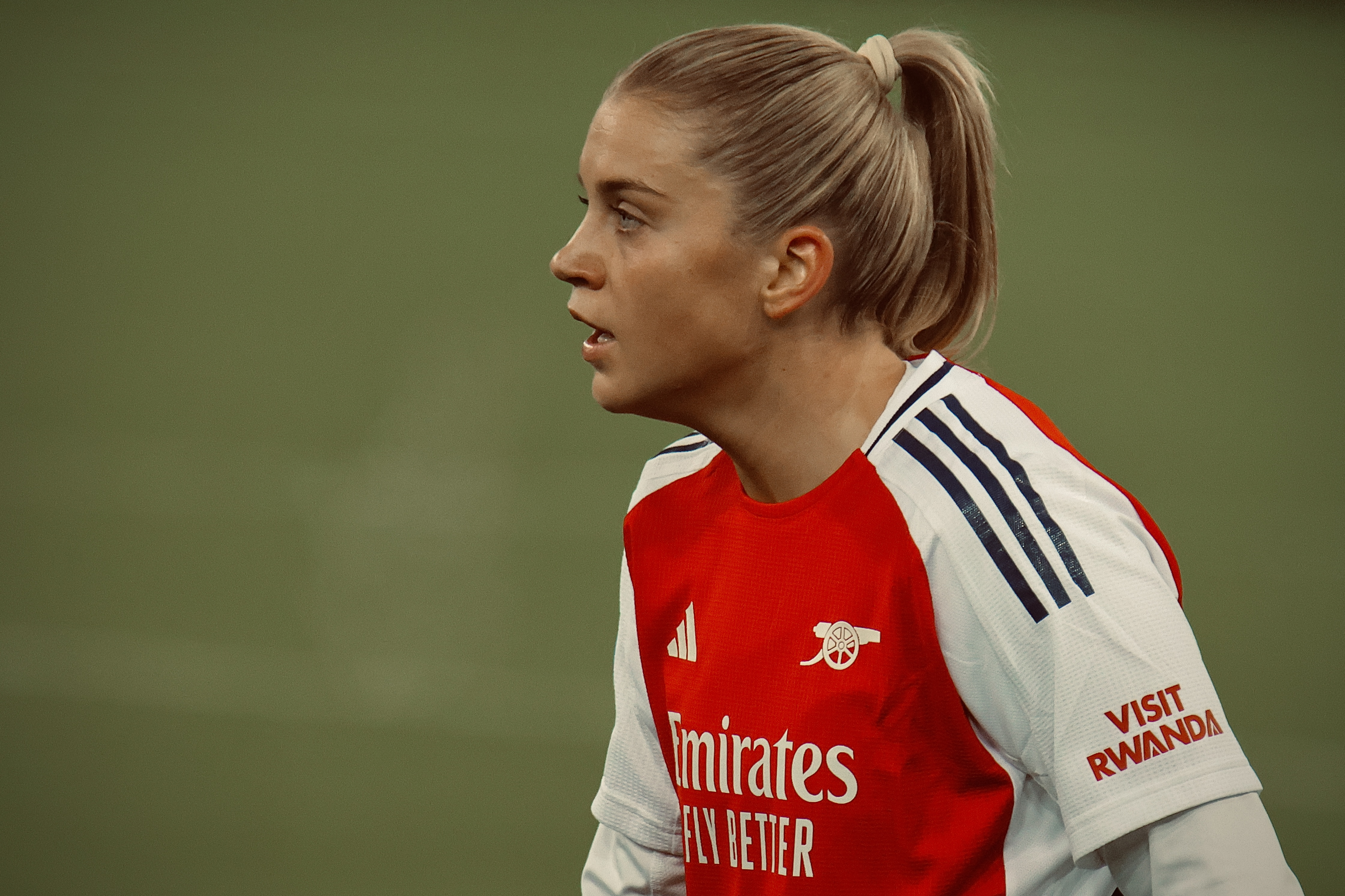
Alessia Russo

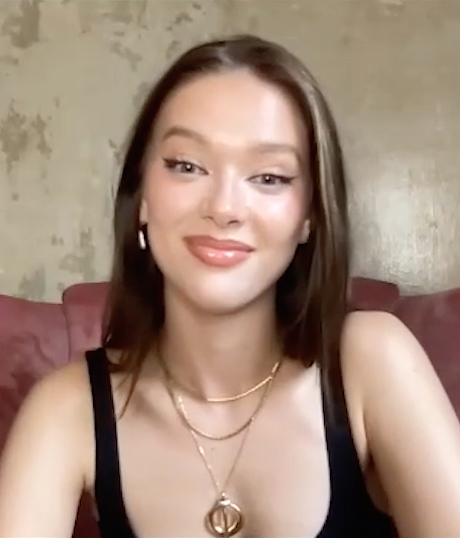
Jessica Alexander

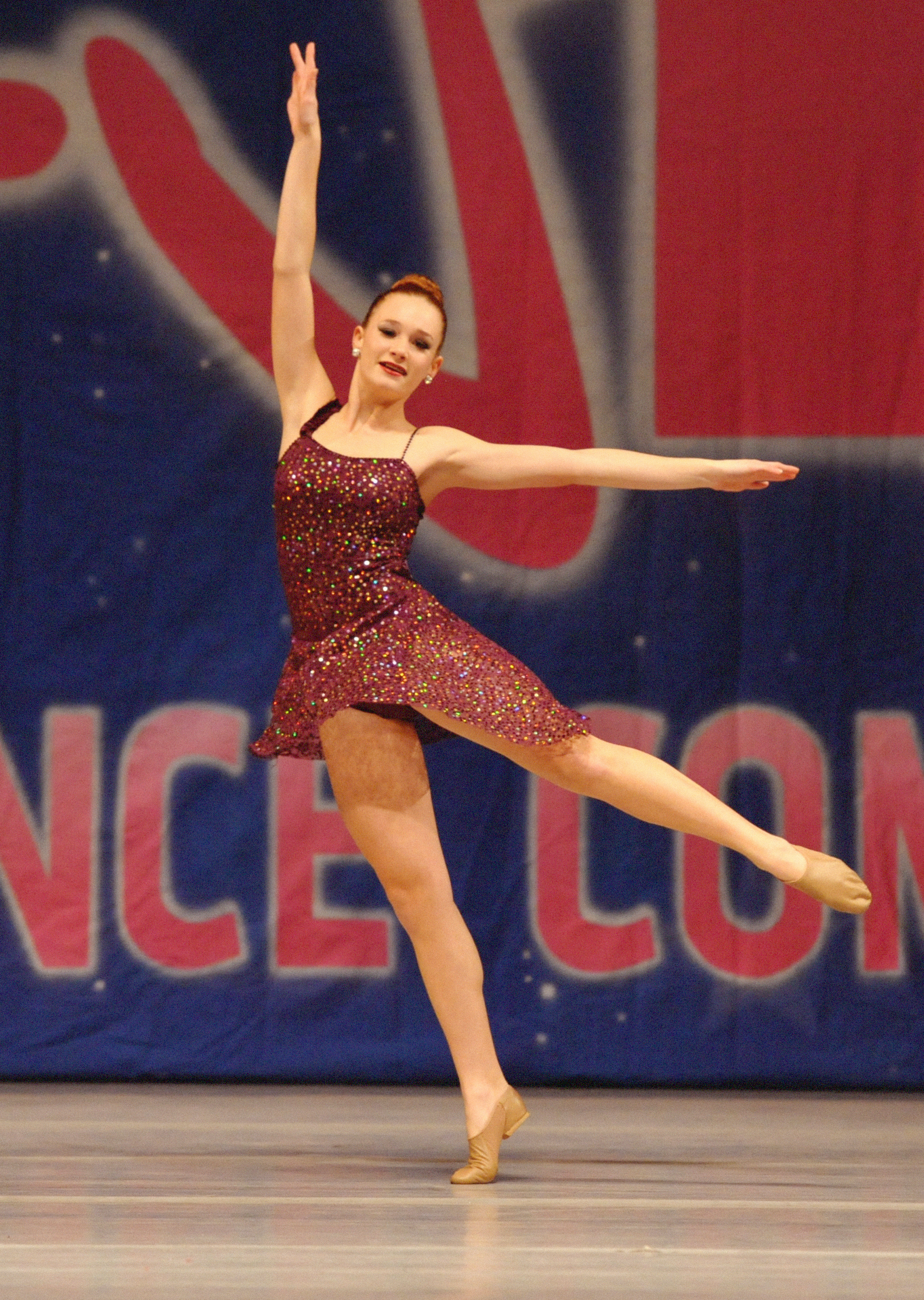
Ellie Darcey-Alden

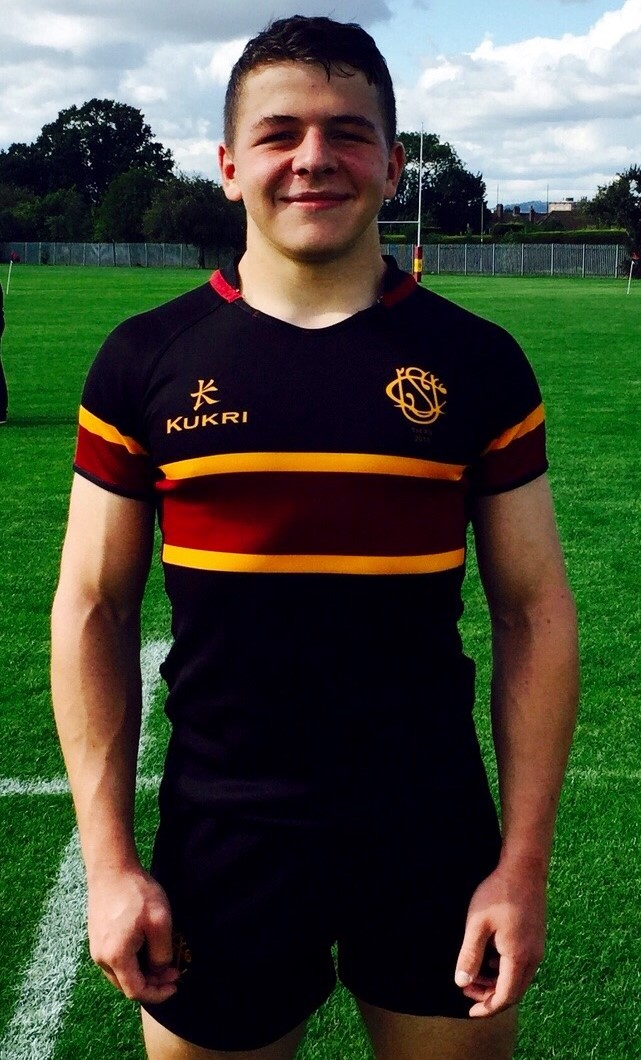
Daniel Roche

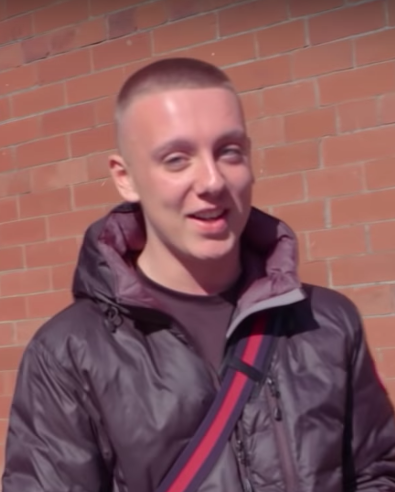
Aitch

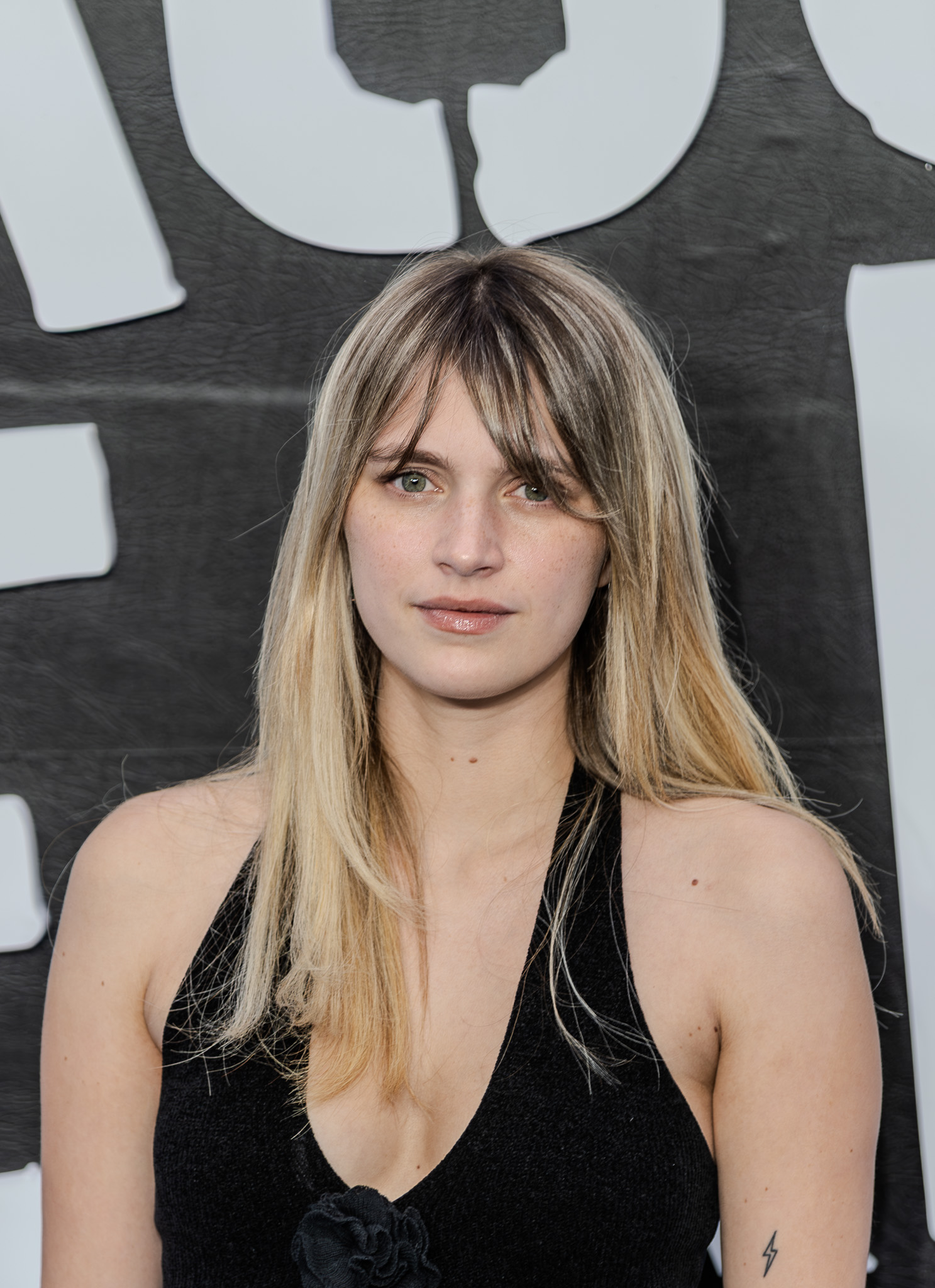
Nell Tiger Free

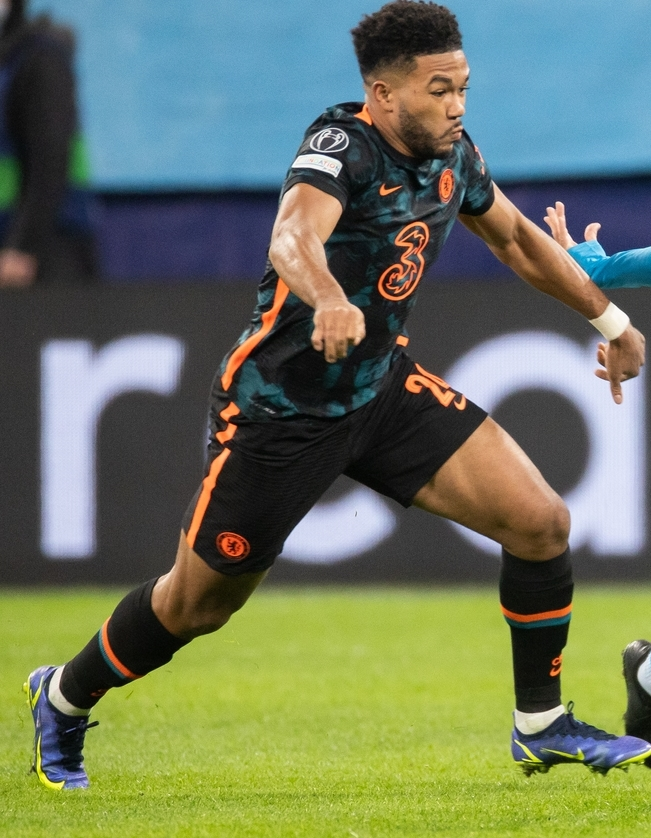
Reece James

- 2 January
  - Dennis Adeniran, footballer
  - Aidan Wilson, footballer
- 3 January – Georgia Stanway
- 10 January – Mason Mount, footballer
- 14 January – Declan Rice, English footballer
- 20 January – Flynn Downes, footballer
- 24 January – Jamie Barjonas, footballer
- 31 January – Alice Tai, swimmer
- 2 February – Marcus McGuane, footballer
- 5 February – Arthur Chatto, son of Lady Sarah Chatto and Daniel Chatto
- 8 February
  - Morgan Feeney, footballer
  - Alessia Russo, footballer
- 9 February – Adrianna Bertola, actress
- 15 February – George Hirst, footballer
- 19 February – Georgia Coates, swimmer
- 22 February – Harry Brook, cricketer
- 1 March – Ryan Porteous, footballer
- 4 March – Brooklyn Beckham, footballer
- 14 March – Olivia Dean, singer
- 22 March – Marcus Tavernier, footballer
- 4 April – Sheku Kanneh-Mason, cellist
- 12 April – Akai Osei, street dancer
- 18 April
  - Ben Brereton, footballer
  - Liam Trevaskis, cricketer
- 19 April – Beth Shriever, BMX racer
- 24 April – Jonathan Leko, footballer
- 2 May – Andre Dozzell, footballer
- 6 May – Sophie Ecclestone, cricketer
- 7 May
  - Tommy Fury, boxer and TV personality
  - Fraser Murray, footballer
- 22 May – Josh Tymon, footballer
- 26 May
  - Molly-Mae Hague, social media personality
  - Kerry Ingram, actress
- 30 May – Eddie Nketiah, footballer
- 2 June – Felix Organ, Australian-born English cricketer
- 3 June – Liam Banks, cricketer
- 19 June – Jessica Alexander
- 23 June – Noah Marullo, actor
- 29 June – Tom Sang, Malaysian footballer
- 5 July – Phil Hanson, racing driver
- 14 July – Scott Twine, footballer
- 20 July – Ellie Downie, gymnast
- 20 August – Joe Willock, footballer
- 21 August – Henry Brookes, cricketer
- 24 August – Lewis Ferguson, footballer
- 27 August – Jack Plom, cricketer
- 28 August – Kyle Taylor, footballer
- 4 September – Ellie Darcey-Alden, actress
- 13 September – Fraser Hornby, footballer
- 13 October – Nell Tiger Free, actress
- 14 October – Daniel Roche, actor
- 15 October – Ben Woodburn, footballer
- 20 October – Connor Marsh, actor
- 24 October – Dujon Sterling, footballer
- 4 November – Ben Wilmot, footballer
- 6 November – Tristan Nydam, footballer
- 13 November – Lando Norris, racing driver
- 14 November
  - Ellis Hollins, actor
  - Jude Wright, actor
- 4 December – Aitch, rapper
- 8 December – Reece James, footballer
- 10 December – Reiss Nelson, footballer
- Undated – Freya Wilson, actress

== Deaths ==
=== January ===
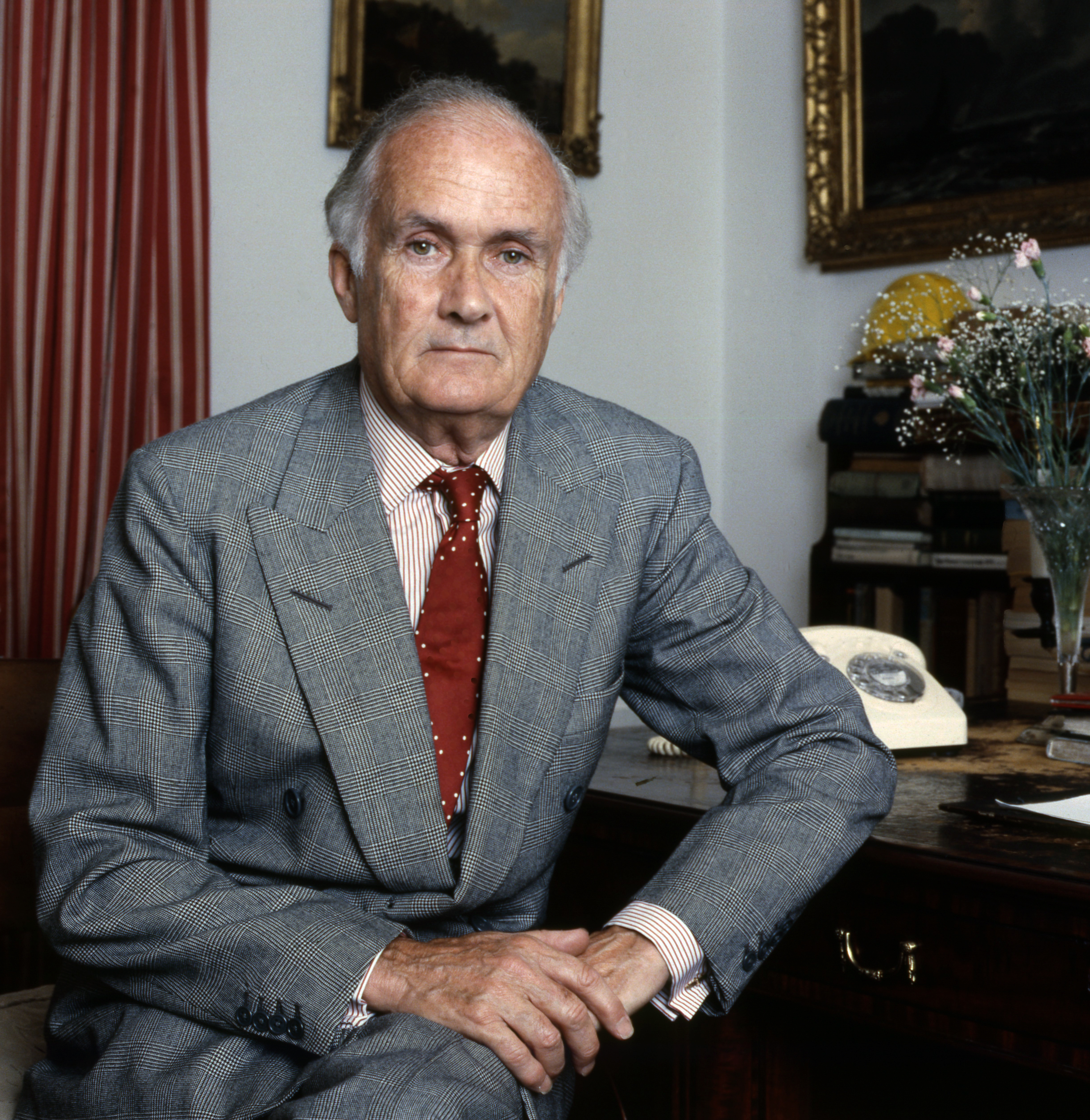
Charles Manners, 10th Duke of Rutland

- 4 January – Charles Manners, 10th Duke of Rutland, peer (born 1919)
- 6 January – Henrietta Moraes, artists' model and memoirist (born 1931)
- 9 January – Jim Peters, long-distance runner (born 1918)
- 10 January – John Hervey, 7th Marquess of Bristol, peer and businessman (born 1954)
- 11 January – Naomi Mitchison, Scottish novelist and poet (born 1897)
- 14 January
  - Robin Bailey, actor (born 1919)
  - Muslimgauze, electronic musician (born 1961)
- 15 January
  - Betty Box, film producer (born 1915)
  - Marion Ryan, singer (born 1931)
- 16 January – Dadie Rylands, literary scholar and theatre director (born 1902)
- 20 January – John Golding, politician (born 1931)
- 21 January – Leslie French, actor (born 1904)
- 22 January – Steven Sykes, artist (born 1914)
- 23 January – Terence Lewin, Baron Lewin, Royal Navy admiral, Chief of the Defence Staff in the Falklands War (born 1920)
- 25 January – Philip Mason, civil servant and writer (born 1906)

=== February ===
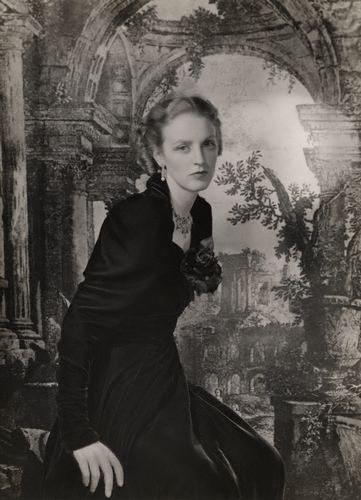
Lady Pansy Lamb

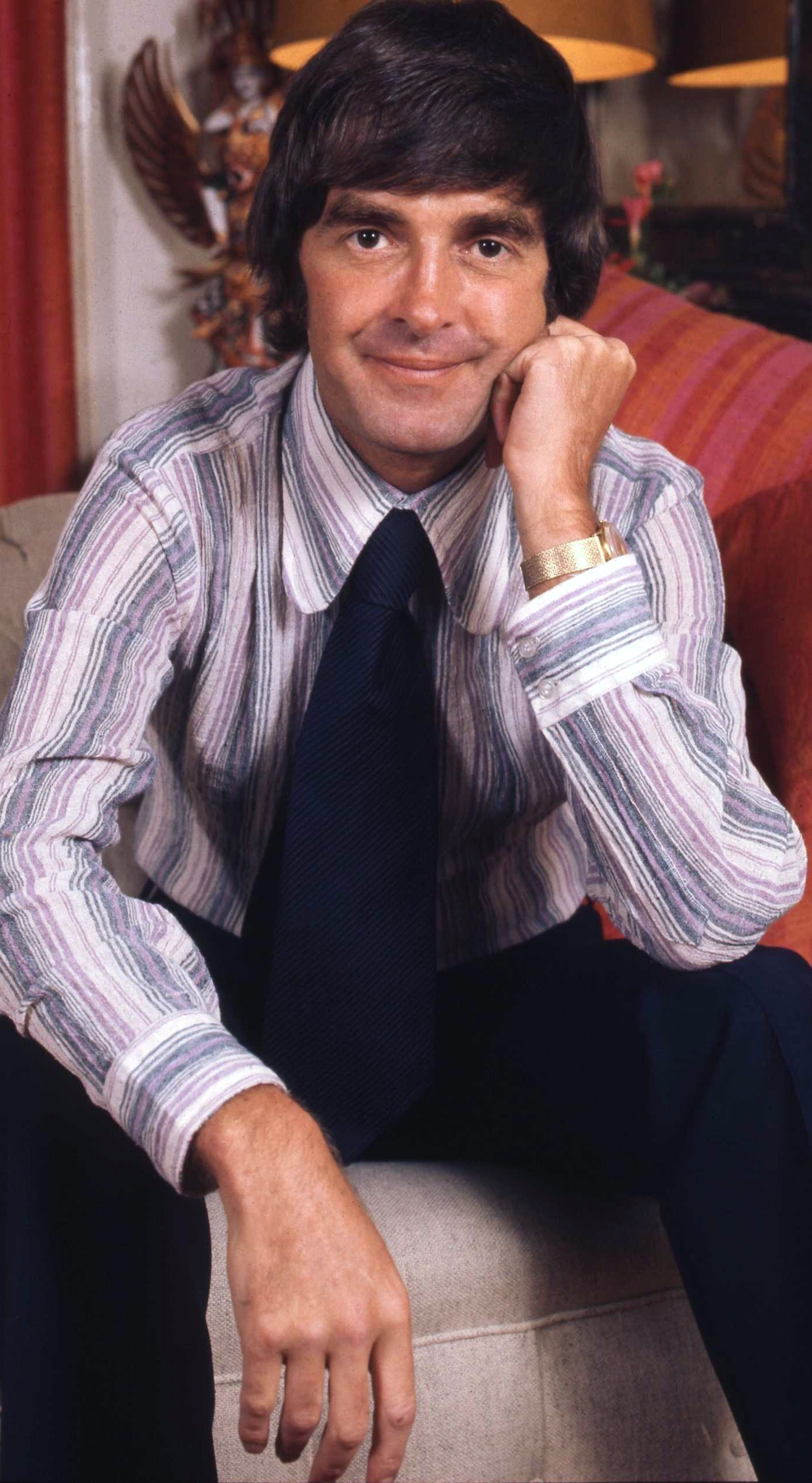
Derek Nimmo

- 3 February
  - Arthur Mann, footballer and coach (born 1945)
  - Alfred Janes, artist (born 1911)
- 7 February – Andrew Keller, scientist (born 1925)
- 8 February
  - Meredith Edwards, actor (born 1917)
  - Iris Murdoch, novelist and philosopher (born 1919)
- 9 February
  - Bryan Mosley, actor (born 1931)
  - Inga-Stina Robson, Baroness Robson of Kiddington, political activist (born 1919, Sweden)
- 10 February – Joan Curran, Welsh physicist (born 1916)
- 11 February – Brian Parsons, cricketer (Surrey) (born 1933)
- 16 February – James Hill, politician (born 1926)
- 17 February – Thomas Carr, Northern Irish artist (born 1909)
- 19 February – Lady Pansy Lamb, writer (born 1904)
- 20 February – Sarah Kane, playwright (born 1971); suicide
- 23 February
  - Stanley Dance, jazz writer and record producer (born 1910)
  - David Chilton Phillips, biologist (born 1924)
- 24 February
  - David Eccles, 1st Viscount Eccles, politician (born 1904)
  - Derek Nimmo, actor (born 1930); accidentally killed
- 28 February
  - Dave Bedwell, racing cyclist (born 1928)
  - Lionel Berry, 2nd Viscount Kemsley, peer and newspaper editor (born 1909)

=== March ===
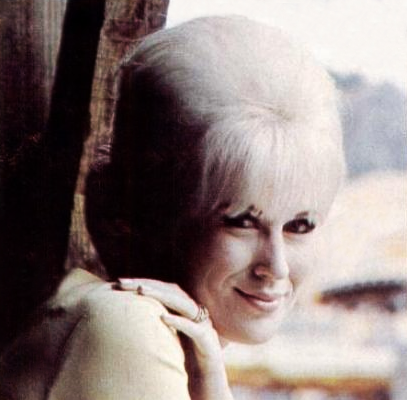
Dusty Springfield

- 1 March – Christine Glanville, puppeteer (born 1924)
- 2 March – Dusty Springfield, singer (born 1939)
- 5 March – Tom Denning, Baron Denning, judge (born 1899)
- 6 March
  - Graham Armitage, actor (born 1936)
  - Dennis Viollet, footballer (born 1933); died in the United States
- 7 March – Stanley Kubrick, film director (born 1928 in the United States)
- 9 March – Arnold Machin, artist, coin and stamp designer (born 1911)
- 10 March – Adrian Love, radio presenter (born 1944)
- 13 March – Emmy Bridgwater, artist and poet (born 1906)
- 15 March – Rosemary Nelson, Northern Irish human rights solicitor (born 1958); murdered
- 17 March – Rod Hull, entertainer (born 1935); accidentally killed
- 20 March – Patrick Heron, artist, critic, writer and polemicist (born 1920)
- 21 March – Ernie Wise, comedian (born 1925)
- 24 March – Henry Brandon, Baron Brandon of Oakbrook, judge (born 1920)
- 27 March – Michael Aris, historian (born 1946)

=== April ===
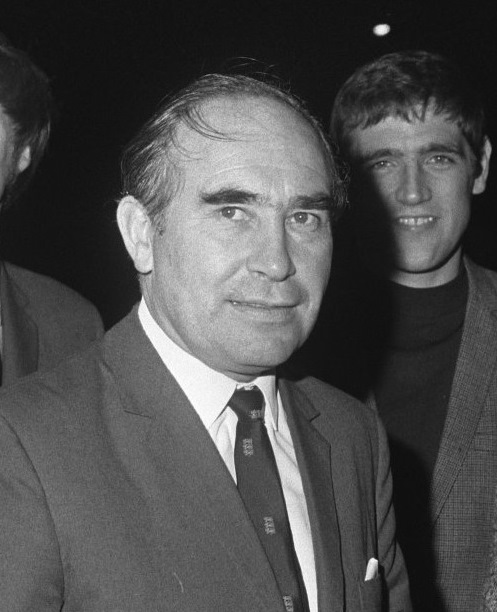
Alf Ramsey

- 2 April – Andrew Gardner, television journalist (born 1932)
- 3 April – Lionel Bart, composer (born 1930)
- 4 April – Bob Peck, actor (born 1945)
- 6 April – William Pleeth, cellist (born 1910)
- 7 April – Angus Paton, civil engineer (born 1905)
- 9 April
  - Bert Firman, musician and band leader (born 1906)
  - Mary Lutyens, author (born 1908)
- 12 April – Alan Evans, darts player (born 1949)
- 14 April – Anthony Newley, actor, singer and songwriter (born 1931)
- 16 April – Margaret Tait, filmmaker and poet (born 1918)
- 17 April – Richard Negri, theatre director and designer (born 1927)
- 21 April – Liz Tilberis, fashion magazine editor (born 1947)
- 25 April
  - Kemistry, drum and bass musician (born 1963); car accident
  - William McCrea, astronomer and mathematician (born 1904)
- 26 April
  - Adrian Borland, singer (The Sound) (born 1957); suicide
  - Jill Dando, journalist and television presenter (born 1961); murdered
- 28 April
  - Sir Alf Ramsey, footballer and manager (born 1920)
  - John Stears, special effects artist (born 1934)
- 29 April – Elspeth March, actress (born 1911)

=== May ===
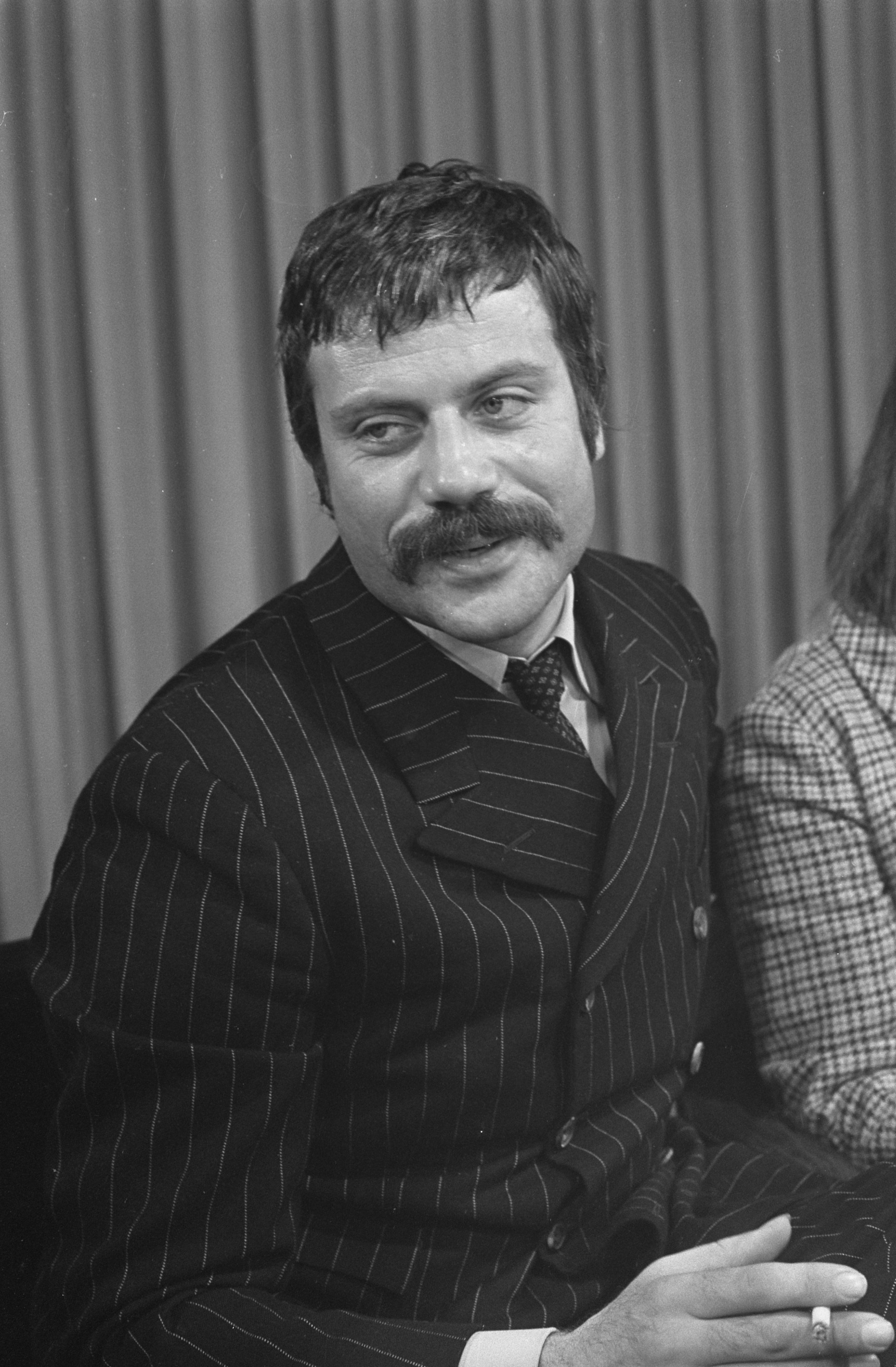
Oliver Reed

- 1 May – Brian Shawe-Taylor, racing driver (born 1915)
- 2 May – Oliver Reed, actor (born 1938)
- 5 May – John Howard, Army officer and D-Day veteran (born 1912)
- 6 May – Johnny Morris, television presenter (born 1916)
- 7 May – Elliot Pinhey, entomologist (born 1910, Belgium)
- 8 May
  - Dirk Bogarde, actor and author (born 1921)
  - Michael Nightingale, actor (born 1922)
- 9 May – Derek Fatchett, politician (born 1945)
- 11 May
  - George Hunter, motorcycle speedway rider (born 1939)
  - Robert Thomas, sculptor (born 1926)
- 13 May – Roy Crowson, biologist (born 1914)
- 18 May – Freddy Randall, jazz trumpeter (born 1921)
- 19 May
  - James Blades, orchestral percussionist (born 1901)
  - Alister Williamson, actor (born 1918)
- 21 May – Norman Rossington, actor (born 1928)
- 30 May – Sonia Chadwick Hawkes, archaeologist (born 1933)

=== June ===
- 1 June – Christopher Cockerell, inventor (born 1910)
- 7 June
  - Lady June, painter, poet and musician (born 1931)
  - Joseph Vandernoot, orchestral conductor (born 1914)
- 8 June – Christina Foyle, bookshop owner (born 1911)
- 13 June – Douglas Seale, actor (born 1913)
- 15 June – Alan Cathcart, 6th Earl Cathcart, Army major-general (born 1919)
- 16 June
  - James Ottaway, actor (born 1908)
  - Lawrence Stone, historian (born 1919)
  - David Sutch ("Screaming Lord Sutch"), musician and founder of the Official Monster Raving Loony Party (born 1940); suicide
- 17 June – Cardinal Basil Hume, Archbishop of Westminster (since 1976) (born 1923)
- 18 June – Ross Baillie, athlete (born 1977)
- 23 June – Buster Merryfield, actor (born 1920)
- 24 June – Geoff Lawson, car designer (born 1944)
- 25 June – Fred Feast, actor (born 1929)
- 27 June – Alfred Robens, Baron Robens of Woldingham, trade unionist and politician (born 1910)
- 29 June – Declan Mulholland, Northern Irish actor (born 1932)
- 30 June – Sir Clifford Charles Butler, physicist, discoverer of the hyperon and meson types of particles (born 1922)

=== July ===
- 1 July – William Whitelaw, 1st Viscount Whitelaw, politician (born 1918)
- 4 July – Jack Watson, actor (born 1915)
- 5 July – Joan Kemp-Welch, actress (born 1906)
- 9 July – Esme Mackinnon, Alpine skier (born 1913)
- 10 July – John Scott-Ellis, 9th Baron Howard de Walden, peer (born 1912)
- 12 July
  - Alex Gordon, architect (born 1917)
  - Bill Owen, actor (born 1914)
- 15 July – Simon Ramsay, 16th Earl of Dalhousie, Scottish peer (born 1914)
- 19 July – Jerold Wells, actor (born 1908)
- 21 July
  - Peter Carter, author of children's books (born 1929)
  - David Ogilvy, businessman (born 1911)
- 22 July – Mary Kerridge, actress and theatre director (born 1914)
- 26 July
  - Philippa Gail, actress (born 1942)
  - John W. N. Watkins, philosopher (born 1924)
- 27 July – Amaryllis Fleming, cellist (born 1925)

=== August ===
- 4 August – Carl Toms, set and costume designer (born 1927)
- 5 August – David Munro, documentary filmmaker (born 1944)
- 9 August
  - Bob Herbert, original manager of the Spice Girls (born 1942); car accident
  - Helen Rollason, television sports presenter (born 1956)
- 10 August – Jennifer Paterson, television chef, one half of the Two Fat Ladies (born 1928)
- 12 August
  - Albert E. Green, applied mathematician (born 1912)
  - John Rigby Hale, historian (born 1923)
- 13 August – John Geering, cartoonist (born 1941)
- 15 August
  - Patricia Beer, poet and critic (born 1919)
  - Hugh Casson, architect, writer and artist (born 1910)
- 19 August – Ian Orr-Ewing, Baron Orr-Ewing, politician (born 1912)
- 20 August – Arthur Cain, biologist and ecologist (born 1921)
- 23 August – James White, science-fiction writer (born 1928)
- 25 August
  - Rob Fisher, songwriter and musician (Naked Eyes, Climie Fisher) (born 1956)
  - George Petty-Fitzmaurice, 8th Marquess of Lansdowne, peer and politician (born 1912)

=== September ===
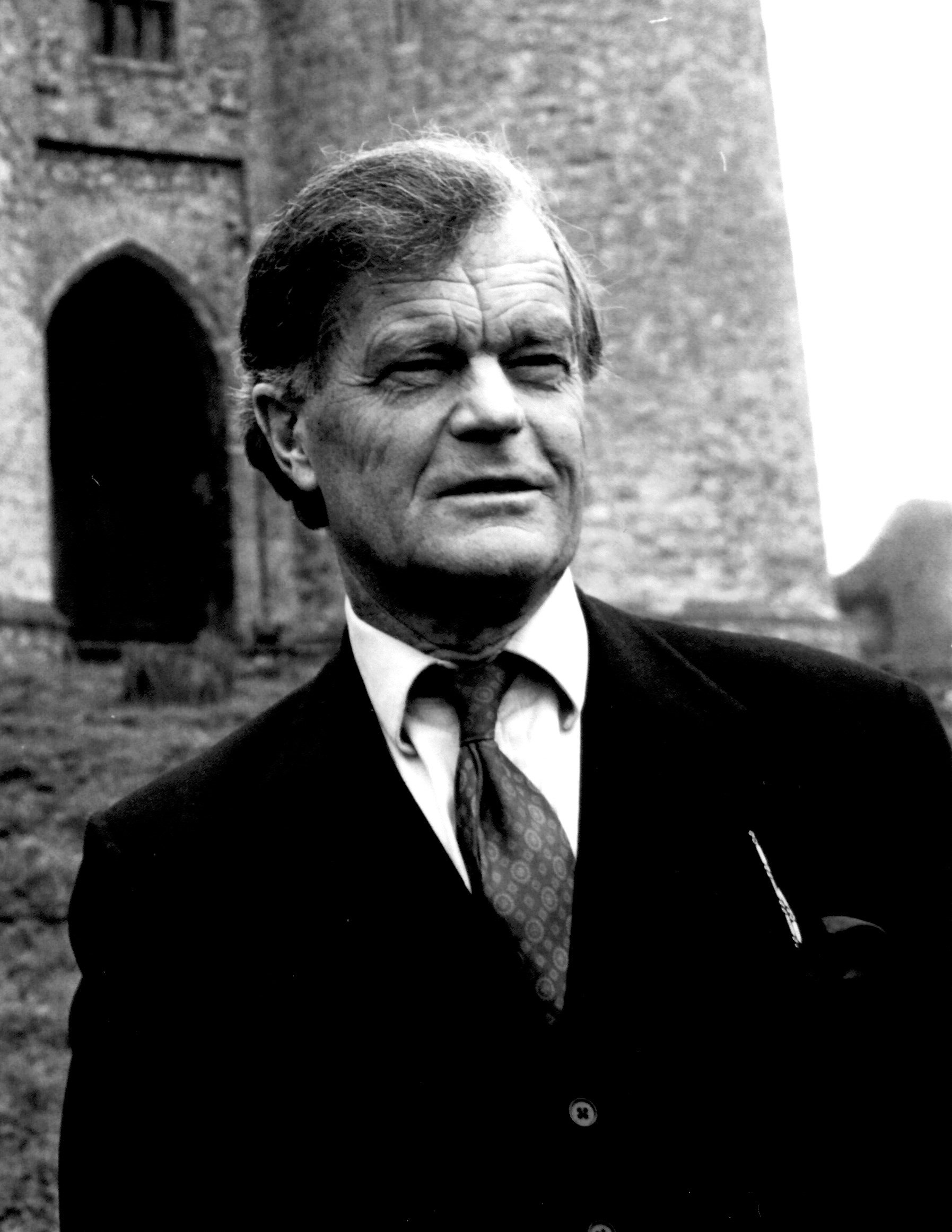
Alan Clark

- 3 September – Paul Lucien Dessau, artist (born 1909)
- 5 September
  - Alan Clark, Conservative Member of Parliament and former government minister (born 1928)
  - Ivor Roberts, actor (born 1925)
- 9 September – Chili Bouchier, actress (born 1909)
- 11 September – Janet Adam Smith, writer and editor (born 1905)
- 14 September – Charles Crichton, film director and film editor (born 1910)
- 15 September
  - Hardiman Scott, journalist (born 1925)
  - Bill Westwood, Anglican prelate, Bishop of Peterborough (1984–1995) (born 1925)
- 17 September
  - Liane Collot d'Herbois, painter (born 1909)
  - Joan Gardner, actress (born 1914)
  - Frankie Vaughan, singer and actor (born 1928)
- 24 September – Rowena Mary Bruce, chess player (born 1919)
- 27 September – Sir Philip Haddon-Cave, colonial administrator (born 1925)
- 30 September – Thomas Holland, Roman Catholic prelate, Bishop of Salford (1964–1983) (born 1908)

=== October ===
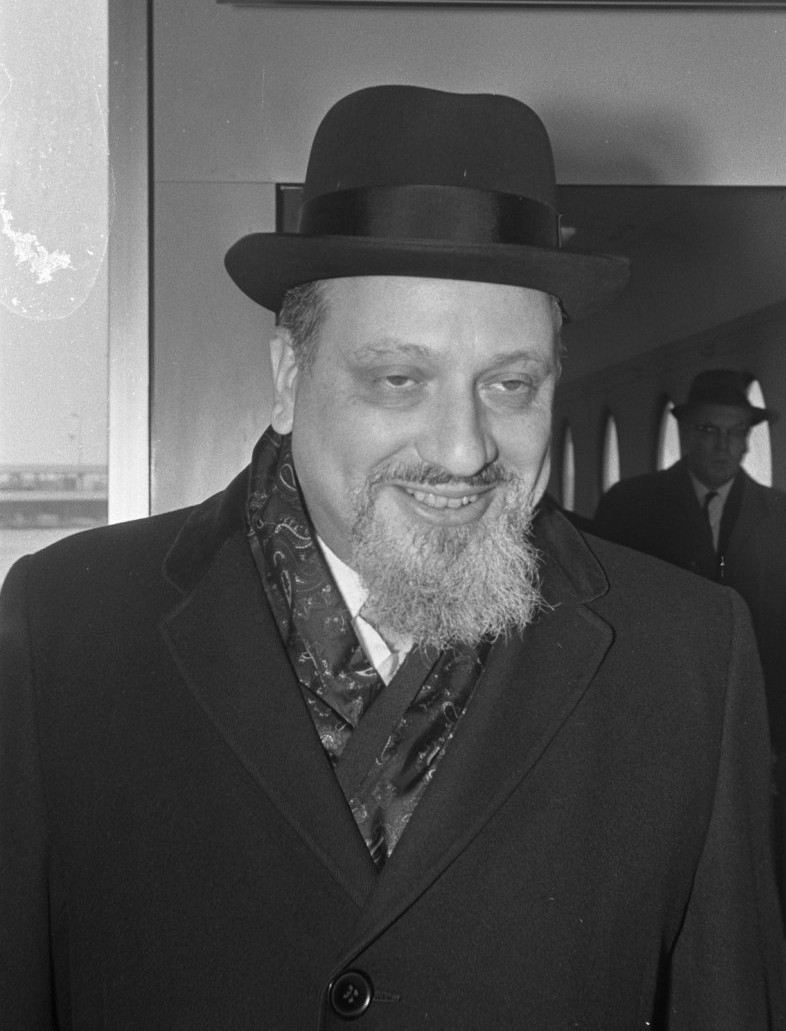
Rabbi Immanuel Jakobovits

- 1 October – Noel Johnson, actor (born 1916)
- 3 October – Alastair Hetherington, journalist, editor of The Guardian (1953–1975) (born 1919)
- 6 October – Patrick Reilly, diplomat (born 1909)
- 7 October – Deryck Guyler, actor (born 1914)
- 11 October – John Foot, Baron Foot, politician (born 1909)
- 15 October
  - Eddie Jones, artist (born 1935)
  - Josef Locke, tenor (born 1917 in Northern Ireland); died in Ireland
- 18 October – Tony Crombie, jazz musician (born 1925)
- 19 October
  - Sir Robert Black, colonial administrator, Governor of Hong Kong (1958–1964) (born 1906)
  - Penelope Mortimer, journalist, biographer and novelist (born 1918)
  - E. J. Scovell, poet and translator (born 1907)
- 23 October – Bobby Willis, songwriter and husband of Cilla Black (born 1942)
- 27 October – Johnny Byrne, footballer (born 1939)
- 29 October – Colin Matthew, historian and academic (born 1941)
- 31 October – Immanuel Jakobovits, Baron Jakobovits, rabbi (born 1921)

=== November ===
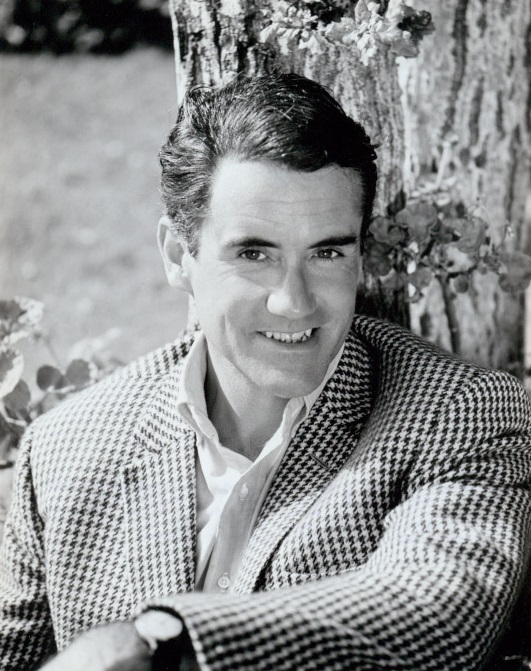
Ian Bannen

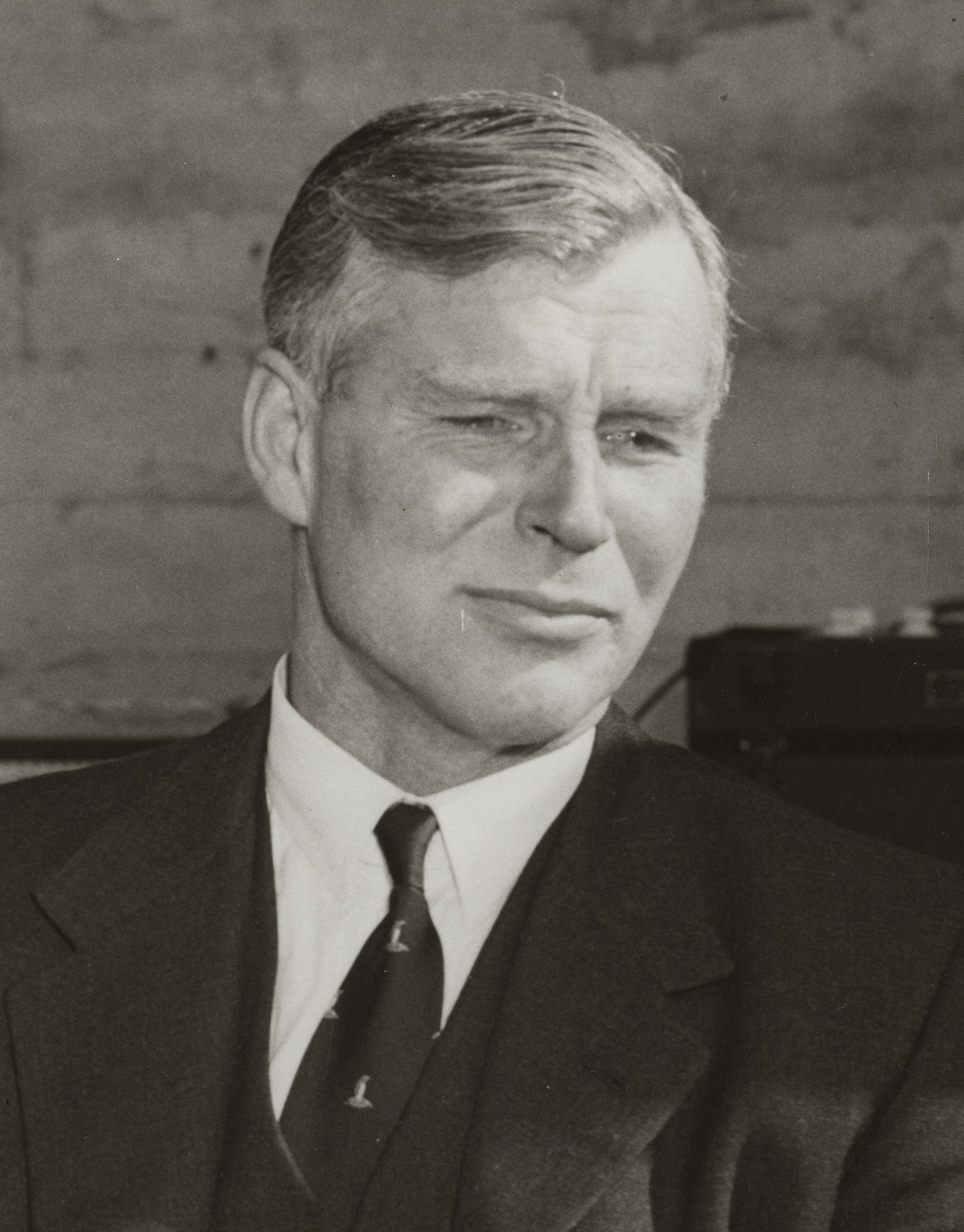
Vivian Fuchs

- 1 November – Edmund Dell, businessman (born 1921)
- 3 November – Ian Bannen, Scottish actor (born 1928); car accident
- 4 November – Charles Wintour, newspaper editor (born 1917)
- 8 November – Jerry Kerr, Scottish footballer (born 1912)
- 10 November – Eric Langton, motorcycle speedway rider (born 1907)
- 11 November
  - Sir Vivian Fuchs, explorer (born 1908)
  - Thomas Pitfield, composer (born 1903)
- 14 November – Minna Keal, composer (born 1909)
- 15 November – Sir Harry Llewellyn, 3rd Baronet, equestrian, Olympic champion (1952) (born 1911)
- 17 November – Edmund Fryde, historian (born 1923, Poland)
- 21 November – Quentin Crisp, writer and raconteur (born 1908)
- 24 November
  - Sarah Gainham, journalist and author (born 1915)
  - David Kessler, publisher and author (born 1906)
  - Hilary Minster, actor (born 1944)
- 26 November – John Skelton, letter-cutter and sculptor (born 1923)

=== December ===
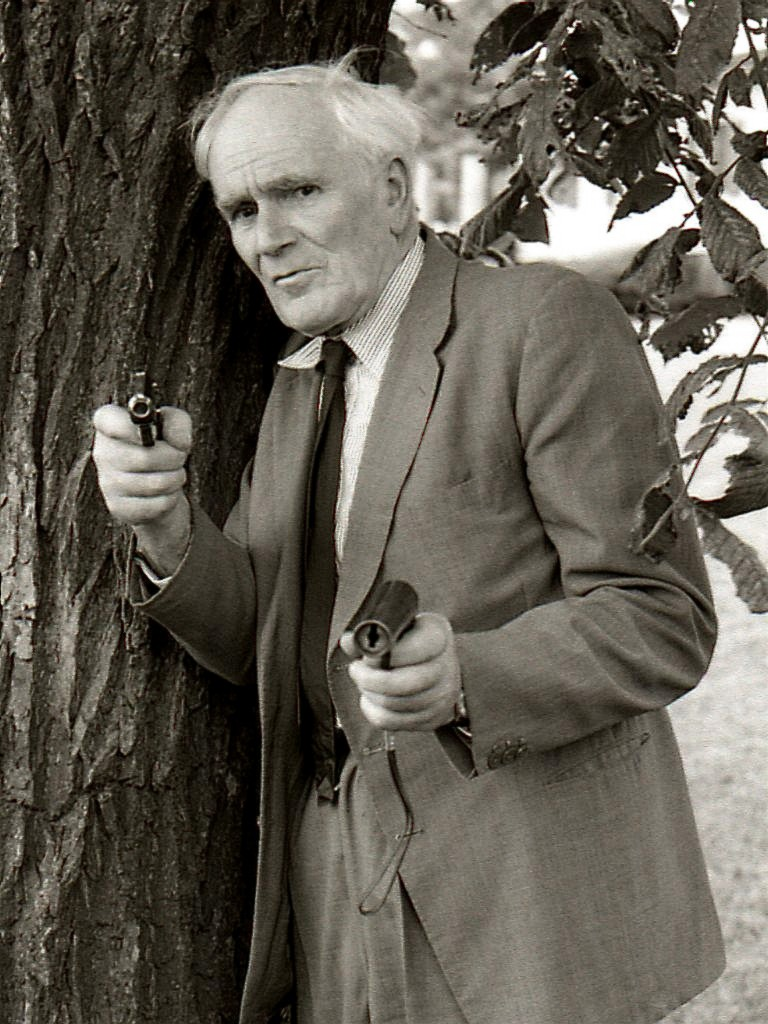
Desmond Llewelyn

- 4 December – Alick Walker, palaeontologist (born 1925)
- 5 December – Kendall Taylor, pianist (born 1905)
- 6 December
  - Alexander Baron, author and screenwriter (born 1917)
  - Gwyn Jones, author (born 1907)
- 7 December – Kenny Baker, jazz trumpeter (born 1921)
- 8 December – Rupert Hart-Davis, publisher (born 1907)
- 9 December – Cecil Williamson, screenwriter, editor and film director (born 1909)
- 10 December – Mike Randall, journalist (born 1919)
- 12 December – John W. R. Taylor, aviation expert (born 1922)
- 13 December
  - Jill Craigie, filmmaker and screenwriter (born 1911)
  - Ian Watt, literary critic (born 1917)
  - Lady Mary Whitley, noblewoman (born 1924)
- 14 December – Sven Berlin, painter, writer and sculptor (born 1911)
- 18 December
  - Dennis W. Sciama, physicist (born 1926)
  - Bertha Swirles, physicist (born 1903)
- 19 December – Desmond Llewelyn, actor (born 1914)
- 21 December – John Arnatt, actor (born 1917)
- 23 December
  - Martin Charteris, Baron Charteris of Amisfield, Army officer and courtier of Queen Elizabeth II (born 1913)
  - Eirene White, Baroness White, politician and journalist (born 1909)
- 25 December – Peter Jeffrey, actor (born 1929)
- 26 December – Prunella Clough, artist (born 1919)
- 31 December – William Hughes, Baron Hughes, politician (born 1911)

== See also ==
- 1999 in British music
- 1999 in British television
- List of British films of 1999
