= Connor Marsh =

English actor

- Born: Connor James Marsh; 20 October 1999 (age 26); Bury, Greater Manchester, England

Connor James Marsh (born 20 October 1999) is a television actor from Bury, Lancashire

He played Lewis Royle, son of Anthony, in the one-off special episode of The Royle Family entitled "The Queen of Sheba" which aired in October 2006. The part was written especially for him and gave him the chance to show off his talent for impressions.

He appeared in an episode of The Innocence Project, which aired on BBC1. He played Daniel Lucas, the son of one of the main characters, Andrew, played by Stephen Graham. Shortly after, he appeared as a main artist in an advertisement for Morrisons supermarket, advertising DVDs for kids on offer over the February half-term holidays.

Marsh secured a guest appearance on the BBC1 afternoon soap opera, Doctors, which aired on 9 August 2007. He played the role of Kevin. He also appeared as an extra in the 2008 British documentary-style comedy The Cup, in which he portrayed one of the footballers in the winning team. This combined two of Connor's favourite pastimes, filming and football.

In 2009, Marsh recorded a government broadcast in London in June which aired on local radio stations around the country from 6 July 2009. The mother in the broadcast is played by Men Behaving Badly actress Caroline Quentin.

Connor will be appearing in episode 2 of the new comedy White Van Man, starring Will Mellor, Clive Mantle and Joanna Page. The episode, "Turf" aired on 22 March on BBC3 at 11pm.

At the beginning of June 2013, Connor took part in the All Saints Amateur Dramatics society production of The Sound Of Music, in which he played the part of "Kurt".

Connor is also a singer and can be heard in local bars singing indie songs.
