= David Blake (composer) =

English composer and founder member

David Blake (born 2 September 1936) is an English composer and founder member of the Department of Music at the University of York.

== Early life and education ==
Blake was born in London. Following national service, he learnt Mandarin Chinese and spent one year in Hong Kong. He went on to read music at Gonville and Caius College, Cambridge, where his teachers were Patrick Hadley, Peter Tranchell and Raymond Leppard. He was awarded the Mendelssohn Scholarship for Composition in 1960, and, uniquely for a British composer of his generation, he went to East Berlin to study with Arnold Schoenberg's pupil, the Marxist composer Hanns Eisler, as a Meisterschüler of the GDR Akademie der Künste (Academy of Arts, Berlin). During this time, he composed the first of his acknowledged compositions – the Variations for Piano and the String Quartet No. 1.

== Career ==
In 1963, he was awarded the Granada Arts Fellowship at the newly opened University of York, and the following year, with Wilfrid Mellers and Peter Aston, he founded the Department of Music there. He was Lecturer in Music in the Department until 1976 and then succeeded Wilfrid Mellers as Professor. His first important commission came in 1966, from the York Festival, for his Chamber Symphony. Subsequent commissions included Lumina (soloists, chorus and large orchestra) for the 1970 Leeds Festival; the Violin Concerto for the 1976 BBC Proms; Toussaint, an opera in three acts for the English National Opera, first produced in 1977 (and revived 1983); Rise Dove (solo bass and orchestra) for the BBC; The Plumber's Gift, an opera in two acts for the English National Opera, first produced in 1989 with libretto by John Birtwhistle; and the Cello Concerto, commissioned by the BBC for the 1993 Cheltenham Festival.

He also went on to found the University of York Music Press – known as UYMP – in 1995 with Bill Colleran, with a purpose to promote new and established composers with a range of aesthetic backgrounds. He retired from the University of York in 2001, but remains on the board of UYMP.

== Selected list of works ==
His extensive output, which includes operas and orchestral works, is published by Chester Novello (to 1994) and by UYMP (after 1994).

=== Operas and stage works ===
- It's a Small War, musical for schools (1962, Oxford University Press)
- Toussaint, opera in 3 acts (1974–77)
- The Plumber's Gift, opera in 2 acts (1985–88, rev, 1990).
- Scoring A Century (1999) First Performance 4 March 2010 in Birmingham

=== Chorus and orchestra ===
- Lumina (words by Ezra Pound) for soprano, baritone, chorus and orchestra (1969)
- Three Ritsos Choruses for chorus and orchestra without violins (1993 [original for men's voices and guitars, 1992])
- The Fabulous Adventures of Alexander the Great for soloists, young people's choir and orchestra (1996)

=== Unaccompanied chorus ===
- Three Choruses on Poems of Robert Frost (1964)
- Four Songs of Ben Jonson (1965, Oxford University Press)
- What is the Cause? (1967)

=== Orchestra and chamber orchestra ===
- Chamber Symphony (1966)
- Metamorphoses (1971)
- Violin Concerto (1976)
- Sonata alla marcia for chamber orchestra (1978)
- Scherzi ed intermezzi (1984)
- Pastoral Paraphrase for bassoon and small orchestra (1988)
- Cello Concerto (1992)
- Nocturne for string orchestra (1994) [arrangement of A Little More Night Music for saxophone quartet, 1990]

=== Brass band ===
- Mill Music (1990)
- Winelands for symphonic wind ensemble (1997)

=== Voice with orchestra or chamber accompaniment ===
- The Bones of Chuang Tzu (Chang Heng, trans. Arthur Waley), cantata for baritone and small orchestra (1972, orch. 1973 [original version baritone and piano]))
- In Praise of Krishna (from the Bengali) for soprano and 9 instruments (1973)
- From the Mattress Grave (Heinrich Heine) for high voice and 11 instruments (1978)
- Change is Going to Come (various S. African poets), cantata for mezzo, baritone, chorus and 4 players (1982)
- Rise Dove (Aimé Césaire) for bass and orchestra (1983)
- The Griffin's Tale, legend for baritone and small orchestra (1994)
- The Shades of Love (Cavafy) for bass baritone and small orchestra (2000)
- Rings of Jade (Ho Chi Minh, Prison Diary) for medium voice and orchestra (2005)

=== Voice and piano ===
- Beata l'Alma (Herbert Read), cantata for soprano and piano (1966)

=== Chamber music ===
- String Quartet No. 1 (1962)
- Nonet for wind instruments (1971, rev. 1978)
- String Quartet No. 2 (1973)
- Cassation for wind octet (1979)
- Clarinet Quintet (1980)
- Capriccio for 7 players (1980)
- String Quartet No. 3 (1982)
- Seasonal Variants for 7 players (1985)
- Diversions on themes of Hanns Eisler for saxophone and piano (1995)
- Four Intermezzi for violin and piano (1995)
- String Quartet No. 4 (2004)

=== Solo instrumental ===
- Variations for piano (1960)
- Scenes for solo cello (1972)
- Arias for solo clarinet (1978)
- Fantasia for solo violin (1984)
