= Peter Aston =

English composer, academic and conductor (1938–2013)

Peter Aston (5 October 1938 – 13 September 2013) was an English composer, academic and conductor best known for his choral works. Born in Birmingham, he studied at Birmingham School of Music and the University of York. In 1964, he became a lecturer in music in the University of York and in 1974 he was appointed professor of music in the University of East Anglia, where he subsequently became emeritus professor of composition.

Although best known for his liturgical choral works, his output included chamber works for voices and instruments, choral and orchestral works and an opera for children. He is probably best known for his Communion and Magnificat and Nunc Dimittis settings in F.

He founded the Norwich Festival of Contemporary Church Music and he was a Lay Canon of Norwich Cathedral. For fourteen years he was the conductor of the Aldeburgh Festival Singers. He was also involved with the Sacramento Bach Festival Choir and Orchestra. He was an editor of Baroque music and founded the Tudor Consort and the English Baroque Ensembles.

Aston and John Paynter co-authored the book Sound and Silence, published in 1970.
