= Bangers and Mash (radio show) =

British radio comedy show

- Genre: Comedy radio Radio drama
- Running time: 30 minutes
- Country of origin: United Kingdom
- Language(s): English
- Home station: BBC Radio 4
- Starring: Mark Straker; Gerard McDermott; Catherine Harvey
- Written by: Katie Hims
- Original release: January 1999 – February 1999
- No. of episodes: 6

Bangers and Mash was a single-series radio comedy programme that aired from January to February 1999. There were six half-hour episodes and it was broadcast on BBC Radio 4. Written by Katie Hims, and starring Mark Straker, Gerard McDermott, and Catherine Harvey, the show centred on former nun Martina and her (mis)adventures working for a financially troubled catering company.

== Principal Cast ==
- Martina - Catherine Harvey
- Kingsley - Mark Straker
- Jimmy - Gerard McDermott
- Juan José - Roger May
