= John Paynter (composer) =

British composer and music educator

John Frederick Paynter OBE (17 July 1931 – 1 July 2010) was a British composer and music educator known for his advocacy of the cause of creative music making and his emphasis on the importance of music as a subject in the general education of all children. He was Professor of Music at the University of York from 1982 to 1994, serving as Emeritus Professor after his retirement.

== Early career ==
Paynter was born in South London. His working-class family was not strongly musical, but his parents encouraged him to learn the piano. His musical talents were further supported at Emanuel School in Battersea. He was a student at Trinity College of Music, gaining his GTCL in 1952. After national service, he taught in primary, secondary modern and grammar schools. This wide-ranging experience played a significant role in shaping his view that music should be at the heart of the curriculum.

== Academic career ==
In 1962, Paynter began a long career in higher education. He was Lecturer in Music at the City of Liverpool C.F. Mott College of Education, from 1962 to 1965, and Principal Lecturer at the Bishop Otter College in Chichester from 1965 to 1969. He was appointed a Lecturer in the Department of Music at the University of York in 1969. He was promoted to Senior Lecturer in 1974 and was appointed Professor in 1982.

Between 1973 and 1982, he directed the Schools Council Project Music in the Secondary School Curriculum. The project gathered contributions from schools, produced documentary videos of pioneering good practice in a range of schools and culminated with a book with the same title (1982).

Paynter was General Editor of the Resources of Music series for Cambridge University Press between 1969 and 1993. He was Joint Editor of the British Journal of Music Education from 1984 to 1997.

== Professional recognition ==
Paynter was appointed FRSA in 1987, Hon. GSM in 1985. He received the Leslie Boosey Award from the Royal Philharmonic Soc./PRS in 1998. He was appointed OBE in 1985.

== Commentary ==
Paynter's compositions included chamber music, choral works and two children's operas, The Space Dragon of Galata (1978) and The Voyage of St Brendan (1979). Both works involved large forces, combining professional musicians and children in performance. Among teachers, Paynter’s best-known short piece is Autumn, a setting of a Japanese haiku for classroom performance.

Among Paynter’s music composed for adults, his choral settings of Gerard Manley Hopkins' The Windhover, and God's Grandeur are particularly striking in their sensitivity and response to the Christian meaning of Hopkins’ texts.

As an educator, Paynter's publication in 1970 of Sound and Silence had a seminal influence of the practice of classroom music teachers. Paynter was passionate in his conviction that music was exciting for children to explore independently and that the subject could be approached in a multitude of different ways. While the public face of music education in schools tended to concentrate on instrumental learning and teacher-directed performances by choirs and orchestras, the book introduced teachers to ways of helping pupils to explore and make their own interpretive decisions about sounds through working at composing projects.

Paynter’s ideas influenced the development of music in the General Certificate of Secondary Education (GCSE) in the 1980s and in the English National Curriculum in the 1990s. Composing became a core musical activity in both of these programmes of study.

== Selected publications ==
- Mills, J. and Paynter, J.(eds.) Thinking and Making: Selections from the Writings of John Paynter on Music in Education Oxford: Oxford University Press, 2008.
- Paynter, J. and Aston, P. (1970) Sound and Silence. London: Cambridge University Press.
- Paynter, J. (1972) Hear and Now. London: Universal Edition.
- Paynter, J. (1976) All Kinds of Music. Oxford: Oxford University Press.
- Paynter, J. (1982) Music in the Secondary School Curriculum. Cambridge: Cambridge University Press.
- Paynter, J. (1992) Sound and Structure. Cambridge: Cambridge University Press.
- Paynter, J. (ed.) (1992) Companion to Contemporary Musical Thought. London: Routledge
