= Commercial for Cats =

1999 British television advertisement

- Agency: M&C Saatchi
- Client: Pedigree
- Language: English
- Running time: 40 seconds
- Product: Whiskas Singles
- Release date: 27 January 1999
- Written by: Amelia Hibbs
- Directed by: Jason Fisher-Jones
- Country: United Kingdom
- Budget: £750,000

Commercial for Cats, also known as The First Ever Commercial for Cats, is a 1999 British television advertisement for the cat food brand Whiskas, used in the launch of its wet cat food range Whiskas Singles. The 40-second advertisement, directed by Jason Fisher-Jones and created by the agency M&C Saatchi, was novel for featuring an abstract arrangement of visuals and sounds intended for viewing by cats, in attempt to stimulate their senses.

Based on research undertaken by the Waltham Centre for Pet Nutrition, the visuals – which include bright lights, fast movements and high-contrast images of mice, fish, toy birds and string – reflect understanding of cat vision, whereas the sounds – including other cats, birdsong and tweets – relate to food and cat play and are high-pitched to befit a cat's sensitive hearing. The central concept was that cat owners would want to see how their pet responds to the commercial.

The advertisement premiered at primetime during ITV's Coronation Street on 27 January 1999, where it was viewed by an estimated seven million cats. It was preceded by a ten-second preview advert alerting viewers to prepare their cats for the broadcast. In one survey, 80% of consumers responded that their cats reacted favourably to the advertisement. The commercial received wide media attention, including as a news item on the BBC, ITV, Channel 5 and Sky, and international media also ran the story. In the United States, the commercial was remodelled to promote the Whiskas Homestyle Favorites range and ran for a week in June 1999 for primetime viewing on ABC, CBS and NBC. Commercial for Cats won accolades at both the APG and Clio Awards.

== Synopsis ==
Introduced on-screen and with voiceover as The First Ever Commercial for Cats, the advertisement is 40 seconds long and consists of a 'medley' or collage of images and sounds, including colours, movements and noises, designed to appeal to cats and grab their attention. It has been described as the first advertisement for cat food created explicitly for viewing by felines, and "the first advertisement designed to 'talk' to [to cats] in their own language". As The Vancouver Sun describe, it is unique for being "aimed not at the pet owner but directly at the end consumer – the cat".

The advertisement depicts tempting images such as rustling leaves, birds, mice, fish, a ball of string, bright lights, sudden movements and toy canaries, some of which whiz around the screen. (Note: Attributed to multiple sources.) It is accompanied by a soundtrack of high-pitched sounds including chirping birdsong, mouse squeaks, meows, tweets, heavy purring and cat-calling noises. (Note: Attributed to multiple sources.) The inaugural sight in the commercial is a "cat's eye view of the sky obscured by low-hanging leafy branches".

== Background and production ==
Commissioned on behalf of Whiskas owners Pedigree Petfoods, Commercial for Cats was created by the London-based agency M&C Saatchi, on a budget of £750,000 ($825,000), for the British launch of the Whiskas Singles range, individual servings of wet cat food sold in an innovative foil packaging designed to keep its contents fresh and minimise waste. The advertisement marks a departure from Whiskas' standard "eight out of ten cats" campaigns, instead aiming for a more "feline-friendly" approach. It was directed by Jason Fisher-Jones, with art direction from Carlos Anuncibay and Max Landrik, whereas Simon Dicketts acted as creative director. Amelia Hibbs was credited as author.

The advertisement's contents were based on studies of feline behaviour, according to Whisaks the most current scientific research available. Tests were conducted by the Waltham Centre for Pet Nutrition in Leicestershire, where more than 200 felines were shown the advert. The results indicated that around 60% of the cats showed a response. According to M&C Saatchi, many of these cats "looked up or twitched their ears into a listening posture", whereas others "made 'an active response,' such as investigating the television or even tapping the screen." The scientists at the facility advised that the advertisement contains "high-pitched sounds, 'vocalizations' from other cats, high-contrast images such as a mouse silhouette in a bright spotlight, and lots of motion." A cat behaviouralist and researcher at the centre explained: "The images selected for the ads are based on an understanding of how a cat's vision works. The sounds used are related to cats, other animals, food or play and tend to be high-pitched, since cats are especially sensitive to high-pitched sound." According to Clare Garner of The Independent, although the advertisement's contents stem from sincere research into cat behaviour, the campaign's central concept is that cat owners will wish to see how their pet responds.

Maurice Saatchi, Baron Saatchi, the founder of M&C Saatchi, considered Commercial for Cats to constitute a 'new' form of advertising, commenting ahead of the commercial's premiere: "One of the conundrums of petfood advertising has always been that we are advertising to purchasers who don't consume and consumers who don't purchase. Maybe the advertisement will now break new ground." The agency described the phenomenon as "pet-ster power".

== Broadcast ==
The 40-second Commercial for Cats premiered at peak viewing time during an episode of ITV's Coronation Street on Wednesday, 27 January 1999. To emphasise that the commercial is intended for viewing by cats, the broadcast was preceded by a ten-second pre-ad, warning owners to prepare their cats to watch the television. That same night, Commercial for Cats also aired during the middle breaks of Channel 4's showing of E.R. and Channel 5's broadcast of Avenging Angels. Whiskas released a promotional VHS of the advertisement, which was made available for those sending eight Whiskas labels and a postal or cheque order of £1.99. A light-hearted follow-up advert was also produced, based on cats' appreciation of the original advert. Commercial for Cats was also run in France.

At Whiskas' American owners Kal Kan's request, the commercial was adapted for broadcast in the United States by the St. Louis-based D'Arcy Masius Benton & Bowles, to launch the Whiskas Homestyle Favorites range, which contained meat and fish flavors and – similarly to Whiskas Singles – were the first single servings of cat food in the US to be packaged in foil. Whiskas hoped it would reverse sliding sales in the country. The 45-second advertisement aired for one week from Thursday, 3 June 1999, on ABC, CBS and NBC, during primetime hours, while – similarly to Britain – a 15-second advance teaser was run shortly before the main advert, instructing owners to lure their cat to the television. The announcer on the teaser anoints: "In a few moments, you'll see the first ever commercial for cats. Make sure your cat is watching." In the US, Commercial for Cats was intended for limited transmission, not as a replacement for Whiskas' animated mascots Chuck and Marvin. Kal-Kan marketing manager John Curtiss, who considered it a "ground-breaking, cat-pleasing commercial", hoped the campaign would intrigue customers "so that they basically say 'someone who understands my cat well enough to devise a commercial with stimulants that my cat actually responds to probably understands my cat well enough to provide us with a food my cat will like.'"

== Reception ==
=== Cat responses ===
In Britain, Commercial for Cats was viewed by millions of cats, with over 80% of the consumers who responded to the advertisement reporting their cats showed favorable reactions. Following the ad's Coronation Street premiere, viewed by an estimated seven million cats, The Herald noted that "an uncomfortably large proportion" of Britain's pet cats responded to it; conversely, Garner wrote that none of the owners interviewed "reported particularly energetic activity" from their pets. BBC News reported that pets "perked up" during the screening but remained aloof enough to avoid investigating the screen. British sales of Whiskas shot up over 20% following the advertisement.

A journalist for The Herald commented that their own cat was "a little disconcerted" on first viewing, because of the miaowing and purring of the unseen feline in the commercial being "too close to comfort", but that on second viewing, they purred and "watched the screen intently and her ears shelled round to take in the birds twittering, mice squeaking, and cat speaking unto cat." A promotion officer for the Cats Protection League responded that the advert immediately ensnared one of her cats, who kept watching Coronation Street in case it was repeated, while a charity worker for the Wood Green Animal Shelter said their cat was "purring away." According to a Whiskas spokesperson, the advert also proved popular with toddlers and dogs; the Southern Daily Echo ran a story on an Alsatian who "shot off to look for a cat" when the advert appeared during an episode of This Morning, while The Daily Telegraph reported on a hamster's bad reaction to the purring.

=== Media reception ===
The advertisement received widespread media coverage, including items on BBC Breakfast, ITV News at Ten, 5 News and Sky News, and articles in The Independent, The Times and Evening Standard. International interest followed through coverage from Reuters and the Press Association, leading to items on Good Morning America, France 2, Canada's CBC and The Malaysian Times. BBC Radio 4's Today also featured discussion on the advertisement, with both cat lovers and haters on the panel finding it amusing. "Across the country," The Herald wrote of its premiere, "we fell for it, with a sceptical smirk playing about our collective lips." The Sun and The Northern Echo printed a telephone number and an address, respectively, for readers to report their cats' reactions. Campaign's Dominic Mills writes that the media interviewed cat experts and gathered felines to test the agency's claims and "[give] Whiskas the kind of editorial coverage money couldn't buy."

Commenting on their purchase of Whiskas Singles following their cat's positive reaction to the ad, The Herald's journalist opined: "These advertising companies actually do have us sussed, and that is very, very worrying. Who needs to employ subliminal techniques when the above-board ones work so well?" They compared it to pre-Christmas advertisements for children's toys which are aimed at their parents, where the purchases and consumers are similarly separate groups, adding that Whiskas' advertisement proves "how easily we cave in even when we believe we are being worldly wise and cynical about the advertising game." The Independent's Clare Garner considered it a groundbreaking promotion but noted the varied reactions of cats. Richard Ingrams of The Observer, who turned down the role of voice-over for Commercial for Cats, dismissed the advert as "a pitiful affair featuring squeaky noises, bright lights and toy canaries whizzing up and down on elastic" which would fail to impress any "self-regarding cat". Despite three of her cats responding to the commercial, the Evening Standard's Mira Bar-Hillel was unimpressed, saying: "It was a bit unnerving, especially to those of a nervous disposition. I think they should stick to aiming the advert at the owners, not the cats." Her colleague, Sarah Shannon, wrote that "it was only a matter of time before our pets were spoken to", likening in it to the television series Teletubbies speaking "baby language" at its infant viewership and toy adverts aimed at children.

In the US, before announcement of the American transmission of the spot, Susan Lauder of the Petaluma Argus-Courier responded to the British advert; though expressing scepticism at how their cat's reaction to "sounds of squeaking mice" relate to the nutritional value and taste of Whiskas, and doubting that they would buy the product if their cat enjoyed the "picture of a bird", they found it an "intriguing" idea for an advertisement and considered it "a shame" that it was not being broadcast in the US. Following its US broadcast, Hillary Chura of Advertising Age described the advertisement as "offbeat", whereas Paula Span of The Washington Post quipped: "No celebrities. No humor. No zowie computer graphics or cool music. As TV ads go, this one is frankly unimpressive. Unless you're a cat."

== Legacy ==
At the APG Creative Planning Awards 1999, Commercial for Cats won the "Special Award" for "Most Innovative Use of Research". According to Campaign Live, the judges were enthused by the equal use of "classic research skills and determination" to "turn an apparently crazy idea into reality", adding that "[the] creative idea of doing an ad for cats (rather than the owner-intermediaries) seemed impossible to pull off. But planning helped [the creative team] make it a reality by working with cat psychologists to understand how cats see and what stimulus they respond to", with these efforts evident in the "fresh" final advertisement. In 2000, Commercial for Cats won the "Home Products Award" at the 41st Annual Clio Awards. In 2011, Business Insider included First Ever Commercial for Cats in a list of major companies 'juming the bandwagon' by using "cat videos" as a business model.

In 2004, Jason Deans of The Guardian wrote that, by broadcasting Commercial for Cats, ITV presaged the BBC in becoming the first broadcaster to "appeal directly to pets", ahead of the interactive BBC Red Button service Pet TV, which ran for a week in May 2004 and contained loops of abstract images and sounds in an attempt to discover what programming pets would respond to. A fellow journalist for the publication commented that Pet TV "echoes" the Whiskas advert.

== See also ==
- 1999 in British television
