= 1999 in British television =

This is a list of British television related events from 1999.

== Events ==
=== January ===
- 1 January
  - New Year's Day highlights on BBC One include Ron Howard's acclaimed 1995 Astronaut drama Apollo 13, starring Tom Hanks, Kevin Bacon, Bill Paxton, Gary Sinise and Ed Harris.
  - Denise van Outen presents her final edition of The Big Breakfast although she will return in September of the following year.
  - In Coronation Street, four-decade resident Alf Roberts dies of a heart attack, just one month before the real-life death of Bryan Mosley, the actor who had portrayed him since his debut in 1961.
- 3–4 January – BBC One airs a two-part adaptation of Andy McNab's book Bravo Two Zero, starring Sean Bean as McNab and set during the Gulf War.
- 4 January
  - GMTV2 launches during the breakfast downtime of ITV2.
  - Debut of The Vanessa Show with Vanessa Feltz on BBC One.
  - Australian children's drama Misery Guts begins to air on BBC One.
  - Canadian television series for preschoolers Polka Dot Shorts begins to air in the UK on BBC Two. The series is so popular in the UK, it continues airing on the BBC for 6 years until 2004 and a range of videos of the series is released by Abbey Home Media.
  - UK debut of The Powerpuff Girls on Cartoon Network.
  - Debut of Canadian science-fiction drama television series First Wave on Sky One, starring Sebastian Spence.
- 5 January
  - Provisional viewing figures suggest that an episode of ITV's Who Wants to Be a Millionaire? aired on 3 January was watched by 17 million viewers, making it the highest viewed television programme, excluding soaps and World Cup matches since 1997.
  - As he prepares to launch a new series of Parkinson, broadcaster Michael Parkinson criticises his chat show rival, footballer Ian Wright telling BBC Radio 5 Live's Sybil Ruscoe that Wright has a "careless attitude" and does not have the "understanding" to do his job properly.
- 6 January
  - In a stunt organised by the recently launched "lads magazine" Front, television presenter Noel Edmonds is hit in the face with two custard pies while filming for Noel's House Party in London's Oxford Street.
  - A Broadcasting Standards Commission survey indicates that many viewers believe sex is used on television in order to boost ratings.
- 7 January – BBC One airs the network television premiere of Braveheart, Mel Gibson's 1995 historical drama about the late-13th century warrior William Wallace who led Scots clans in the fight for Scottish independence; it also stars Patrick McGoohan, Brendan Gleeson, Catherine McCormack and Sophie Marceau in her first English-language appearance.
- 8 January
  - Teenage model Kelly Brook is chosen to replace Denise van Outen as co-host of Channel 4's The Big Breakfast alongside Johnny Vaughan.
  - Nita Desai, played by Rebecca Sarker arrives in Coronation Street to take over from Ashley Peacock (Steven Arnold) as manager of the corner shop. She is the first member of the Desai family—the soap's first Asian family—to be seen on screen.
  - Debut of the sitcom Gimme Gimme Gimme on BBC Two, starring Kathy Burke and James Dreyfus.
- 10 January –
  - ITV replaces its long-running Sunday morning church service broadcast, Morning Worship, with a new religious magazine programme, Sunday Morning, which includes a short service. The first venue for the programme is Frinton Free Church in Frinton-on-Sea, Essex.
  - ITV begins a six-part adaptation of Bill Bryson's Notes from a Small Island.
- 11 January – The black comedy show The League of Gentlemen debuts on BBC Two. Along with The Fast Show and Goodness Gracious Me, it is credited with boosting international interest in British comedy series.
- 12 January
  - Debut of the Casualty spin-off, Holby City on BBC One. Among the cast are several former soap stars including Michael French, Angela Griffin, Nicola Stephenson and Lisa Faulkner.
  - Airline returns to ITV for a second series with EasyJet now as the featured company.
- 13 January – BBC One's audience share drops below 30% for the first time.
- 16 January – ITV's On the Ball has been recommissioned for a second run for the 1999–2000 football season despite getting off to a slow start, The Mirror newspaper reports.
- 18 January – British Eurosport launches, replacing the pan-European version on most platforms. The change sees the introduction of live studio presentation of major events.
- 19 January
  - ITV's This Morning becomes the first programme on British television to show men how to check themselves for signs of testicular cancer.
  - Carlton Communications has spent £91 million on a library of 300 films from Universal Studios. The titles which were part of the ITC Television library, include The Eagle Has Landed, The Big Easy, Sophie's Choice, Thunderbirds, The Saint, Captain Scarlet and the Mysterons and Jesus of Nazareth.
  - Claire King makes her final regular appearance as Emmerdale character Kim Tate after a decade with the series. Following a two decades long absence from the soap in September 2018, ITV confirms King will reprise the role for a special week of episodes from 8 October 2018.
- 20 January
  - The UK government says no political pressure was applied to the BBC over its decision not to give Scotland a separate version of the Six O'Clock News.
  - ITV announces that Michael Nicholson and Jonathan Maitland will join Trevor McDonald to present a new current affairs programme for the network.
  - Channel 4 defends a segment on today's edition of The Big Breakfast in which guest presenter Jenny McCarthy assumes a number of suggestive poses as she plays a "Guess the Balls" game with footballer Vinnie Jones. The item appears at 8:30am when the content can be viewed by children, but a Channel 4 spokesman tells Scotland's Daily Record that "Jenny McCarthy's performance within this criteria has been stunning and we see no areas where she has let us or the public down this week."
  - The Broadcasting Standards Commission upholds viewer complaints against the TV series Compromising Situations, aired on Channel 5 as well as the film Centerfold which the network aired in Summer 1998. Channel 5 is also criticised by the BSC for making sexually explicit material available on free-to-air television.
- 21 January – ITV and Channel 4 sign a deal with Metro-Goldwyn-Mayer.
- 27 January
  - After upholding four viewer complaints about Compromising Situations, a late-night erotic anthology series aired on Channel 5, the Broadcasting Standards Commission warns that erotic content on the channel could lead to soft porn being shown on mainstream television. The Commission expresses the opinion that complaints about Compromising Situations and another series, Hot Line raises "significant issues for public debate". The ruling leads to a row between the Commission and Channel 5, with its chief executive David Elstein, comparing the reprimand to the 1960 prosecution of Penguin Books over its publication of Lady Chatterley's Lover.
  - Cat food brand Whiskas premieres "the first ever commercial for cats" during Coronation Street, receiving wide media coverage
- 29 January – Channel 5 airs episode 480 of Family Affairs which sees the entire Hart family killed in a boat explosion. The episode marks a change in direction for the soap which is to move from its riverside location to west London.

=== February ===
- 1 February
  - Kelly Brook takes over from Denise van Outen as co-presenter of Channel 4's The Big Breakfast.
  - The Channel 4 Political Awards is broadcast for the first time.
- 2 February – As Glenn Hoddle is sacked as England football manager following the controversy over comments he made during a recent interview it is revealed his 13-year-old daughter Zara, wrote to the BBC's Ceefax asking people to leave Hoddle alone to get on with his job.
- 3 February
  - It is reported that Martini is to sign a £1 million contract with ITV to sponsor a season of James Bond films. The channel is planning to screen all 18 Bond films, beginning with GoldenEye in March, then broadcasting them in chronological order from Dr. No to Tomorrow Never Dies. GoldenEye airs at 8.30 pm on 10 March. Dr. No is screened on 29 May. Tomorrow Never Dies makes its television debut on 13 October.
  - The US romantic comedy-drama Sex and the City makes its British television debut on Channel 4.
- 8 February – Following a five-week trial at Manchester Crown Court, former Central News reporter John Caine is convicted of sexually abusing underage boys over a period of two decades and jailed for five and a half years.
- 11 February – Three members of production staff are suspended from BBC One's The Vanessa Show following reports in The Mirror that fake guests appeared on the programme. They are later sacked following an internal inquiry.
- 12 February – ITV's Trisha show is caught up in a fake guests controversy after it emerges that the agent who supplied guests to the rival Vanessa Show did the same for Trisha, but the show's editor Sally-Ann Howard, denies any of her team were aware that the guests were fakes.
- 13 February – BBC One airs "Face Value", the 250th episode of Casualty.
- 15 February – ITV axes Gladiators after eight years due to falling ratings. A final mini-series featuring returning champions is commissioned by ONdigital to air in May before being shown on the main ITV network at the end of the year.
- 18 February – ITV screens the Granada Television film The Murder of Stephen Lawrence, a dramatisation of the aftermath of the 1993 murder of Stephen Lawrence told from the point of view of his parents.
- 21 February – US/Canadian animated series for preschoolers Salty's Lighthouse which uses footage taken from the children's model animated series that was originally broadcast on ITV is shown on Channel 4 for the first time in the UK. At the same time, it is also the second time Tugs is shown in its homeland.
- 23 February – Channel 4 debuts Russell T. Davies's groundbreaking series Queer as Folk.
- 25 February
  - The BBC announces that Noel's House Party will be axed after eight years. The most recent edition of the show drew an audience of less than six million and it will finish when its current run ends on 20 March.
  - The Broadcasting Standards Commission upholds a complaint about a feature in the Teletext games magazine Digitiser from 26 October 1998. The gossip column, Gossi the Dog had alluded to Gossi's master thrashing the talking cartoon dog with a belt.
- 26 February
  - Channel 4 News presenter Sheena McDonald is in intensive care after receiving head injuries when she was hit by a police van on an emergency call in north London.
  - Channel 4 is fined £150,000 by the Independent Television Commission for including fake scenes in Too Much Too Young: Chickens, a documentary about rent boys in Glasgow that aired in 1997. The fine is the first such penalty imposed on Channel 4.

=== March ===
- 2 March – Wheel of Fortune is moved to an afternoon slot. The star prize is reduced from a choice of £20,000 or a car to a regular jackpot of £2,000.
- 4 March – BBC Prime is launched for the first time in South Africa.
- 5 March – After 32 years, what is billed as the last ever News at Ten is broadcast on ITV. It is replaced with a 6:30pm bulletin, the ITV Evening News from the following Monday. In the event, News at Ten returns in 2001, is axed again in 2004, and resurrected in 2008. It is restored as a five-nights-a-week programme from March 2009. This day also sees the final broadcast of the ITN Early Evening News in its long-running 5:40pm slot. The changes at ITV also prompt other broadcasters to review their news scheduling with Sky News and BBC News 24 both launch 10pm bulletins to fill the gap left by News at Ten, while Channel 5 reschedules its evening news bulletin to 6pm. Channel 4 News is also relaunched.
- 7 March – BBC Two airs the final episode of the 1993 series of Grange Hill, concluding a Sunday morning rerun of the first 16 series of the school drama which began in April 1993.
- 8 March
  - ITV News is relaunched with a new set and a revised schedule. The ITV Lunchtime News remains at 12:30pm and is now co-anchored by Julia Somerville and John Suchet. At 6:30pm, the brand new half-hour ITV Evening News, anchored by Trevor McDonald, debuts and the ITV Nightly News debuts at 11pm, anchored by Dermot Murnaghan, with a 60 second summary airing beforehand at 10pm. All weekend bulletins are now presented under the umbrella title of ITV Weekend News, with Saturday teatime bulletins introduced as ITV Weekend News and Sport to reflect its dedicated sports segment within that specific edition. Overnight news summaries and the ITV Morning News continue to use the previous set and branding used since 1995 until June of the following year.
  - Following the introduction of the ITV Evening News, UTV's evening news programme, UTV Live is brought forward by half an hour to start at 5:30pm. The first half-hour sees feature reports, light-hearted stories and the weather forecast branded as part of a separate programme, UTV Life which runs before the main evening news which starts at 6pm and keeps the UTV Live name.
- 9 March – A contestant who won £125,000 on Who Wants to Be a Millionaire? despite answering a question incorrectly will be allowed to keep his prize money, it is reported. The error occurred after researchers matched the wrong answer with a question about tennis, but the mistake was quickly spotted by viewers. Celador which produces the show, says it will review its checking procedure.
- 10 March
  - Carlton Television buys Bob Geldof's production company, Planet 24, in a deal City analysts believe to be worth £15 million.
  - The Vanessa Show is interrupted by a male streaker. The lads' magazine Front later claims responsibility for the stunt.
  - ITV shows the network television premiere of Martin Campbell's 1995 James Bond film GoldenEye, starring Pierce Brosnan as 007.
- 11 March
  - Reports that new The Big Breakfast presenter Kelly Brook is struggling with her presenting role are laughed off by the programme after an email from its assistant producer suggested the number of big words in her script should be limited was leaked to the media.
  - ITV shows the network television premiere of the 1994 Sylvester Stallone and Sharon Stone action film The Specialist.
- 12 March – This year's Comic Relief telethon includes a Doctor Who parody featuring Rowan Atkinson as The Doctor, Julia Sawalha as his sidekick and Jonathan Pryce as The Master. The 29-minute sketch, written by Steven Moffat also includes the first female version of The Doctor, portrayed by Joanna Lumley. A special episode of The Vicar of Dibley includes cameo appearances by Johnny Depp and Sarah, Duchess of York.
- 15 March
  - Debut of the BBC One prison documentary series Jailbirds, a ten-part series that looks at life inside New Hall women's prison in West Yorkshire.
  - Provisional viewing figures released for the first week of ITV's schedule changes indicate the channel enjoyed a 5% increase in ratings. ITV says it is pleased with the results, but expects the figures to drop again following the initial interest in its new lineup.
  - The BBC children's programme Teletubbies goes on the air in Japan.
  - UK debut of Ed, Edd n Eddy on Cartoon Network.
- 16 March – The NSPCC launches its new 'full stop' advertising campaign which shows different objects of childhood heroes shielding their eyes as children's voices are heard being abused. It is broadcast after the 9.00pm watershed as a shock tactic to break people's complacency, part of the largest campaign ever undertaken by a charity and the beginning of a long-term strategy to end violence against children.
- 17 March
  - Entertainer Rod Hull dies after falling from the roof of his house while trying to adjust a television aerial.
  - The Surfer advertisement for Guinness first airs on ITV.
  - An attempt by BSkyB to buy Manchester United F.C. is rejected by the Monopolies and Mergers Commission.
  - To celebrate the recently aired 250th episode of Casualty, BBC One airs Casualty 250: the Full Medical, a documentary in which Gaby Roslin looks back at the show's history. Later the same evening sees a repeat of "Gas", the very first episode from 1986.
- 19 March – The gameshow Mr and Mrs is relaunched by ITV as one of its new programmes airing in the former News at Ten slot. Hosted by Julian Clary and featuring more adult orientated humour than its original incarnation, it is not successful and is axed after just one series.
- 20 March
  - The network television premiere of Roger Donaldson's 1995 American science-fiction horror Species on ITV, starring Michael Madsen, Marg Helgenberger, Forest Whitaker, Ben Kingsley and Natasha Henstridge.
  - The final episode of Noel's House Party is shown on BBC One.
- 21 March – Ernie Wise, the surviving half of the beloved comedy duo, Morecambe and Wise dies of a heart attack, aged 73, following ongoing heart trouble.
- 22 March
  - It is announced that The Jack Docherty Show will end after two years as host Jack Docherty is to leave Channel 5. He says the show has "burned out" and is running out of guests. The final edition airs on 23 June.
  - A November 1998 episode of the children's series Sooty & Co. about fragrances in which the characters were seen sniffing medicine bottles is criticised by the Independent Television Commission amid concerns it could prompt copycat behaviour.
- 24 March
  - Major networks provide news coverage as NATO launches air strikes against the Federal Republic of Yugoslavia.
  - The BBC confirms that Ross Kemp who plays Grant Mitchell in EastEnders, will leave the soap in the Autumn after signing a contract with ITV.
  - Mirror Group sells its 18.6% stake in SMG to Granada.
- 26 March – Debut of As the Crow Flies, a seven-part BBC Two series in which Janet Street-Porter sets out to walk the 350 miles between the Edinburgh and Greenwich observatories.
- 28 March – Lloyd Burgess wins the 1999 series of MasterChef.
- 29 March
  - Pokémon makes its British television debut on Sky One.
  - The final episode of the children's series Bodger & Badger is aired on BBC One.
- 30 March
  - UKTV announces plans to rebrand UK Gold Classics as UK Gold 2. The changes will take place from the coming weekend.
  - ITV, Channel 4 and Channel 5 are heavily criticised in the Independent Television Commission's annual report on commercial television. ITV is criticised for its low amount of current affairs coverage, particularly in relation to the NATO campaign in Yugoslavia, while Channel 5 is branded as "tacky" for its reliance on low-budget erotic dramas and factual programmes about sex for its late-night schedule.
- 31 March – ITV announces that Mary Nightingale will take over as presenter of its long-running holiday show Wish You Were Here...?, succeeding Anthea Turner who is stepping down from the role.

=== April ===
- 1 April
  - The BBC announces that Craig Doyle will succeed Jill Dando as the presenter of Holiday.
  - In EastEnders the Queen Vic landlady Peggy Mitchell, played by Barbara Windsor, marries Frank Butcher (Mike Reid).
- 2 April
  - After two and a half years, Channel 4 is given another whole new look replacing the previous circles idents with all-new idents with the Channel 4 logo in a square and lines against various backgrounds scrolling across the screen.
  - UK Gold launches new fireworks idents and UK Gold Classics is renamed UK Gold 2. It operates as a time-shift service of UK Gold by broadcasting the channel's daytime output during the evening.
  - The two-part adaptation of Minette Walters 1995 crime novel The Dark Room airs on BBC One, starring Dervla Kirwan as the shaven-headed Jane "Jinx" Kingsley and James Wilby as Dr. Protheroe. The serial concludes on 3 April, ending a run of her novels adapted for television which began in February 1996 with The Sculptress.
  - BBC One airs Parkinson Meets Woody Allen, a 50-minute programme in which film director Woody Allen gives his first British television interview for 35 years. Allen is questioned extensively about his private life by host Michael Parkinson, but is reluctant to speak on some topics. The BBC subsequently rejects reports that Allen had asked producers to edit out parts of the interview in which he discusses his marriage to his stepdaughter.
- 4 April – Sky One airs its special Valentine's Day episode of The Simpsons, featuring guest appearance by British pop superstar Elton John.
- 5 April
  - BBC One and ITV air a national television appeal to help refugees from Kosovo. The Kosovo Crisis Appeal, co-ordinated by the Disasters Emergency Committee raises £3m by midday the following day.
  - ITV airs Martine McCutcheon: This is My Moment, a one-hour documentary chronicling former EastEnders actress Martine McCutcheon's efforts to launch her singing career. Her debut single, "Perfect Moment", reaches number one in the UK Singles Chart on 11 April.
- 8 April
  - Debut of the BBC children's series Miami 7 featuring the manufactured pop group S Club 7. The series combines drama and musical performance and is intended as a vehicle to launch the group's music career with their debut single "Bring It All Back" being released on 7 June.
  - ITV launches its new news and current affairs programme Tonight with Trevor McDonald. Based on the format of US shows such as 60 Minutes and featuring a team of high-profile journalists, the first edition features an interview with the five individuals suspected of the murder of Stephen Lawrence. The launch comes amid reports that ITV news coverage has lost as many as a million viewers since News at Ten was axed in March. The edition prompts fifteen complaints to the Independent Television Commission from viewers who felt it wrong to give the men a platform to defend themselves, but the Commission rules in August that Martin Bashir's questioning had meant the programme was "anything but a platform" for the suspects.
- 9 April – Secretary of State for Trade and Industry Stephen Byers announces that BSkyB's £626m bid to buy Manchester United will not be allowed to go ahead.
- 12 April – Long-running children's animated television series Bob the Builder begins on BBC One, filmed in stop-motion.
- 13 April – Past and present stars of Coronation Street attend a memorial service for Bryan Mosley at Salford Cathedral.
- 14 April – ITV airs the network television premiere of Girls' Night, a film produced by Granada Television as part of the ITV Film Initiative, a scheme established in 1996 aimed at boosting the British film industry and increasing the number of home grown films.
- 15 April – A fire breaks out at the headquarters of MTV Europe, the former TV-am Breakfast Television Centre, in Camden, London, forcing them off air while the fire is being tackled.
- 19 April – US talk show presenter Jerry Springer makes his UK television debut presenting the first of two editions of This Morning alongside Judy Finnigan while her husband Richard Madeley is busy working on another television project.
- 20 April – It is emerged that Channel 4 have asked the producers of Brookside to tone down an attempted rape scene due to air the following evening because the content may be too graphic to air before the 9pm watershed.
- 21 April – A week after the government announces new targets for the proportion of ethnic police officers, ITV's The Bill announces two new black characters will join the series. Police Constable Di Worrell, played by Jane Wall and Detective Constable Danny Glaze (Karl Collins) who will become the show's first black male CID officer. The Bill's producers say the announcement is not a response to the government initiative, but had been planned for several months.
- 22 April – Socialite Tara Palmer-Tomkinson appears on The Frank Skinner Show slurring her words and being unsure who the host is; she enters drug rehabilitation shortly afterwards.
- 26 April
  - Television presenter Jill Dando is shot dead outside her home in west London. Her death sparks a huge manhunt by the Metropolitan Police and leads to the trial of Barry George. Initially convicted of the murder, after a successful appeal and retrial George is acquitted on 1 August 2008, thus leaving the crime unsolved.
  - BSkyB Chief Executive Mark Booth announces his resignation after 18 months in the position.
- 27 April
  - The Open University wins the 1998–99 series of University Challenge, beating Oriel College, Oxford 265–210.
  - Channel 5 announces plans to resurrect It's a Knockout with original presenter Stuart Hall at the helm. The channel is also bringing Jeremy Beadle back to television with a new series in which contestants win his money.
- 28 April – BBC Two debuts My Year with Beethoven, a six-part programme in which German violinist Anne-Sophie Mutter talks about the devastating impact which the onset of deafness had on Beethoven's life and music, accompanied by American pianist Lambert Orkis who performs one of Beethoven's most tempestuous works on a personal journey throughout ten different sonatas. The series continues on 11 May.
- 29 April
  - Six episodes of Channel 5's Sex and Shopping are criticised by the Broadcasting Standards Commission for containing explicit material which the Commission feels was "unacceptable for broadcast at any time".
  - Retailer WHSmith announces plans to sell books and stationary via interactive digital television after signing a deal with the Rupert Murdoch backed venture Open.
  - The Planets, an eight-part documentary series exploring the Solar System, debuts on BBC Two.
- 30 April
  - The BBC is reviewing whether or not to air the remaining episodes of Antiques Inspectors following Jill Dando's murder, Broadcast magazine reports. The series had made its debut with Dando as presenter on 25 April with filming of the final episode completed two days before that. The programme is subsequently cancelled, but it is decided later in the year that it should be aired as a tribute to the presenter with the series beginning its run from 5 September.
  - Sky Soap closes due to poor viewing figures.
  - Scottish Television launches S2.

=== May ===
- 1 May
  - Channel 4 airs Now We Are Two, a weekend of programmes marking the second anniversary of the election of Tony Blair's Labour Government. On this day, If John Smith Had Lived imagines the direction the Labour Party might have taken under the leadership of John Smith, while The Trial of Margaret Thatcher debates the policies of former Conservative Prime Minister Margaret Thatcher in a courtroom setting. The following day, Blair's Third Way looks at Tony Blair's governing style.
  - From the Earth to the Moon, a thirteen-part spin-off from the film Apollo 13 made by HBO debuts on Channel 4.
  - The cable-only film service Home Video Channel closes after 14 years on air.
- 2 May – Sheena McDonald is released from hospital two months after she received severe head injuries when she was hit by a police van.
- 5 May – An inquest into the death of Rod Hull records a verdict of accidental death.
- 6–7 May – BBC One provides coverage of the first elections to the Scottish Parliament and Welsh Assembly, as well as the year's local elections.
- 7 May – Martyn Lewis presented his final news bulletin for BBC News.
- 9 May – Michael Parkinson presents the 1999 British Television Academy Awards in which the UK television industry pays tribute to the late Jill Dando. She had been due to host the ceremony alongside Parkinson, but following her death the BBC had decided not to replace her.
- 10 May – BBC News relaunches with a new set and theme music composed by David Lowe. The Six O'Clock News switches to a solo presenter format with Huw Edwards as the main anchor whilst Anna Ford becomes the new main anchor of the One O'Clock News. BBC News 24 adopts the new look in October.
- 11 May
  - News at Ten and World in Action, both of which have been axed by ITV are announced as winners at the Royal Television Society's Journalism Awards. News at Ten is voted programme of the year, while World in Action wins the judges' award. Other winners include the Nine O'Clock News in the international category for its coverage of the Drenica massacre and Dermot Murnaghan for an ITV Lunchtime News interview with Peter Mandelson in which he questioned the politician about his loan from Geoffrey Robinson.
  - The BBC confirms that EastEnders actress Danniella Westbrook will return to the soap as Sam Mitchell in the Summer, three years after she was last seen on screen.
- 14 May – Helen Rollason presents the first Friday sport bulletin on the BBC's Six O'Clock News.
- 17 May
  - The Independent Television Commission rejects a number of viewer complaints about editions of The Jerry Springer Show featuring a gay marriage and amateur strippers that aired on weekday afternoons as not being inappropriate viewing. The Commission finds that the subject of same-sex marriage was dealt with sensitively, while the episode featuring the strippers was "not explicit" because they had only removed some of their clothes. However, a complaint is upheld against Sky One's Bloody Foreigners that aired on 2 March which featured an interview with a female member of a wife-swapping club while an explicit pornographic film played on a television in the background.
  - Channel 4 airs the network television premiere of Bill Condon's 1995 American horror sequel film Candyman: Farewell to the Flesh, starring Tony Todd and Kelly Rowan.
- 18 May – The BBC's Crimewatch programme broadcasts a reconstruction of presenter Jill Dando's murder. The show opens without its usual titles and music.
- 19 May – ITV airs the first British Soap Awards, which are presented by Richard Madeley and Judy Finnigan. The Awards ceremony had been recorded the previous weekend.
- 20 May
  - The first Pride of Britain Awards, an annual event launched by The Mirror newspaper to honour ordinary people who have acted bravely or extraordinarily in challenging situations is presented by Carol Vorderman at London's Dorchester Hotel. The Awards are such a success that ITV agrees to screen the second event the following year.
  - The broadcasters union BECTU condemns plans to air a Party election broadcast by the far right British National Party due to be shown on 21 May and says it will support any of its members who refuse to work on the broadcast. The BNP has been allocated a party political broadcast slot for the forthcoming European election after fielding enough candidates to qualify for free airtime during the election campaign. The Independent Television Commission receives seven complaints from viewers that the BNP should not have been allowed to air their views, but the Commission later rules that none of its rules were breached because the broadcast did not mention race or immigration and to ban the BNP from television on principle would be undemocratic.
- 21 May – The funeral of Jill Dando is held in her home town of Weston-super-Mare in Somerset. Although the service itself is private, footage is relayed to a crowd gathered in the town's Ellensborough Park East.
- 24 May – The Digital Spy website reports that UK Gold 2 is to have its broadcasting hours extended from 1 June. The channel has operated on a limited basis, airing on Fridays to Sundays from 6pm to 2am, but will become a daily service.
- 25 May – Bostock's Cup a single comedy-drama about a fictional football team winning the 1974 FA Cup Final airs on ITV.
- 26 May
  - Following a ten-day trial at London's Snaresbrook Crown Court, former London's Burning actor John Alford is jailed for nine months after being convicted of supplying cocaine and cannabis resin to an undercover reporter. He has been the victim of a sting by a tabloid newspaper, a factor taken into account in his sentencing. He is released from prison six weeks later.
  - 19 million viewers see Manchester United complete The Treble by beating Bayern Munich 2–1 in injury time in the 1999 UEFA Champions League Final at the Camp Nou stadium in Barcelona.
- 27 May – The Broadcasting Standards Commission upholds several viewer complaints about an episode of EastEnders aired on Valentine's Day that featured the killing of the character Saskia Duncan which the watchdog rules was too graphic to be shown before the watershed when the content could be seen by children.
- 28 May – The BBC have signed a deal to air the network television premiere of Titanic.
- 29 May – Sweden's Charlotte Nilsson wins the 1999 Eurovision Song Contest in Jerusalem with "Take Me to Your Heaven".
- 29–31 May – The final mini-series of Gladiators is aired exclusively on the ONdigital platform. The four episodes would be later shown on ITV at Christmas.

=== June ===
- 1 June
  - ITN's Bill Neely sends a report from the Albania-Kosovo border as NATO aircraft mistakenly bomb Albanian army forces on the Albanian side of the border, destroying a guard box.
  - The educational channel BBC Knowledge goes on the air.
  - Debut of ITV's gritty prison drama Bad Girls, a series set in a high security women's prison.
- 4 June – ITV airs the final edition of the 1999 series of Play Your Cards Right, the last of the current run since the series was revived in 1994. It will be revived again in 2002 but axed again a year later.
- 5 June – Ian Moor wins the tenth series of Stars in Their Eyes, performing as Chris De Burgh.
- 6 June – Six TV, Britain's sixth and last free-to-air terrestrial analogue local channel, broadcast on UHF under a restricted television service licence, launches in both Oxfordshire and Southampton as the Oxford channel in Oxfordshire and the Southampton channel in Hampshire.
- 7 June – A study by the Broadcasting Standards Commission finds an increase in the number of viewer complaints about the amount of sex on television. Among those surveyed, the number feeling there was too much sex on television rose from 32% in 1997 to 38% in 1998.
- 8 June – The BBC axes the Hale and Pace entertainment series h&p@bbc due to poor ratings. The series was planned to "hilariously interact" with the public.
- 10 June – BBC One announces that the short-lived The Vanessa Show which was at the centre of a fake guests controversy earlier in the year, will be axed. The final edition will air on 23 July.
- 12 June
  - Debut of Winning Lines, the BBC's new National Lottery game show hosted by Simon Mayo. Viewers could interact by phoning in to apply to be a contestant on the show if the numbers generated in the opening round of the game matched the last six digits of their phone number. The show also includes the launch of Thunderball, a new game to accompany the main Lottery draw on Saturday nights onwards.
  - Following two special one-offs the previous year, Man O Man returns to ITV for a full series of eight episodes.
- 13 June
  - S Club 7, stars of the BBC children's television series Miami 7, reach number one in the UK Singles Chart with their debut single "Bring It All Back".
  - Changing Places, the Heartbeat spin-off starring Nick Berry that takes his character, PC Nick Rowan, to Canada after Berry left the series, receives its debut on ITV.
- 19 June – The wedding of Prince Edward and Sophie Rhys-Jones takes place at St George's Chapel, Windsor.
- 20 June – The BBC broadcasts live cricket for the final time for more than 20 years when it shows live coverage of the 1999 Cricket World Cup Final, bringing to an end sixty years of continuous cricket coverage on the BBC. The terrestrial rights now transfer to Channel 4.
- 22 June – The Independent Television Commission criticises Channel 4 for failing to warn viewers about the level of explicit sex scenes in its controversial gay drama, Queer as Folk. Concern is also expressed about the series first episode which included a scene portraying the seduction of a teenager below the age of consent by an older gay male, but says the content did not breach broadcasting regulations.
- 24 June – The Broadcasting Standards Commission rejects viewer complaints about the second series of BBC One drama The Lakes which had featured sexual violence, rape and a relationship between a Roman Catholic priest and a member of his congregation, saying the programme "had not exceeded acceptable boundaries".
- 25 June – It is announced that Pearson TV chairman Greg Dyke will succeed John Birt as Director-General of the BBC from April 2000.
- 28 June
  - BBC One airs the last episode in the original run of its time-travelling comedy series Goodnight Sweetheart. It returns in 2016 for a one-off special as part of the BBC's 60th anniversary of comedy celebrations.
  - Ulster Television launches TV You (later UTV2).
- 30 June – Janet Street-Porter, pioneer of "yoof" television at the BBC, is appointed as editor of The Independent on Sunday, her first major role in print journalism.

=== July ===
- 1 July
  - BBC One airs a special edition of Question Time from Birmingham featuring Leader of the Opposition William Hague as the sole panelist.
  - Channel 4 starts broadcasting cricket following the channel sensationally obtaining the rights from the BBC the previous year.
- 3 July
  - Following a one-off pilot the previous year, Give Your Mate a Break returns to ITV for a full series of six episodes. Les Dennis takes over as host from John Leslie, who had hosted the pilot episode.
  - FilmFour will launch an interactive service similar to Digital Teletext, the website Digital Spy reports.
- 5 July – BBC One Controller Peter Salmon has commissioned a World in Action-style investigative series to air as part of the Autumn schedule. The as-yet untitled programme is being developed by several members of the team who formerly worked for the now defunct ITV programme.
- 6 July
  - BBC Director-General John Birt warns that the increase in paid for digital television could lead to a "knowledge underclass" if public service broadcasters such as the BBC do not remain universally available.
  - ITV unveils its first Autumn schedule since moving News at Ten to a later time slot. Highlights include a new adaptation of Charles Dickens' novel Oliver Twist, written by Alan Bleasdale that will attempt to update the character of Fagin, moving him away from the Ron Moody interpretation that is often associated with the story.
- 8 July
  - Singer Robbie Williams will appear in a TV advert aimed at raising awareness of testicular cancer, it is reported.
  - BBC One airs a special edition of Question Time from London with Prime Minister Tony Blair as its sole panelist.
- 9 July – Carlton Cinema has signed a deal with MGM.
- 14 July – Debut of BBC One's groundbreaking series The Secret Life of Twins.
- 15 July – US crime drama The Sopranos makes its British television debut on Channel 4.
- 16 July
  - BBC One airs the Two Ronnies Night, an evening of programmes paying tribute to The Two Ronnies, Ronnie Corbett and Ronnie Barker. The evening sees the two comedians reunited on screen for the first time since Christmas Day 1987.
  - Channel 4 announces the axing of the highly acclaimed Trial and Error, a series that investigates miscarriages of justice which it feels is outdated. The final edition looking at the murder of Billie-Jo Jenkins airs on 26 July.
  - Channel 4 launches its Over the Moon season to mark the 30th anniversary of the 1969 Apollo 11 Moon landing. The season includes Real Time Apollo, a five-day broadcast of footage of the Moon mission, airing at roughly the same time events happened in 1969. The programme also features interviews with Buzz Aldrin who took part in the mission.
- 17 July – Debut of Channel 4's Late Night Poker, a series which helps to popularise poker in the 2000s and developed a cult following. The programme includes under table cameras allowing viewers to view players cards that are hidden from the others taking part in the game and is unique in that participants are allowed to smoke on air.
- 19 July – Channel 4 airs an evening of programmes about space ahead of the Moon landing anniversary.
- 22 July – Test cricket coverage debuts on Channel 4 with an updated format and new presenters.
- 23 July
  - The Queen unveils a bronze statue of Eric Morecambe at a ceremony in the Lancashire town of Morecambe, the comedian's home town from which he took his stage name, fifteen years after his death.
  - Channel 4 has commissioned Projector Productions to make a £2 million feature-length adaptation of the children's fairytale Cinderella to be aired over Christmas.
  - Broadcast magazine reports that Teletext Ltd's plans for a digital teletext service have been put back by delays in software development to support the service on the ONdigital platform.
- 24 July – Goodness Gracious Me Night, an evening of programming dedicated to the Asian comedy sketch show Goodness Gracious Me airs on BBC Two.
- 27 July – Cable TV operator NTL buys its largest rival, Cable & Wireless Communications, for £8.2bn.
- 30 July
  - After two decades with the BBC, comedy writer John Sullivan signs a deal to write material for ITV, although he will continue to write his current BBC series Roger Roger and Heartburn Hotel.
  - Three contestants who did not disclose unspent criminal convictions before appearing on ITV's Who Wants to Be a Millionaire? are to have their winnings withdrawn, the show's producers confirm.
  - Channel 4 confirms that Kelly Brook has left The Big Breakfast. The announcement follows recent media speculation about her future with the programme.

=== August ===
- 1 August
  - Dominique Fraser wins the 1999 series of Junior MasterChef.
  - BBC One airs the network television premiere of A Time to Kill.
- 2 August – It is announced that ITV has signed the BBC sports presenter Des Lynam on a four-year contract. He is to become the company's main football presenter.
- 3 August – Liza Tarbuck is chosen to replace Kelly Brook as co-presenter of The Big Breakfast.
- 5 August
  - The publication of the Davies Report which sets out proposals for the future funding of BBC digital services.
  - Former EastEnders co-stars Leslie Grantham and Anita Dobson who played Den and Angie Watts are to team up again to play husband and wife in a Sky Premier adaptation of the Stephen Leather thriller The Stretch which will air the following year.
- 6 August – ITV axes two programmes from its primetime Monday night slot because of falling ratings. Tested to Destruction presented by Carol Vorderman and documentary series The Sexual Century debuted at 9pm and 9:30pm respectively on 26 July, but will be replaced from 9 August and aired elsewhere in the schedule.
- 8 August
  - The Sunday Telegraph reports that former player Gary Lineker has signed a £500,000 five-year contract to become the BBC's new face of football coverage following the departure of Des Lynam. Lineker will remain in this role for more than 20 years.
  - Noel Edmonds announces he is leaving the BBC because its programmes are "too boring". His contract with the Corporation expires in March 2000 and he will present two further shows before his departure, an August Bank Holiday special and Noel's Christmas Presents Unwrapped.
- 9 August – Helen Rollason who in 1990 became the first female presenter on BBC One's Grandstand, dies aged 43, following a two-year battle with cancer.
- 11 August – BBC One and Channel 5 show live coverage of the 1999 solar eclipse. It is not shown live on the ITV network, but in the only region where the eclipse is total, Westcountry Television, just weeks away from losing its on-screen identity, opts out and provides its own coverage.
- 12 August – The BBC programme complaints unit rules that jokes about speech impediments made by comedian Frank Skinner on an edition of his BBC One chat show on 20 May were "insensitive".
- 13 August – Following a successful month-long trial, Cable & Wireless Communications begins offering its customers email and internet services through their television sets.
- 16 August – The US version of ITV's Who Wants to Be a Millionaire? debuts on ABC with Regis Philbin as host. The show's success leads to an increase in interest in UK game shows from American producers.
- 19 August – Claims by The Sun that it has obtained a document detailing EastEnders plotlines for the forthcoming year have been dismissed by the show's producers.
- 22 August – Sky Sports Xtra launches, initially as an interactive service.
- 24 August – BBC One airs Helen Rollason: The Bravest Fight, a 30-minute documentary presented by Peter Sissons in which friends and colleagues pay tribute to her.
- 24 August – The final edition of The Cook Report airs on ITV.
- 27 August – The BBC names Gordon Brewer and Anne Mackenzie as the presenters of Newsnight Scotland, BBC Two's forthcoming Newsnight opt-out for Scottish viewers.
- 31 August – The BBC unveils plans to create separate television, radio and online news services for four new regions in London and the South East.

=== September ===
- 1 September – Launch of Nick Jr., the UK's first television channel dedicated to viewers under the age of seven.
- 2 September
  - Comedian Frank Skinner has been dropped by the BBC after demanding a reported £20 million to stay with the network.
  - ITV's Tonight with Trevor McDonald that launched earlier in the year, is to be cut from an hour to 45 minutes and moved from Thursdays to Wednesdays. ITV says this is to make way for documentaries and drama in the Thursday slot.
- 3 September – An updated version of the classic slapstick game show It's a Knockout makes its Channel 5 debut with Keith Chegwin taking on the presenting role. He is joined by Frank Bruno, Lucy Alexander and Nell McAndrew. Two series are aired over the following 18 months before Channel 5 announce in April 2001 that they have no plans to commission more series.
- 5 September – ITV debuts Springer on Sunday, a one-off David Letterman-style chat show presented by Jerry Springer. Guests include Robbie Coltrane, Glenda Jackson and Tom Jones.
- 6 September
  - The ITV London Weekday franchise Carlton drops the on-air branding of the Central and Westcountry ITV regions, replacing them both with Carlton.
  - CITV show Art Attack is now broadcast twice weekly on Mondays and Wednesdays.
  - Diagnosis Murder, a US comedy/mystery/medical drama series starring Dick Van Dyke, makes its BBC One debut.
  - Debut of ITV's daytime topical discussion show, Loose Women, originally from Norwich. The show will pass its 3000th episode in 2018.
  - The popular children's programme Tweenies makes its debut on BBC2 at 10:30am and again at 3:25pm on BBC1.
- 7 September
  - A man is arrested by police after using a coffee table to smash his way through a plate glass window into the BBC newsroom at White City as journalists were preparing for the 11am bulletin. The intruder also hurled computers and furniture in what is reported to be a protest against the BBC's coverage of a story. The broadcaster launches an inquiry into the incident, after security was tightened at the BBC in the wake of Jill Dando's murder earlier in the year.
  - Channel 5 airs the network television premiere of Roland Emmerich's 1996 science-fiction epic film Independence Day, giving the broadcaster an average audience of 4.98 million (24%) and peaking at 5.5 million (25%) at 10pm, its largest to date.
- 9 September – Debut of the ITV documentary series The Second World War in Colour which marks sixty years since the start of the conflict, showing rare colour footage of World War II which has taken ten years to collate. The series is narrated by the actor John Thaw.
- 11 September – The first of Channel 4's '100 Greatest' programmes air, starting with 100 Greatest TV Moments.
- 13 September – Blackadder Back and Forth, a new installment of the Blackadder comedy series will be part of the exhibition at the Millennium Dome from January 2000. The episode will receive its television debut on Sky in 2001 with the BBC also planning to show it. The episode is part of "Skyscape", the Sky-sponsored entertainment venue at the Dome, something which has led to some confusion over who owns the broadcasting rights to the series that made its debut on the BBC.
- 15 September
  - S4C2 launches. It broadcasts coverage of the National Assembly for Wales and extended coverage of events being shown on S4C.
  - A police officer is charged with driving without due care and attention over the accident that left newsreader Sheena McDonald in hospital earlier in the year.
- 16 September – The first episode of the British-Canadian children's stop-motion animated series Rotten Ralph begins on BBC One with "Happy Birthday Rotten Ralph".
- 19 September – ITV airs Clive James's Postcard from... Havana, a documentary in which Clive James visits Cuba and investigates the impact Communism has on the ordinary lives of Cubans forty years after the Cuban Revolution.
- 20 September
  - Jerry Springer UK debuts on ITV.
  - Children's animation Bob the Builder goes on the air on television in Australia on ABC.
- 21 September – The US animated sitcoms Futurama and Family Guy both debut in the UK on Sky One.
- 23 September – Launch of BBC Text, the service which was renamed BBCi in 2001 and BBC Red Button in 2008, 25 years after the launch of the Ceefax service.
- 24 September – Channel 4's cult sitcom Spaced airs its first episode.
- 25 September – Addressing clergy at a conference in Lancashire, The Right Reverend Allan Chesters, Bishop of Blackburn, criticises soaps such as Coronation Street for their high divorce rates.
- 26 September – Channel 4 broadcasts the network television premiere of Mary Reilly, starring Julia Roberts.
- 27 September
  - The popular children's puppet Sooty returns to television with a brand new series called Sooty Heights, set in a hotel with Richard Cadell and Liana Bridges taking over as presenters as their predecessor Matthew Corbett retired last year.
  - The children's cartoon series Angelmouse, narrated by David Jason, makes its debut on BBC One.
- 28 September – A service of thanksgiving is held for Jill Dando at All Soul's Church in Langham Place, London which is attended by family, friends and colleagues. The service includes a special address from BBC Director-General John Birt.
- 29 September – The European Commission rejects a complaint from BSkyB that the licence fee funding of BBC News 24 is illegal under EU law because it amounts to state funding.
- 30 September
  - The BBC announces details of 2000 to 1, a unique quiz for the millennium that will give one person the chance to win a year off work with prize money equivalent to double their annual salary. The show, presented by Gary Lineker will air through December with the winner being decided on New Year's Eve, although Lineker would be replaced as host by Michael Parkinson prior to filming.
  - The Broadcasting Standards Commission upholds 28 complaints about Channel 4's drama Psychos which aired in May, finding that the series reinforced stereotypes and prejudice towards people with mental health problems.

=== October ===
- 1 October – Sky MovieMax 5 is launched.
- 1 October–6 November – ITV provides coverage of the 1999 Rugby World Cup, hosted for the second time by several countries. Wales are the main host, but many matches are played in England, Scotland, Ireland and France.
- 2 October – The Mirror's Matthew Wright reports that a recent Coronation Street storyline involving the death of the character Judy Mallett, played by Gaynor Faye, has helped to save the life of a woman who sought medical help after watching the episode in which Judy died of a blood clot in her leg following a car crash. The unnamed woman had recently been involved in a motoring accident herself and was experiencing leg pain that she had attributed to bruising. She subsequently attended hospital where doctors diagnosed a blood clot.
- 4 October
  - Launch of Newsnight Scotland, the BBC Scotland opt-out of the main Newsnight programme on BBC Two.
  - BBC Wales unveils a new look for its news programmes with new sets and titles.
  - The BBC have agreed a deal with Welsh broadcaster S4C to screen Welsh language episodes of Teletubbies.
  - HTV Wales launches the soap Nuts and Bolts, a series set in the South Wales Valleys which airs at 7pm. The Independent Television Commission later upholds nine viewer complaints against the programme because some of its content was inappropriate for airing before the watershed. HTV subsequently airs a later episode of the series containing similar content at 10pm.
- 4 October–8 November – The six-part documentary series Walking with Dinosaurs airs on BBC One, using computer-generated imagery and animatronics to show life in the Mesozoic era. Figures issued on 20 October by the Broadcasters Audience Research Board indicate that the first episode was watched by 18.9 million viewers, making it the all-time most watched science programme in the UK and the BBC's 19th most watched programme of all time. 15 million see the episode on 4 October, while a further 3.91 million watch the repeat on 10 October.
- 6 October – ITV airs the network television premiere of the 1996 disaster film Twister, starring Bill Paxton and Helen Hunt.
- 7 October – Gimme Some Truth, a 56-minute documentary featuring unseen footage of John Lennon is set to be aired on British television. Work has recently been completed on the project, but a deal to broadcast it is yet to be agreed. The film is ultimately shown on BBC Two on 13 February 2000.
- 8 October – The BBC prepares itself for a backlash from EastEnders viewers after a murder trial in the soap ends in a wrongful conviction. The character Matthew Rose is found guilty of the manslaughter of Saskia Duncan, but the killing was actually carried out by Steve Owen who walks free. The episode prompts a tabloid newspaper campaign to free Rose who is dubbed "The Walford One". Joe Absolom who plays the character, announces a few days later his intention to leave the show at the end of the year, although he will be seen on screen until February 2000.
- 11 October – Debut of BBC One's The Major Years, a three-part documentary about the premiership of former Prime Minister John Major.
- 12 October – Launch of Open, the UK's first interactive television shopping channel available to Sky Digital subscribers. Viewers can access services from several high street retailers, including WHSmith, Dixons and HSBC.
- 14 October – BBC One airs a special edition of Question Time recorded in Sydney, Australia, ahead of the country's republic referendum.
- 15 October – TNT Classic Movies is replaced with TCM. Also on this day is the launch of the short-lived analogue version of TNT.
- 18 October – Sheena McDonald presents the 1999 Gramophone Awards, her first public appearance since her accident in February.
- 19 October – At a hearing at London's Horseferry Road Magistrates Court, a media studies student who went on the rampage in the BBC newsroom the previous month pleads guilty to affray and common assault. At a subsequent hearing in March 2000, the man who was protesting against TV licence charges and planned to tackle Greg Dyke on the issue, is ordered to be detained indefinitely at a psychiatric hospital because of ongoing mental health problems.
- 21 October – L!VE TV is expected to close after emerges that Mirror Group Newspapers are in negotiations with NTL to sell the channel.
- 24 October – Debut of the BBC Two documentary series, Playing the Race Card which looks at the history of race and immigration in the United Kingdom.
- 25 October
  - Relaunch of BBC News 24 with a new set design.
  - The final special edition of The Cook Report entitled Roger Cook's Greatest Hits airs on ITV.
  - The final episode of BBC One's The Major Years shows footage of an abandoned Conservative Party political broadcast depicting Labour leader Tony Blair as Faust and Peter Mandelson as the Devil. John Major vetoed its use before the 1997 general election believing it would backfire on the Conservatives.
- 27 October – BBC Two airs the 150th edition of TOTP2.
- 29 October
  - ITV chief executive Richard Eyre is named as the new head of Pearson TV, replacing Greg Dyke in the new year.
  - A racism storyline in Brookside reaches a dramatic conclusion when a thug is shown being engulfed in flames as his attempt to petrol bomb the house of a black family goes wrong.
- 30 October – A special live Stars in Their Eyes Champion of Champions is broadcast on ITV, in which the winners of the past ten series all return. Ian Moor, as Chris De Burgh, who won the tenth series in June, wins the show receiving nearly half a million votes from the public.
- 31 October – TeleG is established as the first daily digital Gaelic TV channel in Scotland.

=== November ===
- 1 November
  - ITV has commissioned a further four editions of Springer on Sunday following the success of a pilot edition that aired earlier in the year.
  - Channel 4 launches FilmFour magazine to accompany its subscription film channel FilmFour.
  - FilmFour celebrates its first anniversary with a night of simulcast programmes with Channel 4, including the premiere of Caligula.
- 4 November
  - The BBC establishes the Helen Rollason Award, an award to be given at the BBC Sports Personality of the Year ceremony in recognition of "outstanding achievement in the face of adversity" in honour of the presenter who died in August.
  - Following an in-depth review of BBC One programming led by BBC Director of Television Alan Yentob, the channel says it will give priority to quality programming and reduce its output of docusoaps.
- 5 November – Trinity Mirror announces the closure of L!VE TV which goes off the air on the same day.
- 6 November
  - Investigative reporter and documentary maker Graham Hall who made the 1998 film Inside the ALF for Channel 4's Dispatches, gives an account of how he was recently kidnapped and branded with a hot iron by people claiming to be members of the Animal Liberation Front after meeting someone who told him they had information about an illegal dog fighting ring.
  - The network television premiere of Tony Randel's 1988 British/American horror sequel Hellbound: Hellraiser II on Channel 4, starring Ashley Laurence, Clare Higgins, Kenneth Cranham, Imogen Boorman, Sean Chapman and Doug Bradley.
- 8 November
  - ITV launches a generic look for the second time, the first being in 1989 with most regions adopting idents based around a heart theme. The exceptions are the three Carlton owned regions, the SMG plc owned Scottish and Grampian and UTV.
  - Debut of the six-part Coronation Street spin-off, After Hours which sees Julie Goodyear reprise her role as Bet Lynch.
- 9 November
  - Joanna Lumley and Tom Conti will appear in a series of TV broadcasts to raise funds for a Disasters Emergency Committee appeal to help victims of Cyclone Orissa.
  - Comedian Tommy Tiernan plays a video rental store employee in Channel 4's new sitcom Small Potatoes alongside Sanjeev Bhaskar and Omid Djalili.
- 10 November – MacIntyre Uncovered, a series in which investigative journalist Donal MacIntyre goes undercover to examine issues such as football hooliganism, the fashion photography industry and private healthcare debuts on BBC One. The programme begins on the same day that he announces he is ending his undercover work because the job is becoming increasingly dangerous for him.
- 11 November
  - Popular children's animation Bob the Builder has been sold for broadcasting in South Africa. The series will premiere on SABC2 on Thursdays at 8:40am.
  - Former Blue Peter presenter Tim Vincent is to join the cast of ITV soap Emmerdale as a vet and will be seen on screen from March 2000.
- 12 November
  - Loud Tie Day, an event to raise money for Beating Bowel Cancer, a charity founded by television presenter Lynn Faulds Wood. The event, led by Chris Tarrant aims to raise £1 million for bowel cancer clinics around the UK by encouraging people to wear colourful ties to work.
  - Chris Smith, the Secretary of State for Culture, Media and Sport has instructed the Independent Television Commission to compile a report on the impact of ITV's decision to axe News at Ten, it has emerged.
  - The BBC announces that Fiona Bruce will join Nick Ross as co-presenter of Crimewatch following Jill Dando's murder. She will appear on the show from the following January.
- 13 November
  - The debut of BBC One's National Lottery game show Red Alert sees Alan Dedicoat replaced by Sid Waddell as the "Voice of the Balls", a move that proves to be unpopular with viewers. Dedicoat resumes the role the following week. Waddell will claim he was sacked from the show for being "too Geordie".
  - Tom Baker presents a Doctor Who theme night on BBC Two.
  - The final episode of Catchphrase to be presented by Roy Walker is shown on ITV. It is revamped the following year with new host Nick Weir.
- 14 November – On Remembrance Sunday, BBC One airs the World War I drama All the King's Men about volunteers from George V's Sandringham Estate in the 5th Norfolk Regiment which suffered heavy losses at Gallipoli in 1915. The film stars David Jason as Captain Frank Beck.
- 16 November – BBC Two begins rerunning episodes of Doctor Who, beginning with the first episode of the 1970 adventure Spearhead from Space.
- 17 November
  - To coincide with the release of the new James Bond film The World Is Not Enough, a special edition of BBC One's Tomorrow's World looks at the high tech gadgets that might be used by him.
  - ITV and Sky Sports broadcast live coverage of the second leg of the UEFA Euro 2000 qualifying play-off between England and Scotland at Wembley Stadium. The match finishes in a 1–0 win for Scotland, but England win the tie 2–1 on aggregate and qualify for next summer's tournament.
- 22 November – Channel 5 begins simulcasting Euronews, airing the channel daily between 5am and 6am. The simulcast lasts for only two months and ends on 23 January 2000.
- 23 November
  - BBC One airs an edition of MacIntyre Uncovered, looking at the exploitation of young girls in the fashion industry, something that leads to a row between the BBC and the Elite model agency which claims the programme was "rigged", biased and unfair. Two executives seen making sexist and racist comments in the programme resign amid public anger, but are reinstated by the agency, although they elect to remain on gardening leave while an investigation into the matter takes place.
  - ITV unveils its Christmas schedule which includes an episode of Heartbeat that will see singer Charlotte Church make her acting debut.
- 24 November – BBC One unveils its Winter lineup of programming which will include a remake of the 1960s television series Randall and Hopkirk (Deceased), featuring Vic Reeves and Bob Mortimer in the eponymous roles.
- 25 November – Sarah Lancashire is to briefly reprise her role as Coronation Street's Raquel Watts in early 2000, it is confirmed.
- 26 November – BBC One airs the 1999 Children in Need television fundraiser. By the following day it has raised £11.6m for charity.
- 28 November
  - Debut of Wives and Daughters on BBC One and Oliver Twist on ITV, two costume dramas that compete head-to-head for viewers. Provisional figures released the following day indicate ITV had the larger audience with 8.4 million watching Oliver Twist compared to 7.2 million who saw Wives and Daughters.
  - BBC One airs Ruth Ellis: a Life for a Life, a drama documentary presented by Kirsty Wark that reveals new evidence that could have prevented Ruth Ellis from being the last woman to be hanged in Britain.
- 29 November – From today, children's programming is broadcast all day on BBC Choice, branded CBBC on Choice, every day from 6am until 7pm including programmes rarely seen on the main channel.
- November – Test Card J and Test Card W debut on the BBC, replacing Test Card F which is retired after 32 years.

=== December ===
- 2 December – Comedian Frank Skinner has signed a three-year deal with ITV and will take his chat show to the network.
- 3 December – Channel 5 has signed a deal with Warner Bros. International Television to show their 1999 titles from 2002. Among the films included in the deal are The Matrix, Deep Blue Sea, Message in a Bottle, Eyes Wide Shut, Wild Wild West, South Park: Bigger, Longer & Uncut, Payback and Analyze This.
- 4 December – The millennium quiz 2000 to 1 debuts on BBC One with Michael Parkinson and Katy Hill presenting.
- 6 December – BBC One airs Stephen King: Shining in the Dark, an edition of Omnibus in which the author Stephen King talks about his life and work. The programme is followed by the first part of a TV adaptation of his story The Langoliers, with part two airing on 8 December. The documentary is repeated on BBC Choice on 12 December.
- 7 December
  - A report published by the Broadcasting Standards Commission says that television is failing to reflect the multicultural nature of Britain with few ethnic characters seen on screen in drama and soap and viewers feeling that many that do appear are portrayed as two-dimensional and negatively stereotyped.
  - The final episode of the animated series The Forgotten Toys airs on Children's ITV.
  - Channel 5 broadcasts the TV movie Winter Angel, a revival of the popular 1970s BBC science-fiction series Doomwatch.
- 8 December
  - It is announced that Michael Starke who plays Sinbad in Brookside will leave the soap after more than a decade. He is due to exit the show in September 2000.
  - BBC Two airs a special edition of TOTP2 featuring performances by US country singer Shania Twain.
- 11 December – "Flying Without Wings" by Irish boy band Westlife wins the 1999 Record of the Year.
- 12 December – Recently retired National Hunt trainer Jenny Pitman is presented with the first Helen Rollason Award at the 1999 BBC Sports Personality of the Year ceremony. Boxer Lennox Lewis is named as this year's BBC Sports Personality of the Year while boxer Muhammad Ali is named as BBC Sports Personality of the Century.
- 13 December
  - The Independent Television Commission rules that an episode of Jerry Springer UK featuring rubber fetishists that aired on 27 September was unsuitable for its 8pm timeslot.
  - ITV says it has unearthed colour footage of World War I and plans to make a follow-up documentary to its popular series The Second World War in Colour. The channel has also commissioned a raft of historical documentaries for the 10pm slot.
  - Campaign Live reports that Carlton Communications plc have decided to close their general entertainment channel Carlton Select which airs old terrestrial TV content.
- 16 December – Channel 4 signs a £100 million deal to regain the rights to show US TV series Friends and ER which it has shared with Sky One since 1996. The deal means new episodes of both series will make their British terrestrial debut on Channel 4 from 2001, instead of the current arrangement where Sky is allowed to show them first.
- 19 December – Charlotte Church makes her acting debut in an episode of Heartbeat.
- 21 December – The Britt Allcroft Company purchases a 50% stake in Sooty. The joint-venture business, entitled "Bridgefilms" was formed in an attempt to expand the character to the United States.
- 22 December
  - Former Conservative MP Neil Hamilton hangs up during the middle of a live telephone interview with BBC Breakfast News presenter John Nicholson after he begins questioning him about his financial backers. Hamilton is being interviewed after losing a libel case.
  - Spice Girls singer Emma Bunton launches a government safety advertising campaign warning people of the dangers of drinking and handling fireworks on millennium eve.
  - BBC One airs Tony Grounds's family drama Last Christmas, a television film starring Phillip Dowling, Pauline Quirke and Ray Winstone.
  - BBC One airs Celine Dion: All the Way – a Decade of Song, a programme featuring Celine Dion in concert performing some of the tracks from her recently released compilation album All the Way... A Decade of Song.
  - ITV shows the network television premiere of the 1996 Christmas comedy film Jingle All The Way, starring Arnold Schwarzenegger.
- 24 December – Ian Woodley becomes the first person on British television to win a million pounds on a segment of the Channel 4 show TFI Friday called Someone's Going to be a Millionaire, a reference to ITV's Who Wants to Be a Millionaire? which at the time has not had a million pound winner but eventually will in November the following year.
- 25 December
  - Christmas Day highlights on BBC One include the network television premiere of the 1995 adventure fantasy Jumanji, starring Robin Williams. Hooves of Fire, the first Robbie the Reindeer adventure, also premieres on the channel. Noel Edmunds presents his final live Christmas morning programme for the BBC.
  - ITV beats BBC One in the Christmas Day ratings for the first time since 1984, airing a mixture of soaps, the drama A Touch of Frost and three episodes of Who Wants to Be a Millionaire?. Coronation Street is the most viewed programme with an audience of 14.74 million. However, although ITV has the largest number of viewers for peak viewing, in terms of figures for the overall day, BBC One has the larger percentage of audience share.
  - Channel 4 airs the controversial modern opera Powder Her Face based on the life of Margaret, Duchess of Argyll. The work which includes a scene depicting oral sex is broadcast from 8:40pm in order to time the explicit content to appear after the 9pm watershed.
- 26 December – Boxing Day highlights on BBC One include Mission: Impossible, a 1996 film produced by and starring Tom Cruise.
- 27 December
  - BBC One shows the network television debut of the 1997 musical comedy film Spice World, starring The Spice Girls.
  - ITV has decided to air a documentary about the Krays in which former gangster Freddie Foreman confesses to a murder he committed for the gang in 1966. The Krays – Unfinished Business is scheduled to air on 10 January 2000.
- 29 December – Along with other terrestrial and satellite networks, the BBC simulcasts the "What is it like to lose someone?" ad campaign, featuring the parents of a young woman killed by a drink driver. The advert which explores the couple's grief over the loss of their daughter is part of a new Millennium Drink-Drive campaign.
- 31 December
  - Over 60 countries take part in 2000 Today, a programme seeing in the start of the new millennium. In the UK, the 28-hour marathon show is shown on BBC One and hosted by Michael Parkinson, Gaby Roslin and David Dimbleby.
  - Motivation expert John Mitchell wins the BBC One quiz 2000 to 1 after a tie-breaker in which his opponent answers a question incorrectly. He wins £70,000 and a year off work.
  - On ITV, Trevor McDonald and Dermot Murnaghan present Countdown 2000, a programme showing key events from around the UK and the rest of the world as nations welcome in the new millennium.

=== Undated ===
- Baby Cow Productions founded by Steve Coogan and Henry Normal.

== Debuts ==
=== BBC ===
- 1 January – Bang, Bang, It's Reeves and Mortimer (1999)
- 3 January – Bravo Two Zero (1999)
- 4 January
  - Polka Dot Shorts (1993–2001)
  - The Vanessa Show (1999)
  - Misery Guts (1998–1999)
- 6 January – See It Saw It (1999–2001)
- 7 January – Home Farm Twins (1999–2000)
- 8 January
  - SMart on the Road (1999–2003)
  - Gimme Gimme Gimme (1999–2001)
- 10 January – Shooting the Past (1999)
- 11 January – The League of Gentlemen (1999–2002)
- 12 January – Holby City (1999–2022)
- 15 January – Junk (1999)
- 16 January – Sunburn (1999–2000)
- 24 January – The Scarlet Pimpernel (1999–2000)
- 1 February – Anthony Ant (1999)
- 6 February – Get Your Act Together (1999)
- 18 February –
  - Harbour Lights (1999–2000)
  - 64 Zoo Lane (1999–2013)
- 22 February –
  - Mrs Merton and Malcolm (1999)
- 28 February – All Along the Watchtower (1999)
- 30 March – Supernatural: The Unseen Powers of Animals (1999)
- 7 April – Starhill Ponies (1998–2002)
- 8 April – Miami 7 (1999)
- 12 April
  - Bob the Builder (1999–2011 BBC, 2015–2018 Channel 5)
  - Great Expectations (1999)
- 14 April – The Naked Chef (1999–2001)
- 20 April – A Life of Grime (1999–2004)
- 28 April – h&p@bbc (1999)
- 29 April – The Planets (1999)
- 1 May – The Passion (1999)
- 9 May – Super League Show (1999–2023)
- 25 May – Barking Mad (1999–2001)
- 3 June – It's Only TV...but I Like It (1999–2002)
- 6 June – See How They Run (1999)
- 20 June – Aristocrats (1999)
- 22 June – Hope and Glory (1999–2000)
- 26 June – Star for a Night (1999, 2000–2001)
- 11 July – Badger (1999–2000)
- 18 July – The Mayfair Set (1999)
- 19 July – Life Support (1999)
- 23 July – Patrick Kielty Almost Live (1999–2003)
- 26 July – Zorro (1999–2002)
- 4 August – Jack of Hearts (1999)
- 5 September – Sex, Chips & Rock n' Roll (1999)
- 6 September
  - Diagnosis: Murder (1993–2001)
  - Tweenies (1999–2002)
  - Animorphs (1998–1999)
- 9 September – Let Them Eat Cake (1999)
- 13 September – Eureka Street (1999)
- 14 September – Pure Wickedness (1999)
- 15 September – Insides Out (1999–2000)
- 16 September – Barmy Aunt Boomerang (1999–2000)
- 20 September – People Like Us (1999–2001)
- 27 September – Angelmouse (1999–2000)
- 28 September – Pablo the Little Red Fox (1999–2000)
- 29 September – Belfry Witches (1999–2000)
- 4 October
  - Walking with Dinosaurs (1999)
  - Newsnight Scotland (1999–2014)
- 7 October – DIY SOS (1999–present)
- 8 October – Brotherly Love (1999–2000)
- 17 October – Michael Palin's Hemingway Adventure (1999)
- 31 October
  - The Magician's House (1999–2000)
  - Living Britain (1999)
- 4 November – Extreme Survival (1999–2002)
- 6 November – Friends Like These (1999, 2000–2003)
- 12 November – Hippies (1999)
- 13 November – Red Alert (1999–2000)
- 14 November – All the King's Men (1999)
- 28 November – Wives and Daughters (1999)
- 7 December – Pig Heart Boy (1999)
- 19 December – The Big Knights (1999–2000)
- 24 December – The Greatest Store in the World (1999)
- 25 December – David Copperfield (1999)

=== ITV (Including ITV and ITV2) ===
- 2 January – The Wiggles (1998–2001)
- 4 January
  - Oggy and the Cockroaches (1999–present)
  - Better Homes (1999–2003)
  - The Vice (1999–2003)
  - Mopatop's Shop (1999–2005)
- 7 January – Lavender Castle (1999–2000)
- 10 January – Notes from a Small Island (1999)
- 5 February – Comin' Atcha! (1999–2000)
- 12 February – Days Like These (1999)
- 15 February – Forgotten (1999)
- 17 February – The Planet's Funniest Animals (1999–2008)
- 26 February – Pump It Up (1999–2000)
- 8 March
  - ITN Evening News (1999–Present)
  - The Grimleys (1999–2001)
- 9 March – Wonderful You (1999)
- 18 March
  - Every Woman Knows a Secret (1999)
  - In the Company of Strangers (1999)
- 4 April – Nancherrow (1999)
- 7 April – The Last Train (1999)
- 8 April – Tonight (1999–present)
- 12 April – Maisy (1999–2000)
- 19 April – Butterfly Collectors (1999)
- 26 April – The Blonde Bombshell (1999)
- 4 May – Trust (1999)
- 5 May – Wilmot (1999–2000)
- 6 May
  - Dream Street (1999–2002)
  - Sherlock Holmes in the 22nd Century (1999–2001)
- 12 May – Plastic Man (1999)
- 17 May – An Evil Streak (1999)
- 19 May – Pride of Britain Awards (1999–present)
- 25 May – Bostock's Cup (1999)
- 1 June – Bad Girls (1999–2006)
- 7 June – Always and Everyone (1999–2002)
- 12 June – Animals Do the Funniest Things (1999–2011)
- 20 June – Big Bad World (1999–2001)
- 6 September
  - Loose Women (1999–present)
  - In the Name of Love (1999)
- 9 September
  - The Foxbusters (1999–2000)
  - Daylight Robbery (1999–2000)
- 10 September
  - Jungle Run (1999–2006)
  - Construction Site (1999)
- 23 September – Back to the '50s (1999)
- 27 September
  - Sooty Heights (1999–2000)
  - Hilltop Hospital (1999–2002)
- 28 September – Watership Down (1999–2000)
- 3 October – Nuts and Bolts (1999–2002)
- 28 October – The Waiting Time (1999)
- 8 November
  - My Parents Are Aliens (1999–2006)
  - Lucy Sullivan Is Getting Married (1999–2001)
- 11 November – Extremely Dangerous (1999)
- 14 November – Dr Willoughby (1999)
- 28 November – Oliver Twist (1999)
- 9 December – Four Fathers (1999)
- 20 December – Dark Ages (1999)
- 26 December
  - Faeries (1999)
  - The Turn of the Screw (1999)

=== Channel 4 ===
- 3 February – Sex and the City (1998–2004)
- 5 February – Boyz Unlimited (1999)
- 21 February – Salty's Lighthouse (1997–1998)
- 23 February – Queer as Folk (1999–2000)
- 25 February – Boiling Point (1999)
- 18 March – Escape to River Cottage (1999)
- 19 March – Smack the Pony (1999–2003)
- 29 April – Grand Designs (1999–present)
- 6 May – Psychos (1999)
- 4 June – Bits (1999–2001)
- 6 June – This is Modern Art (1999)
- 20 June – Michael Moore Live (1999)
- 15 July – The Sopranos (1999–2007)
- 17 July – Late Night Poker (1999–2002, 2007–2011)
- 21 July – Love in the 21st Century (1999)
- 31 August – Los Dos Bros (1999–2000)
- 6 September – Show Me the Money (1999–2000)
- 11 September – 100 Greatest (1999–present)
- 17 September – Something for the Weekend (1999–2000)
- 22 September – The Richard Blackwood Show (1999–2001)
- 23 September – The Hip Hop Years (1999)
- 24 September – Spaced (1999–2001)
- 17 October – Bremner, Bird and Fortune (1999–2010)
- 19 October – Shockers (Anthology series) (1999–2001)
- 9 November – Small Potatoes (1999–2001)
- 24 November – Kid in the Corner (1999)
- 28 December – The 1900 House (1999–2000)

=== Channel 5 ===
- 24 January – The Movie Chart Show (1999–2003)
- 20 April – Can We Still Be Friends? (1999)
- 24 April – The Tribe (1999–2003)
- 13 July – House Doctor (1999–2003)
- 2 August – Win Beadle's Money (1999)
- 6 September — Beachcomber Bay (1999–2002)
- 30 October – Harry and Cosh (1999–2003)
- 15 November – The Alchemists (1999)
- 7 December – Winter Angel (1999)

=== Sky One ===
- 18 September – Family Guy (1999–2002; 2005–present) (later on Channel 4, BBC Two and BBC Three; now ITV2)

=== Cartoon Network UK ===
- 4 January – The Powerpuff Girls (1998–2005)
- 15 March – Ed, Edd n Eddy (1999–2009)

== Channels ==
=== New channels ===
Date	Channel
1 June	BBC Knowledge
6 June	Six TV (Oxford & Southampton)
1 July	VH1 Classic; MTV Base; MTV Extra
1 September	Nick Jr. Nick Replay
15 September	S4C2
15 October	TCM
18 October	The Hallmark Channel
31 October	TeleG (Scotland)

=== Defunct channels ===
Date	Channel
30 April	Sky Soap
1 May	Home Video Channel
15 October	TNT Classic Movies
5 November	L!VE TV

== Television shows ==
=== Changes of network affiliation ===
Shows	Moved from	Moved to
It's a Knockout	BBC One	Channel 5
Thomas the Tank Engine & Friends	Cartoon Network	Nick Jr.

=== Returning this year after a break of one year or longer ===
- 3 September – It's a Knockout (1966–1982, 1999–2001)
- Unknown – Fully Booked sequels to be overtaken by FBi (1999–2000)

== Continuing television shows ==
=== 1920s ===
- BBC Wimbledon (1927–1939, 1946–2019, 2021–present)

=== 1930s ===
- Trooping the Colour (1937–1939, 1946–2019, 2023–present)
- The Boat Race (1938–1939, 1946–2019, 2021–present)
- BBC Cricket (1939, 1946–1999, 2020–2024)

=== 1950s ===
- Panorama (1953–present)
- Take Your Pick! (1955–1968, 1992–1998)
- What the Papers Say (1956–2008)
- The Sky at Night (1957–present)
- Blue Peter (1958–present)
- Grandstand (1958–2007)

=== 1960s ===
- Coronation Street (1960–present)
- Songs of Praise (1961–present)
- World in Action (1963–2000)
- Top of the Pops (1964–2006)
- Match of the Day (1964–present)
- Mr. and Mrs. (1965–1999)
- Sportsnight (1965–1997)
- Call My Bluff (1965–2005)
- The Money Programme (1966–2010)

=== 1970s ===
- Rainbow (1972–1992, 1994–1997)
- Emmerdale (1972–present)
- Newsround (1972–present)
- Last of the Summer Wine (1973–2010)
- Wish You Were Here...? (1974–2003)
- Arena (1975–present)
- One Man and His Dog (1976–present)
- Grange Hill (1978–2008)
- Ski Sunday (1978–present)
- Antiques Roadshow (1979–present)
- Question Time (1979–present)

=== 1980s ===
- Play Your Cards Right (1980–1987, 1994–1999, 2002–2003)
- Family Fortunes (1980–2002, 2006–2015, 2020–present)
- Children in Need (1980–present)
- Timewatch (1982–present)
- Brookside (1982–2003)
- Countdown (1982–present)
- Right to Reply (1982–2001)
- Surprise Surprise (1984–2001, 2012–2015)
- The Bill (1984–2010)
- Channel 4 Racing (1984–2016)
- Thomas & Friends (1984–2021)
- EastEnders (1985–present)
- Blind Date (1985–2003, 2017–2019)
- Comic Relief (1985–present)
- The Chart Show (1986–1998, 2008–2009)
- Equinox (1986–2006)
- The Really Wild Show (1986–2006)
- Casualty (1986–present)
- ChuckleVision (1987–2009)
- Wheel of Fortune (1988–2001)
- London's Burning (1988–2002)
- On the Record (1988–2002)
- Fifteen to One (1988–2003, 2013–2019)
- This Morning (1988–present)
- Children's Ward (1989–2000)
- Mike and Angelo (1989–2000)
- Birds of a Feather (1989–1998, 2014–2020)
- Bodger & Badger (1989–1999)

=== 1990s ===
- One Foot in the Grave (1990–2000)
- Rosie and Jim (1990–2000)
- MasterChef (1990–2001, 2005–present)
- How 2 (1990–2006)
- Stars in Their Eyes (1990–2006, 2015)
- 2point4 Children (1991–1999)
- Big Break (1991–2002)
- Noel's House Party (1991–1999)
- Heartbeat (1992–2010)
- The Big Breakfast (1992–2002)
- 999 (1992–2003)
- Mr. Motivator exercise routines (1993–2000)
- Breakfast with Frost (1993–2005)
- Ky's Cartoons (1994–1999)
- Animal Hospital (1994–2004)
- The National Lottery Draws (1994–2017)
- Time Team (1994–2013)
- The Vicar of Dibley (1994–2007)
- Wipeout (1994–2003)
- Frasier (1993–2004)
- Top of the Pops 2 (1994–present)
- Hollyoaks (1995–present)

== Ending this year ==
- BBC Cricket (1939, 1946–1999, 2020–2024)
- Mr. and Mrs. (1964–1999, 2008–2010, 2012–2016)
- ITN Early Evening News (1967–1999)
- Play Your Cards Right (1980–1987, 1994–1999, 2002–2003)
- Strike It Lucky and Strike It Rich (1986–1999)
- The Cook Report (1987–2000)
- Rab C. Nesbitt (1988–1999)
- Red Dwarf (1988–1999, 2009, 2012–present)
- The Larry Sanders Show (1993–1999)
- Bodger & Badger (1989–1999)
- Fun House (1989–1999)
- 2point4 Children (1991–1999)
- Murder Most Horrid (1991–1999)
- Noel's House Party (1991–1999)
- In Bed with Medinner (1992–1999)
- Goodnight Sweetheart (1993–1999)
- The Jack Docherty Show (1997–1999)
- The Wild House (1997–1999)
- The Ambassador (1998–1999)
- Unfinished Business (1998–1999)
- This Morning with Richard Not Judy (1998–1999)
- Rocky and the Dodos (1998–1999)
- Liverpool 1 (1998–1999)
- Grafters (1998–1999)
- Every Woman Knows a Secret (1999)
- Butterfly Collectors (1999)
- The Blonde Bombshell (1999)
- An Evil Streak (1999)
- Aristocrats (1999)
- Win Beadle's Money (1999)
- Let Them Eat Cake (1999)
- The Waiting Time (1999)

== Births ==
- 28 January – HRVY singer and television presenter
- 9 February – Adrianna Bertola actress and singer
- 12 April – Akai Osei, dancer, actor and musician
- 29 April – Callum Scott Howells, actor and television personality
- 7 May – Tommy Fury, reality TV personality and boxer
- 26 May – Molly-Mae Hague, reality TV personality
- 23 June – Noah Marullo, actor
- 14 October – Daniel Roche, actor

== Deaths ==
Date	Name	Age	Cinematic Credibility
1 February	Robin Nedwell	52	actor (Duncan Waring in Doctor in the House)
9 February	Bryan Mosley	67	actor (Alf Roberts in Coronation Street)
24 February	Derek Nimmo	68	character actor
17 March	Rod Hull	63	entertainer
21 March	Ernie Wise	73	surviving half of UK comedy duo, Morecambe and Wise
2 April	Andrew Gardner	66	newsreader
4 April	Bob Peck	53	actor (Ronald Craven in Edge of Darkness)
14 April	Anthony Newley	67	actor, singer and songwriter
26 April	Jill Dando	37	presenter (co-host of Crimewatch)
6 May	Johnny Morris	82	presenter (Animal Magic)
23 June	Buster Merryfield	78	actor (Uncle Albert in Only Fools and Horses)
25 June	Fred Feast	69	actor (Fred Gee in Coronation Street)
4 July	Jack Watson	78	actor
12 July	Bill Owen	85	actor (Compo Simmonite in Last of the Summer Wine)
9 August	Helen Rollason	43	sports journalist and television presenter
10 August	Jennifer Paterson	70	celebrity chef and television presenter, one half of the Two Fat Ladies
1 October	Lena Zavaroni	35	child singer and television presenter
7 October	Deryck Guyler	85	actor (Please Sir!, Sykes)
21 November	Quentin Crisp	90	writer and raconteur
24 November	Hilary Minster	55	actor (General Von Klinkerhoffen in 'Allo 'Allo!)
19 December	Robert Dougall	86	newsreader
19 December	Desmond Llewelyn	85	actor
25 December	Peter Jeffrey	70	actor
Unknown	Jim Wiggins	76–77	actor

== See also ==
- 1999 in British music
- 1999 in British radio
- 1999 in the United Kingdom
- List of British films of 1999
