= Red Alert (game show) =

British game show

- Genre: Game show
- Presented by: Lulu; Terry Alderton
- Country of origin: United Kingdom
- Original language: English
- No. of series: 2
- No. of episodes: 14

Production
- Production location: Bray Studios
- Running time: 55 minutes (1999); 45 minutes (2000)
- Production company: Ginger Productions

Original release
- Network: BBC One
- Release: 13 November 1999 – 8 April 2000

Related
- The National Lottery Draws

Red Alert is a BBC National Lottery game show broadcast on BBC One from 13 November 1999 to 8 April 2000. It was hosted by Lulu and Terry Alderton.

== Transmissions ==
Series	Start date	End date	Episodes
1	13 November 1999	18 December 1999	6
2	19 February 2000	8 April 2000	8
