= Cat senses =

Senses of Felis catus

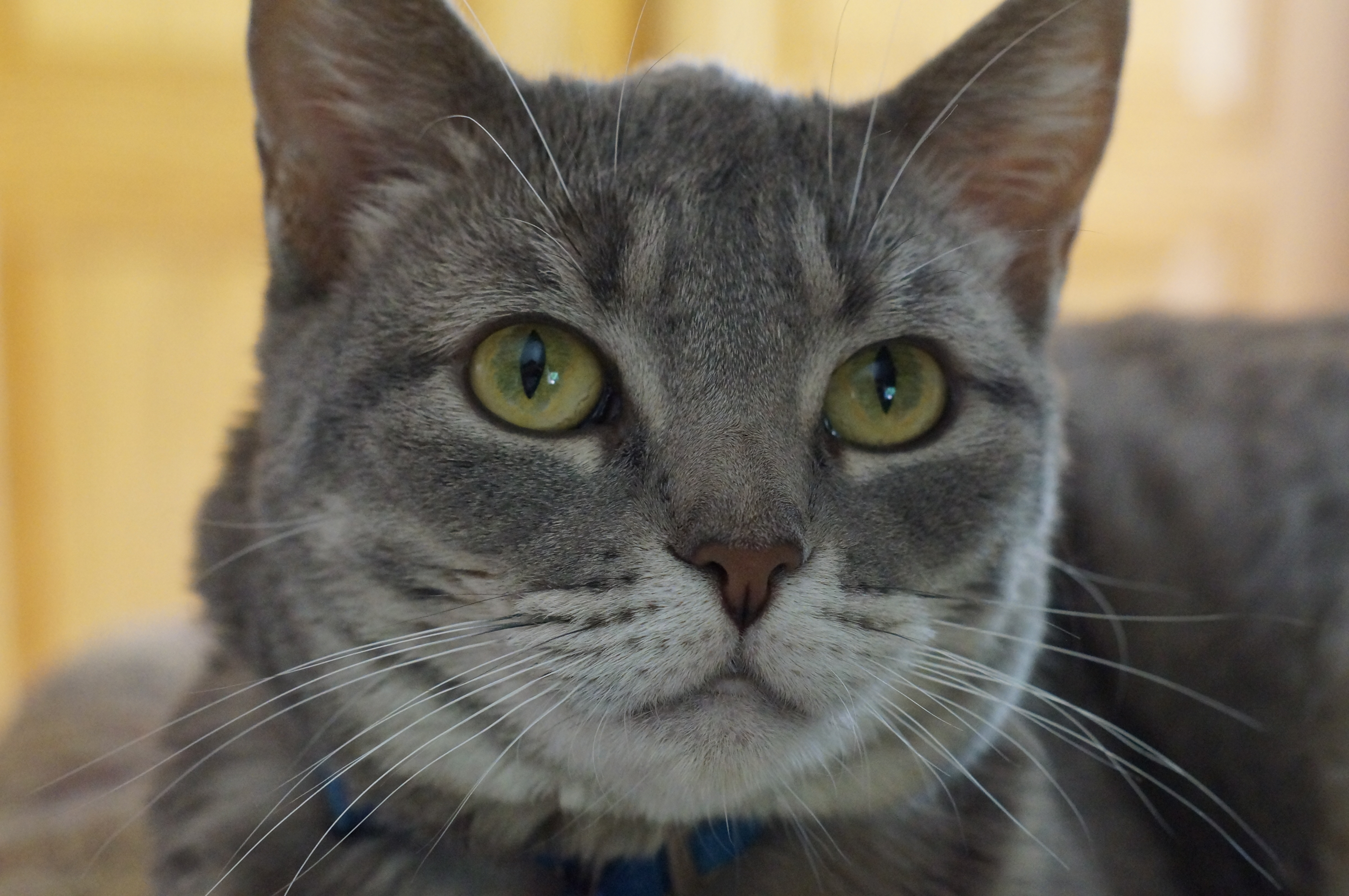
The large ears, eyes, and many vibrissae (whiskers) of the cat adapt it for low-light predation.

Cat senses are adaptations that allow cats to be highly efficient predators. Cats are good at detecting movement in low light, have an acute sense of hearing and smell, and their sense of touch is enhanced by long whiskers that protrude from their heads and bodies. These senses evolved to allow cats to hunt effectively at dawn and dusk.

(video) A cat blinking and looking around

== Sight ==
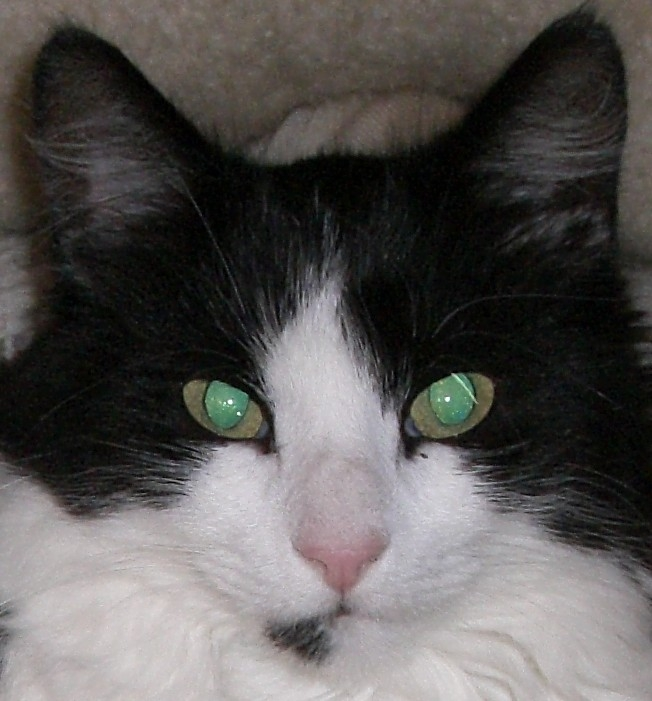
The tapetum lucidum reflecting green in the pupils of a cat

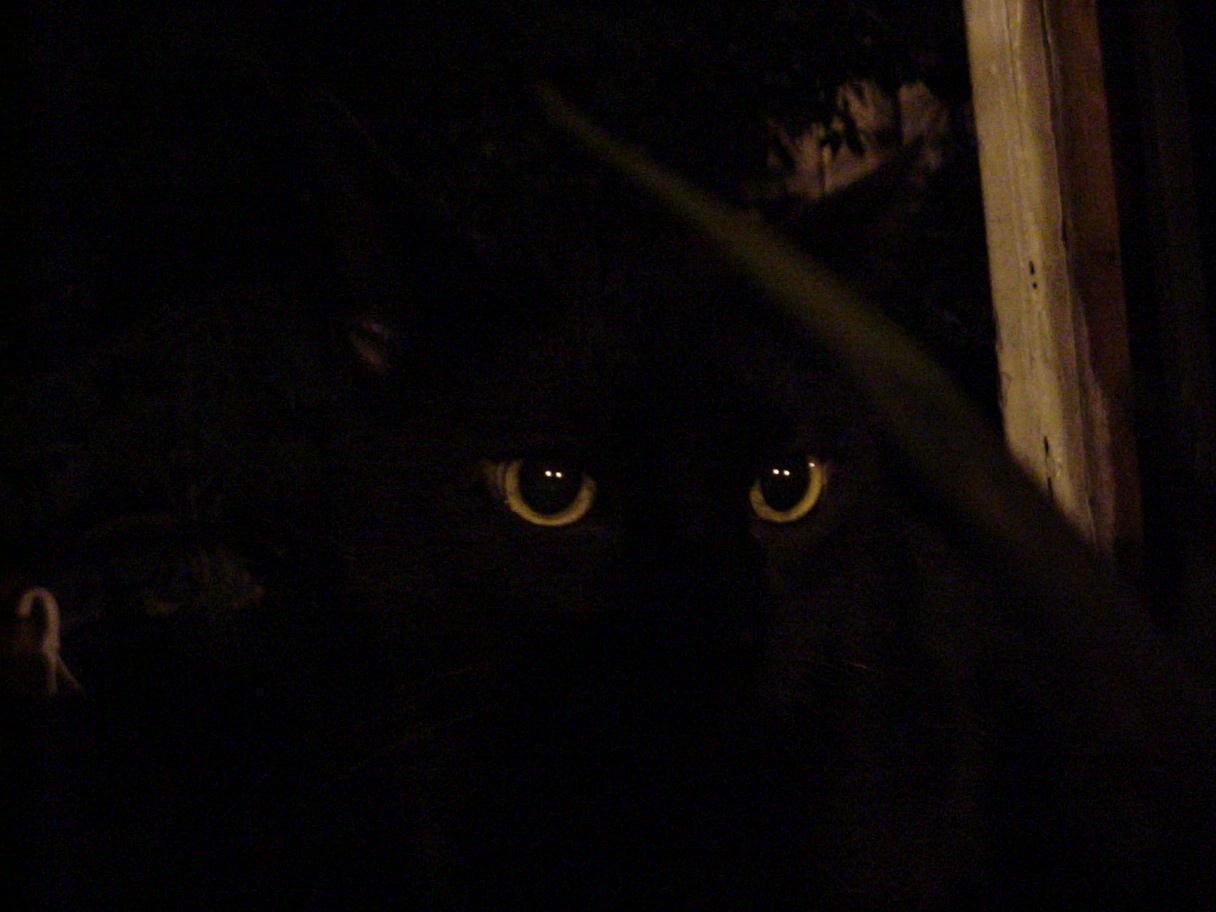
Cat eyes stand out.

Cats have a tapetum lucidum, which is a reflective layer behind the retina that sends light that passes through the retina back into the eye. They also have a high number of rods in their retina that are sensitive to dim light. While these improve the ability to see in darkness and enable cats to see using roughly one-sixth the amount of light that humans need, they appear to reduce net visual acuity, thus detracting when light is abundant. A cat's visual acuity is anywhere from 20/100 to 20/200, which means a cat has to be at 6 metres to see what an average human can see at 20 or 30 metres. Cats seem to be nearsighted, which means they cannot see far objects as well. The ability to see close objects would be well-suited for hunting and capturing prey. In very bright light, the slit-like pupil closes very narrowly over the eye, reducing the amount of light on the sensitive retina, and improving depth of field. Big cats have pupils that contract to a round point. Variation in color of cats' eyes in flash photographs is largely due to the reflection of the flash by the tapetum.

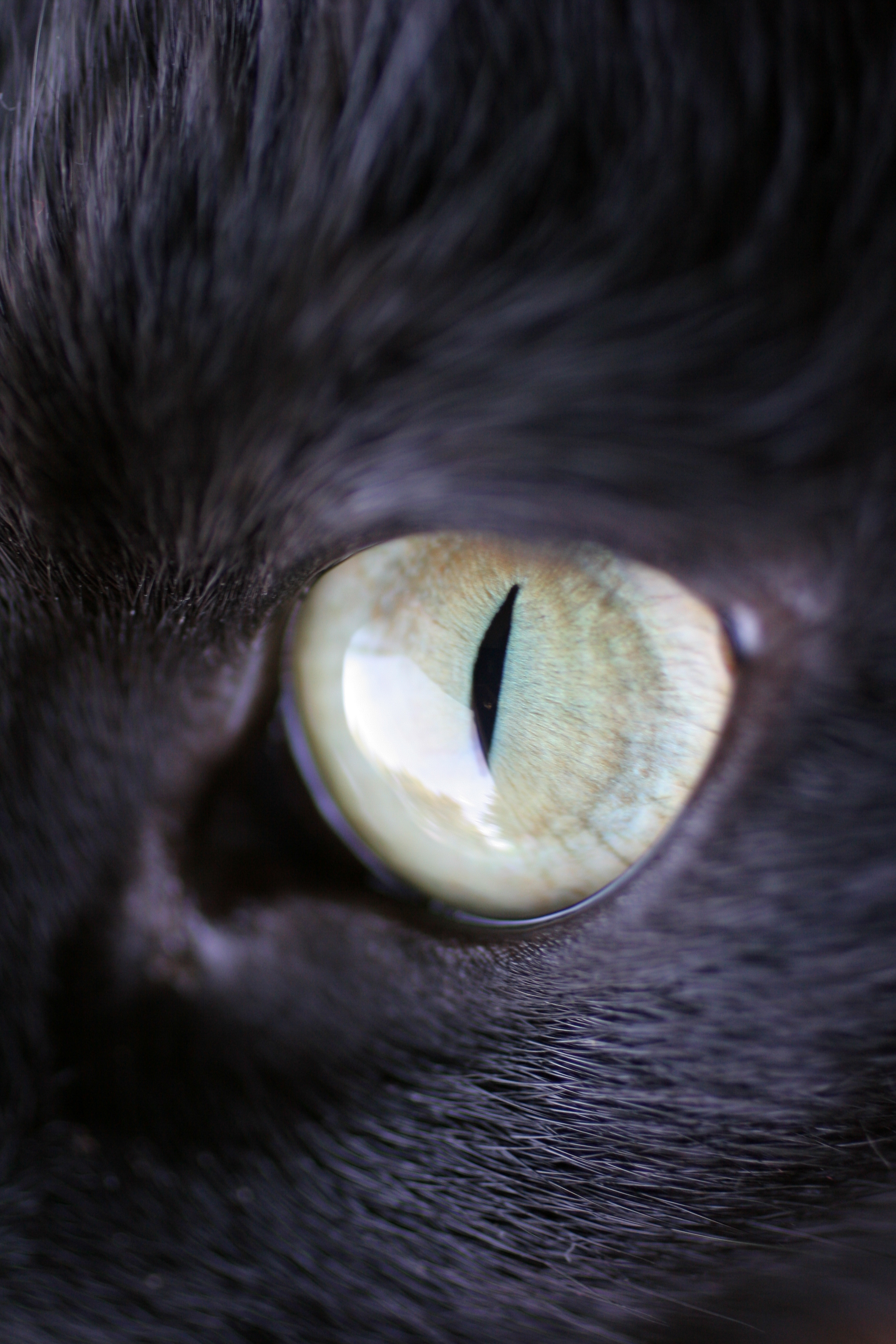
A closeup of a cat's eye

Cats have a visual field of view of 200° compared with 180° in humans, but a binocular field (overlap in the images from each eye) narrower than that of humans. As with most predators, their eyes face forward, affording depth perception at the expense of field of view. Field of view is largely dependent upon the placement of the eyes, but may also be related to the eye's construction. Instead of the fovea, which gives humans sharp central vision, cats have a central band known as the visual streak.

Common for carnivorans (and most mammals), cats are dichromats with two types of cone opsins, LWS (OPN1LW) and SWS1 (OPN1SW), somewhat similar to a human with protanopia. Cats can see some colors and can tell the difference between red, blue and yellow lights, as well as between red and green lights. Cats are able to distinguish between blues and violets better than between colors near the red end of the spectrum, but cats cannot see the same richness of hues and saturation of colors that humans can. A 2014 study found that, along with several other mammals, cats' lenses transmit significant amounts of ultraviolet (UVA 315–400 nm) light, which suggests that they possess sensitivity to this part of the spectrum.

Cats have a third eyelid, the nictitating membrane, which is a thin cover that quickly closes from the side when the cat blinks and is hidden when the cat's eyelid opens. This third eyelid extends upward to protect the eye from trauma, like when moving through tall grass or capturing a prey. This membrane partially closes if the cat is sick, although in a sleepy state this membrane is often visible.

Cats often sleep during the day and some periods of the night so they can hunt at dusk and dawn. Unlike humans, cats do not need to fully blink their eyes on a regular basis to keep their eyes lubricated (with tears).

== Hearing ==
Cats have one of the broadest ranges of hearing among mammals. Humans and cats have a similar range of hearing on the low end of the scale, but cats can hear much higher-pitched sounds, up to 64 kHz, which is 1.6 octaves above the range of a human, and 1 octave above the range of a dog.

When listening for something, a cat's ears will swivel in that direction; a cat's ear flaps (pinnae) can independently point backwards as well as forwards and sideways to pinpoint the source of the sound. Cats can judge within 8 centimetres (3 inches) the location of a sound being made 1 metre (1 yard) away—this can be useful for locating their prey.

It is a common misconception that all white cats with blue eyes are deaf, but white cats with blue eyes do have slightly higher probability of genetic deafness than white cats of other eye colors. White cats having one blue and one other-colored eye are called "odd-eyed" and may be deaf on the same side as the blue eye.

== Smell ==
A domestic cat's sense of smell is 9-16 times as strong as humans'. Cats have a larger olfactory epithelium than humans (about 20 cm^{2}), meaning that cats have a more acute sense of smell. In fact, cats have an estimated 45 to 200 million odor-sensitive cells in their noses, whereas humans only have 10 million odor-sensitive cells (known as "olfactory receptor neurons", or "ORNs"). Cats also have a scent organ in the roof of their mouths called the vomeronasal (or Jacobson's) organ. When a cat wrinkles its muzzle, lowers its chin, and lets its tongue hang a bit, it is opening the passage to the vomeronasal. This is called gaping. It is equivalent to the Flehmen response in other animals, such as dogs, horses and big cats.

== Touch ==
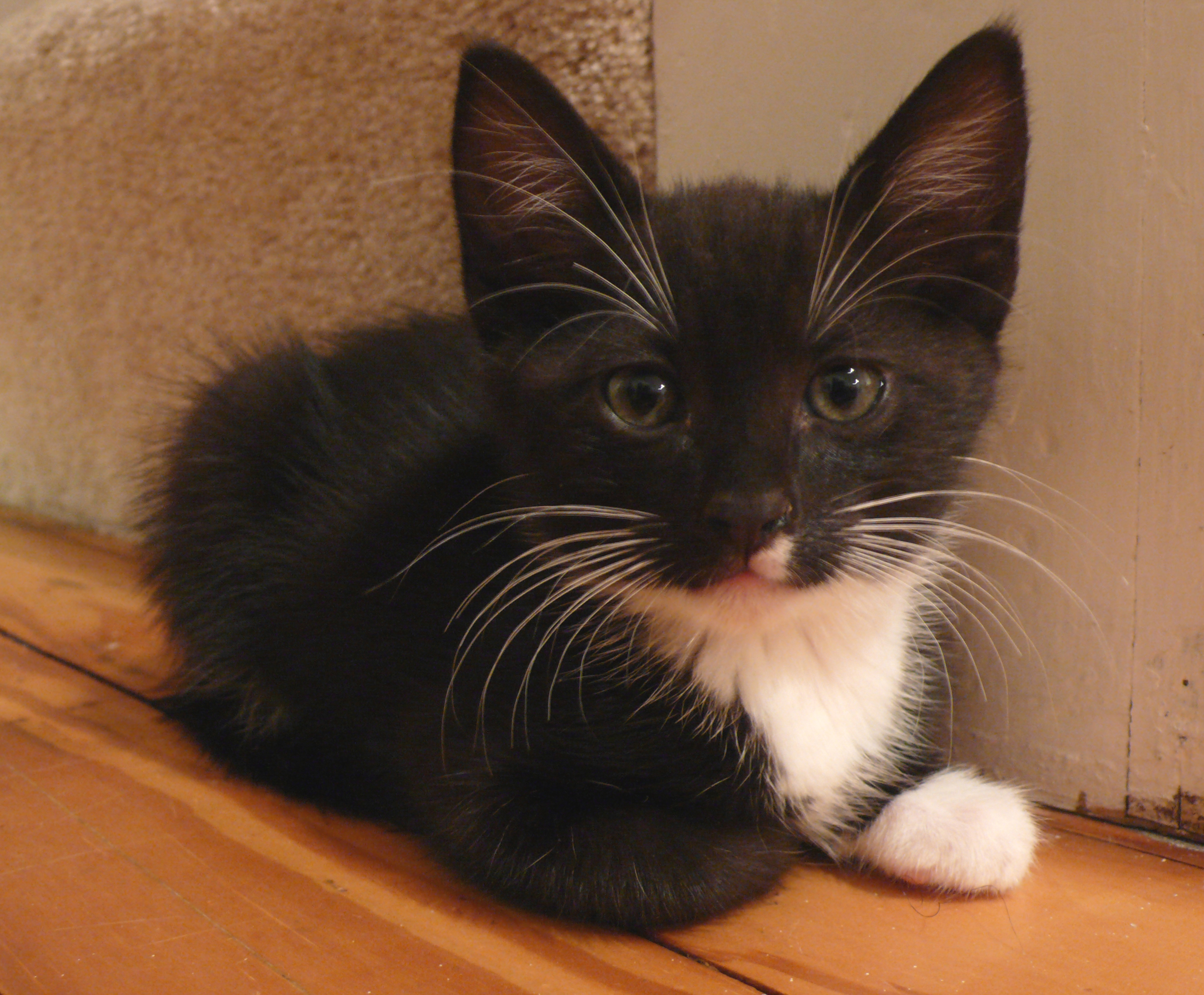
Whiskers on the face of a tuxedo kitten.

A cat has about twenty-four movable vibrissae ("whiskers"), in four sets on each upper lip on either side of its nose (some cats may have more). There are also a few on each cheek, tufts over the eyes, bristles on the chin, the cat's inner "wrists", and at the back of the legs. The Sphynx (a nearly hairless breed) may have full length, short, or no whiskers at all.

The structure of the brain region (barrel cortex) which receives information from the vibrissae is similar to that found in the visual cortex which permits the cat to create a three-dimensional map of its surroundings. This does not mean that sensing with vibrissae is a type of vision. It is still a touch sensation and environmental information is built up incrementally (in small steps).

Vibrissae aid sensation and navigation. The upper two rows of whiskers are able to be moved independently from the lower two rows for greater precision during measurement. A cat's whiskers are more than twice as thick as ordinary cat hairs, and their roots are three times deeper in a cat's tissue than other hairs. They have numerous nerve endings at their base, which give cats extraordinarily detailed information about nearby air movements and objects with which they make physical contact. They enable a cat to know that it is near obstacles without it needing to see them.

Whiskers also aid in hunting. High speed photography reveals that when a cat is unable to see its prey because it is too close to its mouth, its whiskers move so as to form a basket shape around its muzzle in order to precisely detect the prey's location. A cat whose whiskers have been damaged may bite the wrong part of its prey, indicating that they provide cats with detailed information about the shape and activity of its prey.

== Taste ==
The cat family has specialized taste bud receptors. Positively, their taste buds possess the two receptors TAS1R1 and TAS1R3 needed to detect umami. These receptors contain molecular changes that reduce their detection of glutamic acid and aspartic acid, the main amino acids tasted as umami flavor in humans while enhancing their detection of the nucleotide inosine monophosphate and amino acid free l-Histidine. These compounds are particularly enriched in tuna. One of the researchers involved in this research has claimed, "I think umami is as important for cats as sweet is for humans". In their research paper they specifically argue the sensitivity to histidine and inosine explains the palatability of tuna for cats: "the specific combination of the high IMP and free l-Histidine contents of tuna, which produces a strong umami taste synergy that is highly preferred by cats". Cats lack the TAS1R2 protein, one of two required for function of the sweetness sensory receptor. This is due to a deletion in the relevant gene (Tas1r2) which causes a shift in the genetic reading frame, leading to transcription stopping early and no detectable mRNA or protein produced. The other protein, TAS1R3, is present and identical to that of other animals, and the relevant taste buds are still present but inactive. Such a genetic marker found in the entire family and not other animals must be the result of a mutation in an early ancestor; as a deletion mutation it could not revert, and thus would be inherited by all descendants, as the evolutionary tree branched out. Some scientists now believe this is the root of the cat family's extremely specialized evolutionary niche as a hunter and carnivore. Their modified sense of taste would cause them to some degree to ignore plants, a large part of whose taste appeal derives from their high sugar content, in favor of a high-protein carnivorous diet, which would still stimulate their remaining taste receptors.
