= Pedigree Petfoods =

Mars, Incorporated petfood subsidiary

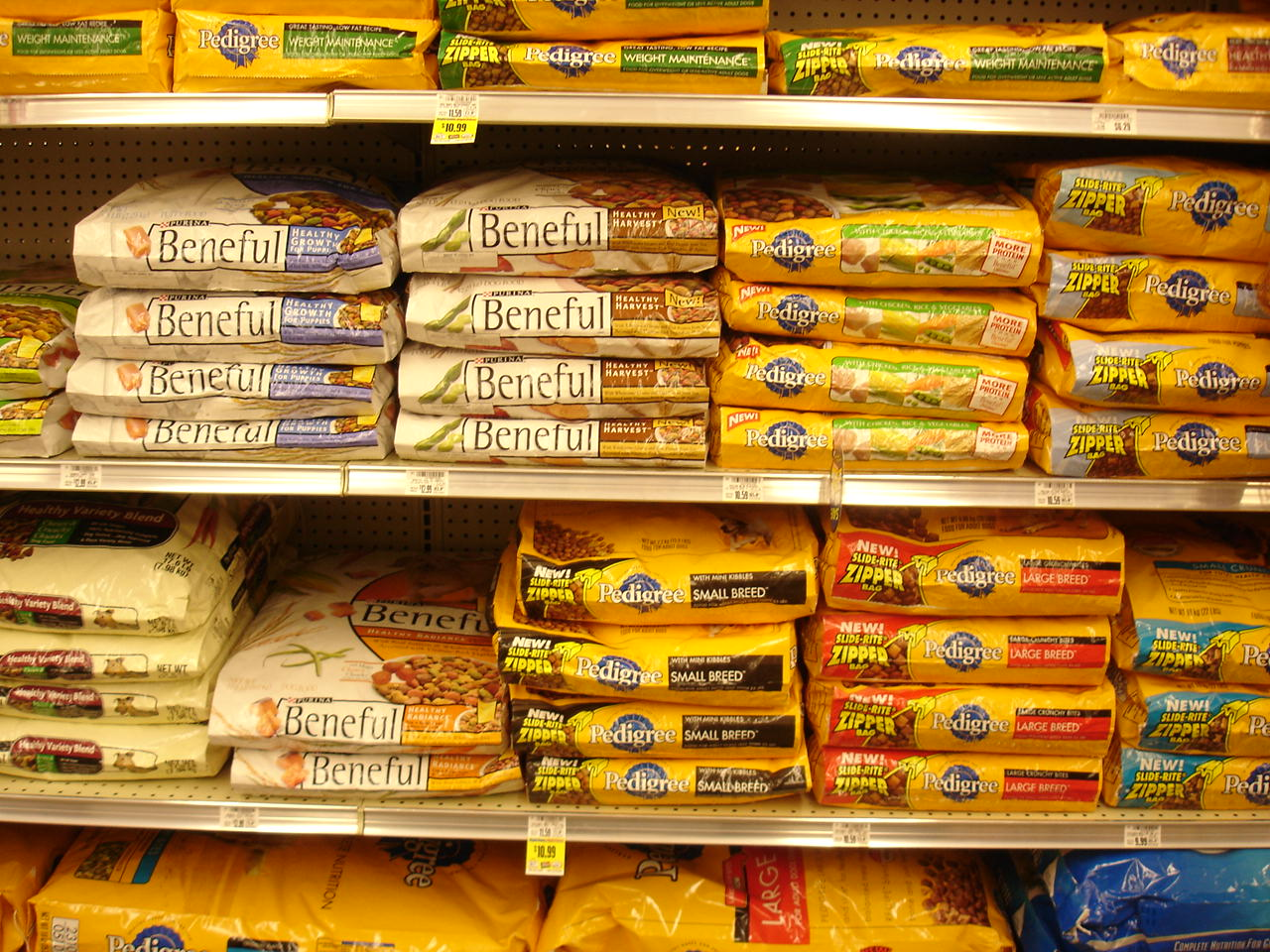
- Bags of Pedigree at a store
- Formerly: Chappie (1934–1988)
- Type: Subsidiary
- Industry: Food
- Founded: 1934; 92 years ago in Leicestershire, U.K.
- Headquarters: McLean, Virginia, U.S.
- Area served: Worldwide
- Products: Dog food
- Brands: Pedigree
- Owner: Mars Inc.
- Number of employees: ~1,200
- Parent: Mars Petcare
- Website: pedigree.com

Pedigree Petfoods is a British company specializing in pet food. It is a subsidiary of Mars Petcare, a division of the American group Mars, Inc.. The company has factories in England at Melton Mowbray and Birstall, Leeds; and offices at McLean, Virginia.

== History ==
In 1934, Mars Limited, a division of the large American confectionery company, that had been based in Slough since 1932, acquired Chappel Brothers in Manchester. This company took low-quality meat and canned it as dog food, branded as "Chappie".

New dog food brands Pal and Lassie were introduced during the 1950s.

=== Mars Inc. ===
In 1968, Mars took over Kal Kan Foods of Los Angeles.

In 1988, Kal Kan Foods changed the name of its dog food to Pedigree, the name Mars used to sell dog food outside the United States. The brand Chappie is still used in the United Kingdom. The next year, Mars applied their worldwide branding of Whiskas to their cat food branding.

In 1998, Kal Kan was the top-selling dog food brand but was going downhill. In the United States, its Pedigree Select brand became Cesar, used in Europe and Asia.

== The Pedigree Foundation ==
In the United States, The Pedigree Foundation is a philanthropic organization dedicated to helping shelter dogs find permanent homes. The foundation, created in 2008, provides grants to 501(c)(3) dog shelters and breed rescue organizations, and help dog lovers adopt, volunteer, and make donations. According to the foundation's FAQ site, it has raised more than $4 million to date. In 2008, it distributed more than $1.1 million in grant money to more than 500 shelters and breed rescues. Use of awarded grant money by qualified recipients is virtually unrestricted, but is most often used for shelter improvements or veterinary care.

== See also ==
- Whiskas
- Mars, Incorporated
