= Ian Woodley =

English game show contestant and poker player (born 1960)

- Nickname: None
- Born: 1960 (age 65–66)

World Series of Poker
- Bracelet: None
- Money finishes: 3
- Highest WSOP Main Event finish: None

European Poker Tour
- Title: None
- Final table: None
- Money finishes: 2

Ian Woodley (born 1960) is an English game show winner and professional poker player, based in Lee, South London.

== TFI Friday ==
On 24 December 1999, Woodley won £1,000,000 on Chris Evans' television series TFI Friday, during the Someone's Going to be a Millionaire section of the show. This section was designed to guarantee a winner of £1,000,000 on British television for the first time (Who Wants to Be a Millionaire? did not have a £1,000,000 winner until Judith Keppel won on 20 November 2000).

Woodley won the prize by successfully answering the question "In the film American Pie, what was the pie made from – cherries or apples?" After winning the money, Evans asked Woodley if the money would change his life; Woodley responded that it would not, and he intended to remain unemployed. In fact he was employed by J.Sainsbury Charlton depot as a warehouse operative.

== Poker ==
Since winning the prize on TFI Friday, Woodley has become a regular on the poker tournament circuit. In 2005, he won the £200 pot limit Texas hold 'em event at the European Poker Classics, and followed the performance with a 3rd place finish in the £1,500 no limit hold 'em main event, winning over £115,000 across the events. Woodley also won the final broadcast of the PartyPoker.com Poker Den (week 12), earning a further £50,000. This combined with his million pound win on TFI Friday makes him the biggest known gameshow winner in British television history. In 2006, Woodley made the televised final table of the Irish Open event, finishing 2nd for €180,000, and cashed for the first time in the World Series of Poker (WSOP).

As of 2008, his total live tournament winnings exceed $850,000.

== Personal life ==
Woodley is divorced, has two sons Greg, Michael and a daughter Laura, and supports Charlton Athletic F.C.
