= Waltham Petcare Science Institute =

English science organization

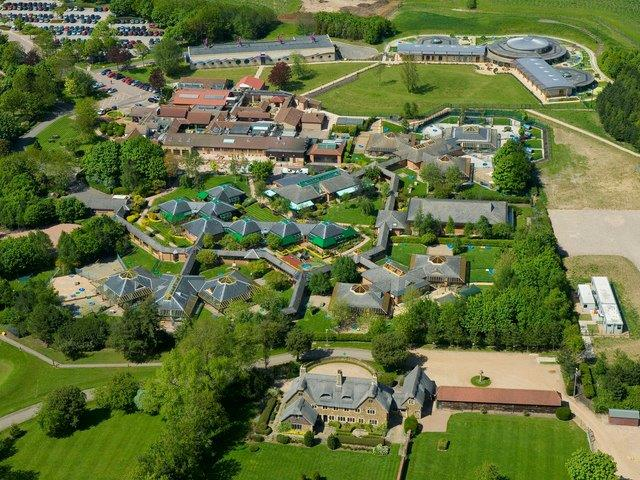
- Abbreviation: Waltham
- Formation: 1973
- Type: Research institute
- Legal status: Private company
- Purpose: Scientific research into pet health and nutrition
- Location: Freeby Lane, Waltham on the Wolds, Leicestershire, LE14 4RT
- Region served: Worldwide
- Members: Pet nutritionists, veterinarians, data scientists
- Parent organization: Mars Petcare
- Affiliations: International Association of Human-Animal Interaction Organizations, International Veterinary Information Service
- Website: Waltham

The Waltham Petcare Science Institute is the science hub for Mars Petcare, owned by Mars, Incorporated located at Waltham on the Wolds, Leicestershire, United Kingdom. Waltham conducts scientific research into pet care and animal nutrition (for dogs, cats, fish and horses).

== History ==
The Melton factory opened in 1951. The pet food subsidiary of Mars, Incorporated (Mars Petcare) began research into pet nutrition in the early 1950s, formally founding a Nutrition Research Unit in 1965. Originally the institute was housed at a nearby location but was moved to an old stud farm at Waltham-on-the-Wolds in 1973.

It opened in March 1973, known as the Animal Studies Department. The site opened a dog kennel block in 1975. The site was damaged by high winds in the Gale of January 1976 in early January 1976. By 1977 it was known as their Animal Studies Centre.

In February 1984 Pedigree Chum received a Royal Warrant, for feeding the Queen's corgis. A puppy unit was built in 1984. An Aqualab had opened by the 1990s, for pet fish. A new electrical substation was built in 1996.In 1996 the Advertising Standards Authority told Petfoods to change one of their television adverts, as it claimed that their products could help animals to see in the dark.

Since 2001, a non-charitable organisation called the Waltham Foundation has funded a number of humane scientific research projects dedicated to furthering the health and nutrition of companion animals.

By 2002 it was attracting the interest of PETA, an animal rights organisation for research on anti-oxidants conducted alongside the University of Florida College of Veterinary Medicine.

An August 2019 documentary on Channel 4 made by Whitworth Media featured the site.

=== National offices ===
In 1979 many office functions were moved away from the Melton site, to Waltham, to allow more manufacturing at the Melton site. A new national office was planned to be built at the Waltham site. Melton Borough Council allowed this planning in early November 1978. It had been seen as a controversial planning application, but it had no difficulty being passed by the Melton council planning department. In 1979 it was seen as controversial, and some councillors would resign if the planning application was passed. Waltham local councillor Harry Hunt resigned in protest when the council allowed the national offices to be built at Waltham; he was quite angry.

Local councillors were suspicious that the Melton Borough Council deeply wanted the continued financial patronage of the Mars company in the local area, possibly at any cost or extremity. The Mars company were known to have a long history of financial generosity to many local organisations, such as youth groups. The planning decision was referred to the Local Ombudsman.

The new £2.4m national offices were built by R M Douglas, of Birmingham, from late 1979. The national offices would open in 1981. It was completed in December 1980, with a large car park and cafeteria. It opened on Monday 5 January 1981. At the time, the company had 60% of the UK petfood production. The new site also housed the Pedigree Petfoods Education Centre.

== Visits ==
- Friday 7 May 1993 at 11am, new buildings were officially opened by Anne, Princess Royal; she visited a hosiery factory in Hinckley in the afternoon. There had been a five-year series of buildings built.
- Friday 15 July 1994, the Chancellor of the Exchequer, Kenneth Clarke, visited for three hours, including the national offices
- Tuesday 29 September 2015, Prince Andrew, Duke of York visited; he later visited Charnwood Forest Golf Club in Woodhouse Eaves, and the National Quantum Technology Hub at the University of Birmingham

== Research ==
Animals are regularly weighed, as well as their faeces. In 1997 there were 450 cats, 250 dogs, and 300 birds in 100 acres, in 20 buildings. The cats lived in colonies of 20-25.

- In 2001 it developed a range of foods to reduce the risk of animals suffering from cancer and heart disease.
- In 2002 it developed a range of foods for animals with arthritis, made from the green-lipped mussel.
- In July 2005, in collaboration with the Monell Chemical Senses Center in Pennsylvania, Waltham discovered that cats cannot taste sweet food because they have a faulty gene. Lions, tigers, leopards and pumas (family Felidae) have the same defective gene.
- In April 2007, in collaboration with the National Human Genome Research Institute of Bethesda, Maryland, Waltham found that the genetic variation of dogs' size is due to mutations in the IGF-1 gene. This was discovered through research on the Portuguese Water Dog. This research was preparatory work for similar studies on the human genome.
- In 2016 found that cats are drawn to a diet of 70% protein and 30% fat

== Publications ==
- Waltham originally published the magazine Waltham Focus four times a year. This has since been renamed as Veterinary Focus and is distributed in more than fifty countries and is published in several languages.
- The Waltham Book of Companion Animal Nutrition, 15 July 1993, Butterworth–Heinemann, 136pp, ISBN 0-08-040843-5
- The Waltham Book of Human Animal Interaction, 30 September 1995,Butterworth–Heinemann, 148pp, ISBN 0-08-042284-5 HC 0-08-042285-3 PB
- Waltham pocket book of essential nutrition for cats and dogs. 2nd edition, 2012
- Waltham pocket book of human animal interactions, 2012
- Waltham pocket book of puppy nutrition and care, 2012
- Waltham pocket book of healthy weight maintenance for cats and dogs, 2010

== Structure ==
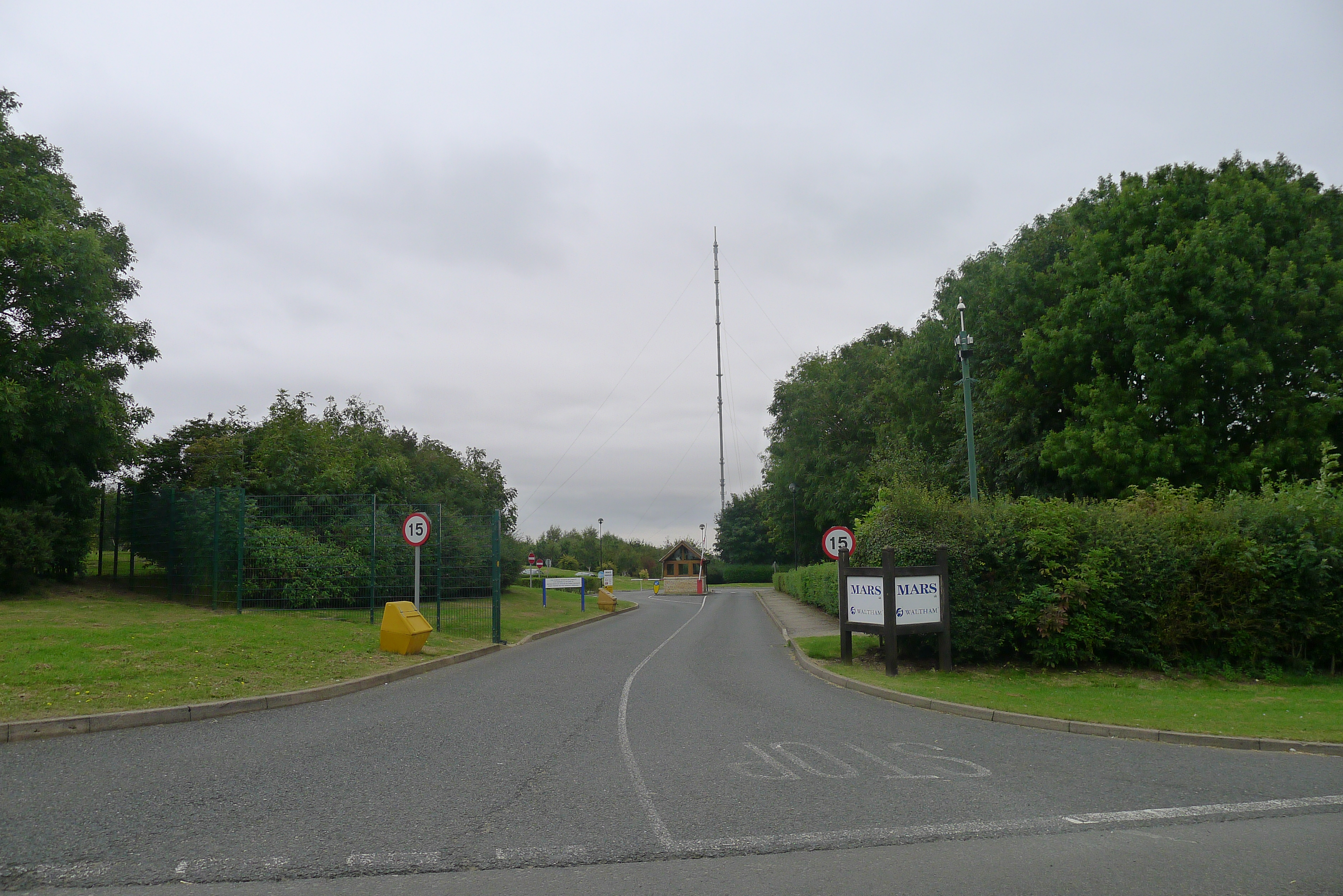
The entrance in August 2017, with Waltham transmitting station in the distance

Mars Waltham houses and cares for around 200 dogs and 350 cats. The companion animals involved with the organisation are adopted after a period of time. The UK headquarters of Mars was built next to the Centre in 1981.

There is another research site at Verden an der Aller in north Germany, at Mars Petcare's largest factory in Europe.
