= Whiskas =

Brand of cat food

- Type: Subsidiary
- Industry: Food
- Founded: 1936; 90 years ago in Los Angeles, California
- Fate: Acquired by Mars Inc. in 1968
- Headquarters: McLean, Virginia, U.S.
- Area served: Worldwide
- Products: Cat food
- Owner: Mars Inc. (1968–present)
- Parent: Petfoods Ltd (1968–present)
- Website: whiskas.me Japanese kalkan page

Whiskas (also known as Kal Kan in Japan and other regions) is a brand of cat food sold internationally. It is owned by the American company Mars Inc. It is available either as small meaty pieces in sauce, gravy or jelly packaged in tins, foil trays or pouches, as well as in the form of small biscuits sold in cartons or pouches and milk sold in small bottles. Its packaging has a recognizable purple colour, and its logo consists of a stylized silhouette of a cat's head.

== History ==
Whiskas, originally known as "Kal Kan", started manufacturing pet foods in 1936 from its headquarters near Los Angeles, California. It eventually grew its operations across the United States. In 1958, it entered the UK market under the "Whiskas" brand, which was later expanded throughout Europe.

The company was bought by Mars Inc. in 1968, and became a subsidiary of Petfoods Ltd (later re‐named Pedigree Petfoods).

In 1989, Kal Kan changed its name in the U.S. to Whiskas, to bring it under a single international brand (in line with their European operations) and to help unify advertising campaigns globally, along with removing any confusion between its cat and dog food brands (the dog food line had become Pedigree the year before). Prior to 1989, Kal Kan's dry cat food had been sold under the Crave brand. Although Kal Kan had more brand equity in the United States, "Whiskas" was also found to be perceived by consumers a more likeable and "feline-sounding" name.

In some markets, like Japan, the KalKan name is still used for MARS´s cat food line.

In the United States, Whiskas is made in McLean, Virginia, by Pedigree Petfoods.

== Marketing and slogan ==
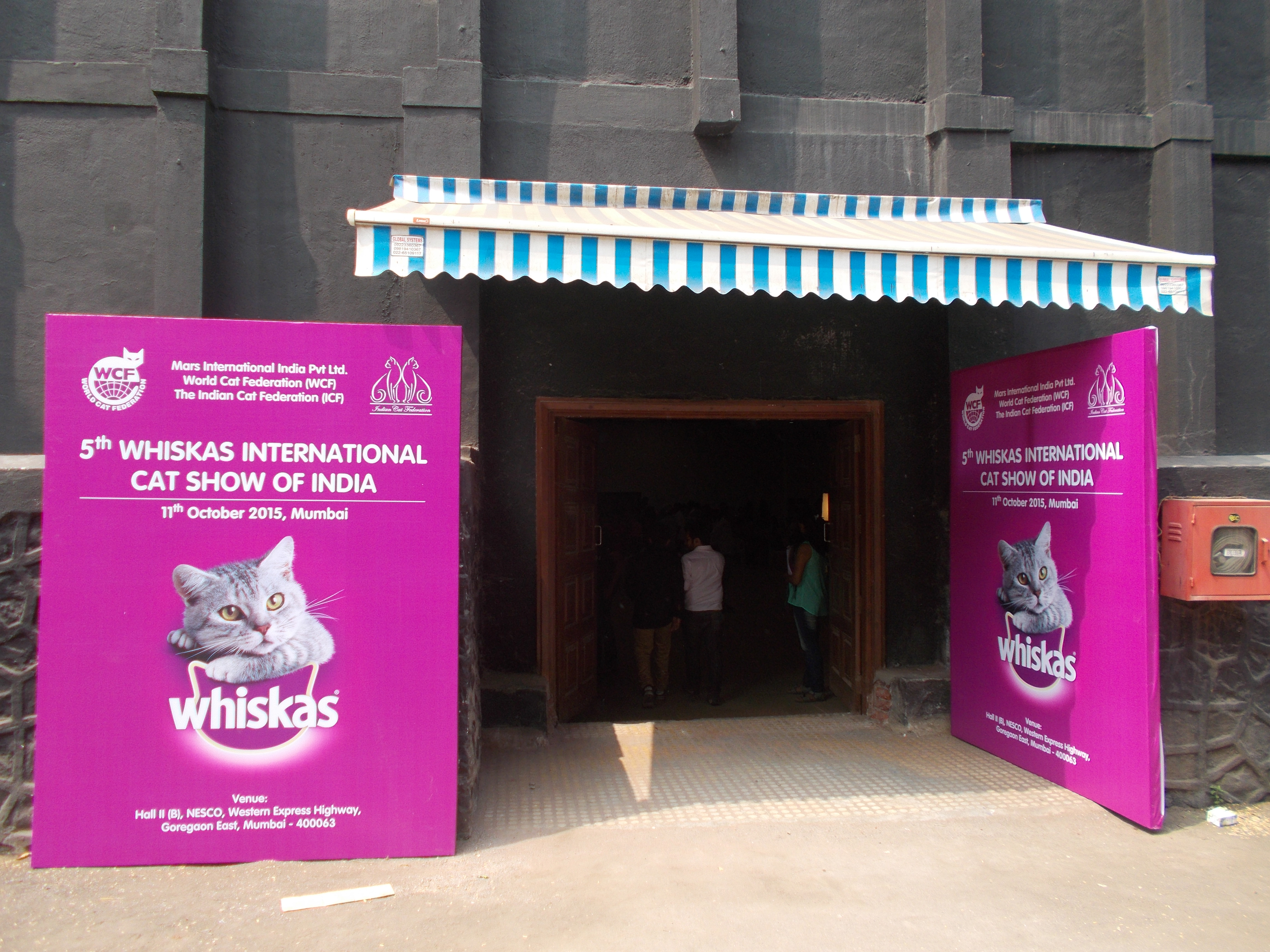
Whiskas sponsoring the 2015 Mumbai Cat Show

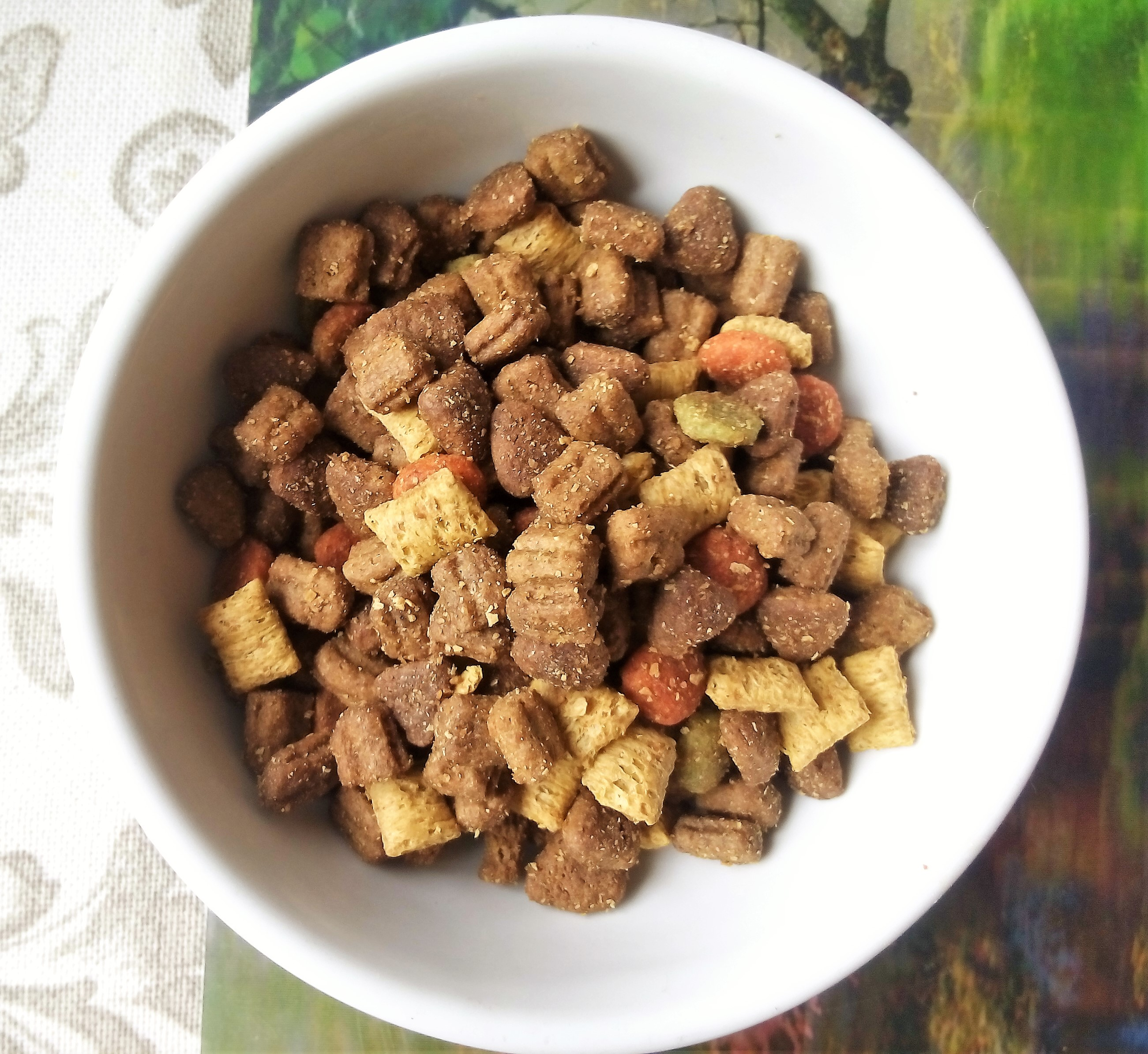
Dish of Whiskas with chicken

In the United Kingdom, a popular misquoting of the well-known advertising slogan for Whiskas was "8 out of 10 cats prefer Whiskas", which, in adverts, was actually "8 out of 10 owners said their cat preferred it". After a complaint to the Advertising Standards Authority, this was changed to: "In tests, 8 out of 10 owners who expressed a preference, said their cat preferred it". The British panel show 8 Out of 10 Cats takes its name from the slogan. The slogan has been much imitated – in the 1980s, Red Stripe Lager was advertised with the slogan "9 out of 10 cats prefer it", a play on "cat" meaning "a trendy person". Similarly, a 1987 TV advertisement for Pretty Polly in which a nylon stocking was used to replace the fan belt in a Jaguar car used the slogan "So smooth, 9 out of 10 cats prefer them"; "cat" this time is a reference to the make of car featured.

In 1999, Australian rules footballer Garry Hocking changed his name by deed poll to "Whiskas" as part of the Geelong Football Club promotion with the company. It was the first such publicity stunt of its kind.

On June 3, 1999, Whiskas singles aired "the very first commercial for cats" on American television, which was originally broadcast in Britain in January. The VHS release featured a small segment on how the advert worked and showed several cats' "reactions". The advert was a collection of clips with contrasting colours, fish and video captured from underwater. The end of the video (before fading out and then running again) claimed that "In our tests, 8 out of 10 preferred it".

In Hungary, the Whiskas advertising slogan is "A macskák Whiskast vennének", which means "Cats would buy Whiskas (if they could)". Slogans with the same meaning are used in Serbia, Germany, Austria, Finland, Estonia, France, Slovakia, the Czech Republic, Russia, Romania, Poland, the Netherlands, and Slovenia. In Denmark, there once was an advertising slogan "Katte ville vælge Whiskas", which means "Cats would choose Whiskas." In Sweden, a similar slogan is used: "Whiskas – Om katten själv får välja", which means "Whiskas – If the cat itself gets to choose". In Russia, the slogan was "Ваша киска купила бы Вискас", which means "Your kitty would buy Whiskas", where the phrase is rhymed, since one of the words for "kitty" and "Whiskas" rhyme in Russian. In Italian-speaking countries, the slogan i gatti comprerebbero Whiskas – "cats would buy Whiskas" has long been in use.

In Autumn of 2009, Whiskas handed out feeding dishes to the earliest 1,000 registrations to their menu planner.
